= Yacine Elghorri =

French illustrator

ELGO
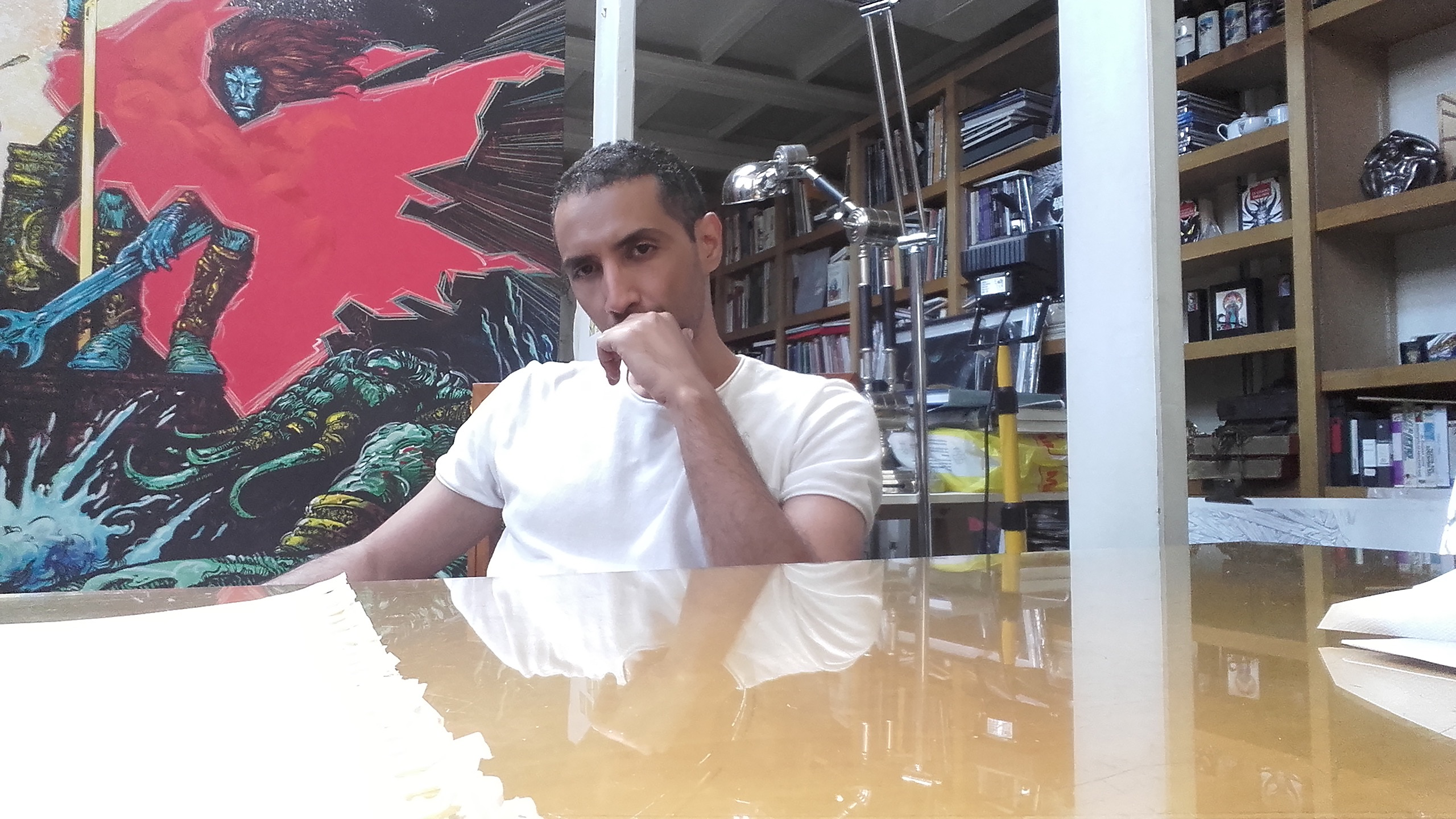
- Elgo
- Born: Paris, France
- Areas: Cartoonist, Writer, Penciller, Inker
- Pseudonym: ELGO
- Notable works: Futurama Titan A.E

Yacine Elghorri, also referred to as Elgo, is a French illustrator, storyboard artist, conceptual designer and comic book artist. He worked in the United States on films and cartoons such as Matt Groening's Futurama, Titan AE, Evolution directed by Ivan Reitman, Fantastic Four: World's Greatest Heroes, Time Jam: Valerian & Laureline and Thru the Moebius Strip. He has also contributed to the science fiction comics magazine Heavy Metal.

== Career ==
Elgo was born in Paris, France. After graduating from college, he went to film school Gobelins to study animation. The school has an international reputation, producing numerous talented individuals and teams hired by the world's leading animation studios. Focusing on conceptual art and design, Elgo worked on a few television series (Flash Gordon, The New Adventures of Lucky Luke, W.I.T.C.H., Xyber 9: New Dawn), and drew comics for various French magazines.

In 1996 he moved to the United States to work in the film industry. He settled in Los Angeles where he worked for Rich Animation Studios, Saban Entertainment, Mainframe Studios, Sony Pictures Television, Tippett Studio and 20th Century Fox. Elgo pursued his career as a comic book artist drawing short stories for Heavy Metal, IDW Publishing and Marvel Comics. He has also worked as a concept designer and storyboard artist on several films, television series and commercials such as: Spiders II: Breeding Ground, Replicant, The Order, The Monk, a canceled project directed by Ringo Lam ( starring Jean-Claude Van Damme), The Swan Princess III: The Mystery of the Enchanted Treasure, Titan A.E, Evolution (with Oscar and Emmy Award-winning visual effects creator Phil Tippett), Jackie Chan Adventures ( Early concept design, uncredited ), Time Jam: Valerian & Laureline, Futurama ( season 1) and 7 Up.

He has also worked with writer Jean Dufaux on a series of three graphic novels called Medina published in France, Belgium and Spain by Le Lombard publishing. The artist and co-creator of the magazine Métal hurlant, Philippe Druillet, wrote a preface for Elgo. His mini series Factory has been translated in English and published by Titan Comics. Elgo has specifically asked for a cover by Simon Bisley.

Elgo also collaborated with comic book writer and director Alejandro Jodorowsky on an aborted project based on the character Gorgo-the-dirty from the series The Incal, originally illustrated by Jean Giraud. The project was picked up again in 2014 in the third volume of the series After the Incal, illustrated by José Ladrönn and published by Les Humanoïdes Associés.

In 2017, Elgo was one of the 80 artists exhibited in Los Angeles by the Copro gallery and Heavy Metal Magazine to celebrate the 40th anniversary of the cult science-fiction magazine with the Heavy Metal 40th Anniversary Art Show.

His works are influenced by revered artists such as Enki Bilal and Katsuhiro Otomo 大友 克洋 ( whom he met during the production of Steamboy ). Additionally, he has collaborated with legendary artist Mœbius on the animated science fiction film Thru the Moebius Strip.

In 2022, journalist-writer Jean-Pierre Dionnet suggests to Elgo to create a short story for the reboot of the magazine Métal Hurlant.

Elgo currently lives in Paris, France, where he gives lectures at art schools and works on his paintings.

== Bibliography ==
=== Comics ===
- 'HEAVY METAL', 1999
- 'GUNMAN', Carabas editions, 2005
- 'BESTIAL', Children's book, Carabas, 2006
- 'FACTORY', 3-issue series, Carabas, 2006–2009
- 'MEDINA', 3-issue series, Lombard, 2012–2015
- Incredible Hulks Vol 1 618, Marvel Comics
- TMNT UNIVERSE #11, IDW Publishing
- Métal hurlant #3, Humanoids Publishing

=== Films and TV series ===
- Futurama
- Titan AE
- Evolution
- Fantastic Four: World's Greatest Heroes
- Time Jam: Valerian & Laureline
- Replicant
- Spiders II: Breeding Ground

== Interviews ==
- Interview (in French)
- Interview Planete BD.com (in French)
- Interview sci-fi Universe.com)
- Interview scenario.com
- Interview actuabd.com)
- Interview bdbest.com
- TV interview 2008 sur Youtube
- TV interview 2010 sur Youtube
