= Shinobu Kaze =

Japanese manga artist

Shinobu Kaze (風 忍, Kaze Shinobu), pen name of Tomoaki Saitō (Saitō Tomoaki (斉藤智昭; born February 13, 1952 or 1958) is a Japanese mangaka.

His most well-known works, such as Ryu, Strongest Man on the Face of the Planet (地上最強の男 竜, Chijou Saikyou no Otoko Ryuu; 1977) and Violence becomes Tranquility were influenced by French science fiction comics, such as Moebius and Philippe Druillet, as well as artists such as Alphonse Mucha, Seijun Suzuki and Tadanori Yokoo.

== Biography ==
Saitō was born in Yokosuka. In high school he drew comics and met a colleague who knew manga artist Go Nagai. They went to Nagai's studio Dynamic Pro. After graduation, Saitō began working as Nagai's assistant, and adopted the name Kaze Shinobu. He began assisting Nagai in titles like Kikkai-kun and Gakuen Taikutsu Otoko; in 1971 he launched his own gag comic; Hyakuen Byōin (100-yen Hospital).

In 1974 one of Dynamic Pro's assistants brought to the studio a copy of Philipee Druillet's comic Lone Sloane. Although he didn't read French, the artwork inspired Kaze to draw a martial arts action comic, infused with science-fiction and spiritual imagery. In 1976 he launched ''Ryu, Strongest Man on the Face of the Planet'', serialized at Weekly Shonen Magazine. After that, Kaze published several one-shot comics, such as The Boy with a Government .45 (ガバメントを持った少年 Gabamento o motta shōnen; 1977), Violence becomes Tranquility (男は度胸 Otoko wa dokyō; 1980, published at Heavy Metal magazine) and Heart and Steel (1981, published at Epic magazine); the latter ones were among the first original manga published in English into the US. Those one-shots were later recollected in the book Violence and Peace.
