= Chantal Montellier =

French writer/artist

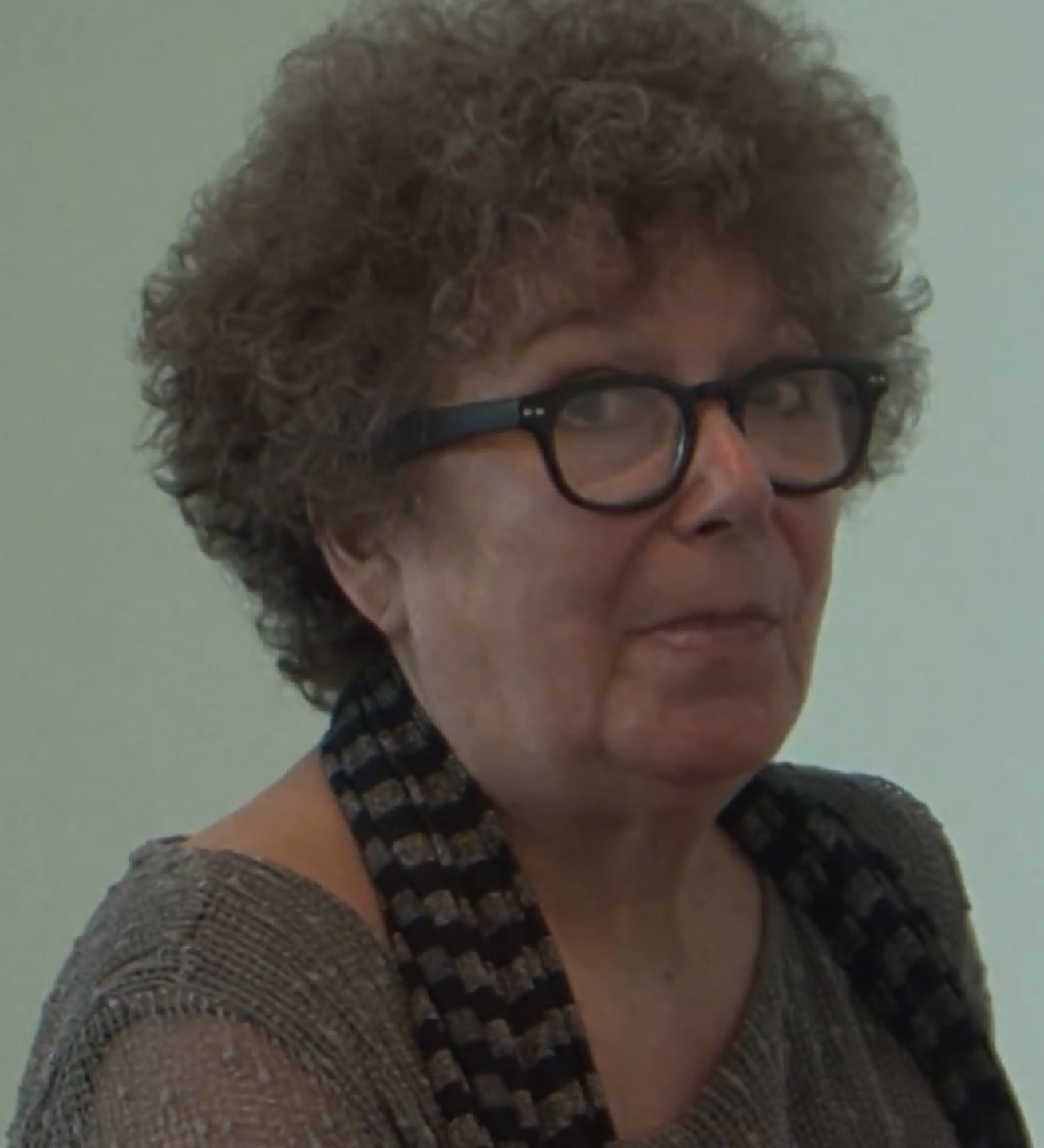
- Montellier interviewed at the Federal University of Rio de Janeiro in 2017
- Born: August 1, 1947 (age 79) Andrézieux-Bouthéon, Loire, France
- Notable works: 1996; Andy Gang; Les Damnés de Nanterre; Un deuil blanc Julie Bristol; Odile et les crocodiles

Chantal Montellier, born on August 1, 1947, in Bouthéon near Saint-Étienne in the Loire Department, is a French comics creator and artist, editorial cartoonist, novelist, and painter. As the first female editorial cartoonist in France, she is noted for pioneering women's involvement in comic books.

== Career ==
Chantal Montellier studied at the École Supérieure d'Art et Design Saint-Étienne from 1962 to 1969. From 1969 to 1973, she was a professor of visual arts in colleges and high schools. From 1989 to 1993, she taught courses at Paris 8 University. Starting in 1972, she worked as an editorial cartoonist for Combat syndicaliste, Politis, Maintenant, L'Humanité, L'Autre Journal, Marianne, France nouvelle, and Révolution, among others, at a time when she was the only woman exercising her talents in the male-dominated field of work. As a comics creator, she contributed notably at Charlie Mensuel, Métal Hurlant, Ah ! Nana, (À suivre), and Psikopat.

Her realistic drawing, often in black and white early on, recalls that of Jacques Tardi, José Muñoz, or even Guido Crepax. She integrated many "modernist" graphic experiments (like Bazooka (artist collective)) before settling on her own profoundly original aesthetic.

Montellier began publishing comic strips such as Andy Gang in Charlie Mensuel in 1974 and in the French feminist comics magazine Ah! Nana in 1976. Her dystopian strip 1996, originally appearing in Métal Hurlant, was reprinted in Heavy Metal in the United States in the late 1970s, bringing her work to the notice of Anglophone readers.

Chantal Montellier is one of the rare comic strip creators to have affirmed (and continues to affirm) her political and feminist engagement. For example, in Les Damnés de Nanterre, an investigative comic strip about Florence Rey, she takes apart the official version of the shootout at the Place de la Nation, which set the police against an anarchist group. She came to suffer consequences for it: when she was first invited to Lausanne, for the 2007 Lausanne International Comics Festival, her appearance was canceled on the pretext that her presence might bother the other authors there.

Among her projects is her personal web site where, since 2007, her autobiographical account De l'art et des cochons (Of Art and Pigs) prominently features her comics universe (its actresses and actors, publishers, etc.) and an album of comics that she describes, inside quotation marks, as "erotic."

In 2007 she co-founded, with Jeanne Puchol, the Prix Artémisia, named for Artemisia Gentileschi, a prize annually awarded to comics created by one or more women.

In 2017, she brought out a new, completely revised edition of Shelter Market published by Les Impressions Nouvelles and a novel inspired by her own life, Les vies et les morts de Cléo Stirner, in the literature collection of Éditions Goater.

== Political engagement ==
In 2012, Montellier supported Jean-Luc Mélenchon, the Left Party candidate in the presidential election.

== Publications ==
=== Comic strips and graphic novels ===
- 1996, Les Humanoïdes Associés, 1978
- Les Rêves du fou, Futuropolis, 1978
- Blues, Kesselring, 1979
- Andy Gang :
1. Andy Gang, Les Humanoïdes Associés, 1979
2. Andy Gang et le tueur de la Marne, Les Humanoïdes Associés, 1980
3. Joyeux Noël pour Andy Gang, Les Humanoïdes Associés, 1980
- Shelter, Les Humanoïdes Associés, 1980
- Lectures, Les Humanoïdes Associés, 1981
- Le Sang de la commune, Futuropolis, 1982
- Wonder city, Les Humanoïdes Associés, 1982
- La Toilette, storyline by Pierre Charras, Futuropolis, 1983
- Odile et les crocodiles, Les Humanoïdes Associés, 1983; reprint retouched by Acte Sud/L'An II in 2008
- L'esclavage c'est la liberté, Les Humanoïdes Associés, 1984
- Rupture, Les Humanoïdes Associés, 1985
- Un deuil blanc, Futuropolis, 1987
- Julie Bristol :
1. La Fosse aux serpents, Casterman, 1990
2. Faux sanglant, Dargaud, 1992
3. L'Île aux démons, Dargaud, 1994
- Voyages au bout de la crise, Dargaud, 1995
- Sa majesté la mouche, in Noire est la terre, collective, Autrement, 1996
- La Femme aux loups, Z'éditions, 1998
- Paris sur sang, Mystère au Père Lachaise, Dargaud, 1998
- Social Fiction, Vertige Graphic, 2003, compilation of the albums 1996, Wonder City, and Shelter; foreword by Jean-Pierre Dionnet
- Les Damnés de Nanterre, Denoël Graphic, 2005
- Sorcières mes sœurs, La Boîte à bulles, 2006
- Tchernobyl mon amour, Actes Sud, 2006
- The Trial, after Kafka, storyline by David Zane Mairowitz, Actes Sud, 2009
- L'Inscription, Actes Sud, 2011
- Shelter Market, new enlarged version of the album Shelter originally published in 1980, Les Impressions Nouvelles, 2017

=== Editorial cartooning ===
- Impressions sur "Betty" dans la "Force des sentiments", L'Autre Journal, March 26 to April 2, 1986
- Sous pression, Pop'com/Graphein, 2001

=== Novels ===
- Voyages au bout de la crise, Dargaud, 1995, illustrated novel
- La Dingue aux marrons, Baleine, 1997 (Le Poulpe)
- TGV, conversations ferroviaires, stories, Les Impressions Nouvelles, 2005
- Les Vies et les morts de Cléo Stirner, novel, Éditions Goater, 2017

== See also ==
- Franco-Belgian comics
- Women comics creators

== Bibliography ==
- Patrick Gaumer, "Montellier, Chantal", in Dictionnaire mondial de la BD (Paris: Larousse, 2010) ISBN 9782035843319, p. 606–607.
- Yves Lacroix (ed.), I am a camera: Chantal Montellier, auteur de bandes dessinées, CASB, 1993.
