= Fabrice Giger =

Literary publisher, and film and TV producer (born 1965)

Fabrice A Giger (born 7 January 1965 in Geneva, Switzerland) is a literary publisher and film and TV producer. The son of Swiss painter José Giger, he is well known for publishing thousands of comic books / graphic novels from such authors as Alejandro Jodorowsky, Mœbius, Enki Bilal and John Cassaday.

In 1988, at the age of 23, Giger took over the Paris-based publishing house Les Humanoïdes Associés (also known as Humanoids in English), its catalog, and brands such as Métal Hurlant (from which the American magazine Heavy Metal was adapted). In less than a decade, he turned it into a multimedia group, involved not only in comic book publishing, but also in CGI animation, visual effects, internet content and software development.

In 1995, he co-founded the CGI animation studio, Sparx*, with branches in France and Vietnam, and the production company Sparkling which went on to produce shows such as Rolie Polie Olie for which Giger won an Emmy Award in 2000 as executive producer.

In 1998, in Los Angeles, he founded Humanoids, Inc., the American counterpart of Les Humanoïdes Associés.

In the years 1999-2000, he partnered with directors Ridley Scott and Tony Scott to launch a website featuring original content based on Humanoids titles. The catalog has been a constant source of inspiration for filmmakers and the movie industry in general since the seventies and thus Giger sought to create a digital content platform to combine the talents from these different mediums. Despite producing hours of material, the site never took off due to the unfortunate timing of the bursting of the Internet bubble.

While having developed and published dozens of new titles every year in various genres since his inception of the company, with most of them having been translated into numerous languages, Giger published a new and limited series of the anthology Métal Hurlant between 2002 and 2004. A good portion of the original content created for the occasion was later adapted for television with the TV series Métal Hurlant Chronicles, that Giger exec-produced and which aired in October 2012.

At the end of 2004, Giger stepped down from all his duties and took a sabbatical of several years, including one spent in Pondicherry, India, near the Sri Aurobindo Ashram.

In 2008, he resumed his career as the group's CEO and publisher, which subsequently, in 2010, included a successful reboot of the publishing activities in the English language.

Following the increasing presence of Humanoids titles in Asia (the best-selling Sci-Fi graphic novel ever, The Incal, is still the record holder for having the highest sales of a non-Japanese graphic novel in Japan), including China, and in the European markets, Giger announced at the New York Comic Con in October 2018 a major foray into the American comic book industry with the creation of a new line of content and a shared universe.

In November 2021, Giger launched the film and television branch of Humanoids with the announcement of the adaptation of The Incal into a feature film, that he is producing.

Over his career, Giger has continuously developed and published graphic novels and spin-off series within The Incal universe, from the best-selling series The Metabarons in 1992 to titles such as Psychoverse, Dying Star and Kill Wolfhead in 2022 and 2023. All these titles make up a vast and contrasted universe and are potential material for additional films and television series.

Several other movies and television series are being developed and produced by Humanoids and its subsidiaries, including original content such as Whiskey On The Rocks for Disney+ and SVT1 which started shooting in October 2023.
