= Le Sommeil du monstre =

1998 graphic novel by Enki Bilal

Le Sommeil du monstre The Dormant Beast
- Date: 1998
- Publisher: Les Humanoïdes Associés

Creative team
- Writers: Enki Bilal
- Artists: Enki Bilal
- Colorists: Enki Bilal

Original publication
- Language: French
- ISBN: 2-7316-1230-4

Translation
- Publisher: Humanoids Publishing
- Date: 2000
- ISBN: 0-9672401-5-8

Chronology
- Followed by: 32 Décembre

Le Sommeil du monstre is a 1998 Franco-Belgian sci-fi comic book written and drawn by Enki Bilal, published by Les Humanoïdes Associés. It is the first volume of the Tétralogie du Monstre series. Translated into English as The Dormant Beast, it was published together with the following two volumes, 32 décembre and Rendez-vous à Paris, under the title The Beast Trilogy: Chapters 1 & 2.

== Plot synopsis ==
Set in New York 2023. Nike, the hero of the Dormant Beast, has a prodigious memory, which he uses to try to understand his past as a Yugoslav orphan. He must also come to terms with his violent and chaotic present, where obscurantism has become a flourishing business of worldwide manipulation.
