= Daniel Ceppi =

Swiss comics artist (1951–2024)

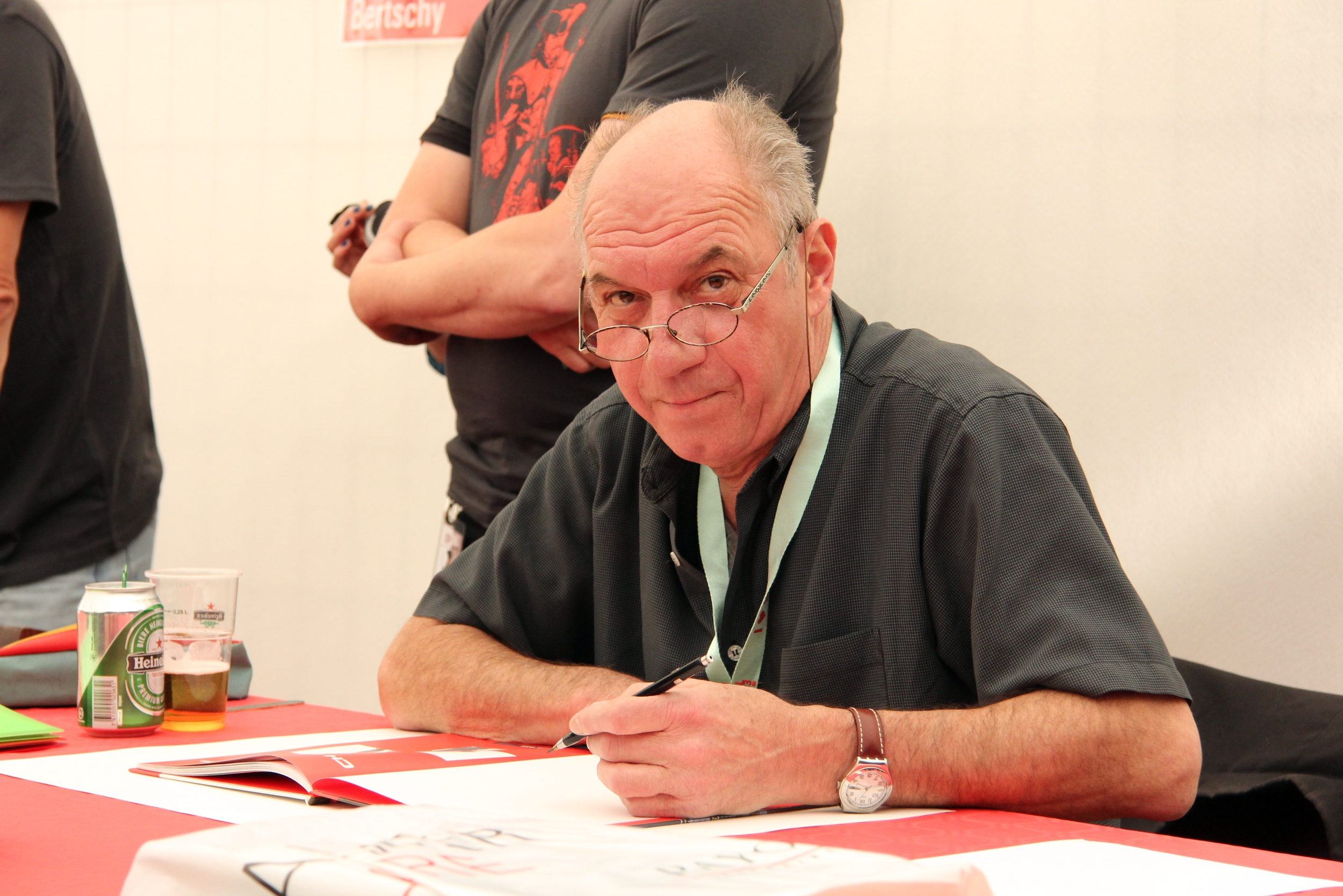
- Ceppi in 2013
- Born: 3 April 1951; Geneva, Switzerland
- Died: 4 November 2024 (aged 73)
- Education: Centre de formation professionnelle arts de Genève
- Occupation: Comics artist

Daniel Ceppi (3 April 1951 – 4 November 2024) was a Swiss comics artist. He was the author of the series Stéphane Clément, chroniques d'un voyageur.

== Life and career ==
Born in Geneva on 3 April 1951, Ceppi was the great-great-great-grandson of the inventor Georges-Auguste Leschot. At the age of 16, he exhibited a stained glass window in Carouge. He attended the Centre de formation professionnelle arts de Genève and self-published a novel titled Le Guêpier about a traveller named Stéphane Clément. In 1977, he published the first album in the series. During the 1980s, he began publishing with Casterman, switching from his previous publisher, Les Humanoïdes Associés. At the same time, he began publishing his illustrations in the magazine Métal hurlant. He then published editions 4 through 7 of the Stéphane Clément series under the title Une Aventure de Stéphane from 1981 to 1985.

Ceppi returned to Les Humanoïdes Associés in 1991 and wrote of Stéphane Clément travels to Cameroon, the Philippines, and Indonesia. In 2009, the publisher released a full collection of his works in the original black and white. After a hiatus, he returned to comics in 2017 with the one-shot Lady of Shalott, which told a story about the world of art in Geneva. This edition brought Stéphane Clément together with others in CH Confidentiel.

Ceppi died on 4 November 2024, at the age of 73.

== Publications ==
=== Stéphane Clément, chroniques d'un voyageur ===
- Le Guêpier (1977)
- À l'Est de Karakulak (1978)
- Le Repaire de Kolstov (1980)
- Les Routes de Bharata - La Malédiction de Surya (1983)
- L'Étreinte d'Howrah (1984)
- Captifs du chaos (1986)
- Pondicherry, filiation fatale (1995)
- Belfast, l'adieu aux larmes (1997)
- Vanina business (1999)
- L'Or bleu (2001)
- L'Engrenage turkmène (2010)
- Le Piège ouzbek (2012)

=== Others ===
- L'Ombre de Jaïpur (1981)
- Croco & co (1986)
- La Nuit des clandestins (1992)
- Les Aventures de Natrix (1993)
- Corps diplomatique (1991)
- Nom de code (2006, 2007, 2008)
- Lady of Shalott (2017)
