= Quatre? =

Four? ('Quatre?')
- Series: Hatzfeld Tetralogy or The Beast Trilogy
- Publisher: Casterman

Creative team
- Writers: Enki Bilal
- Artists: Enki Bilal

Original publication
- Date of publication: 2007

Translation
- Publisher: Humanoids Publishing

Quatre? is a French comic book by Enki Bilal, and the fourth album of the tetralogy featuring Nike Hatzfeld.
