= Serge Clerc =

French comic book artist and illustrator

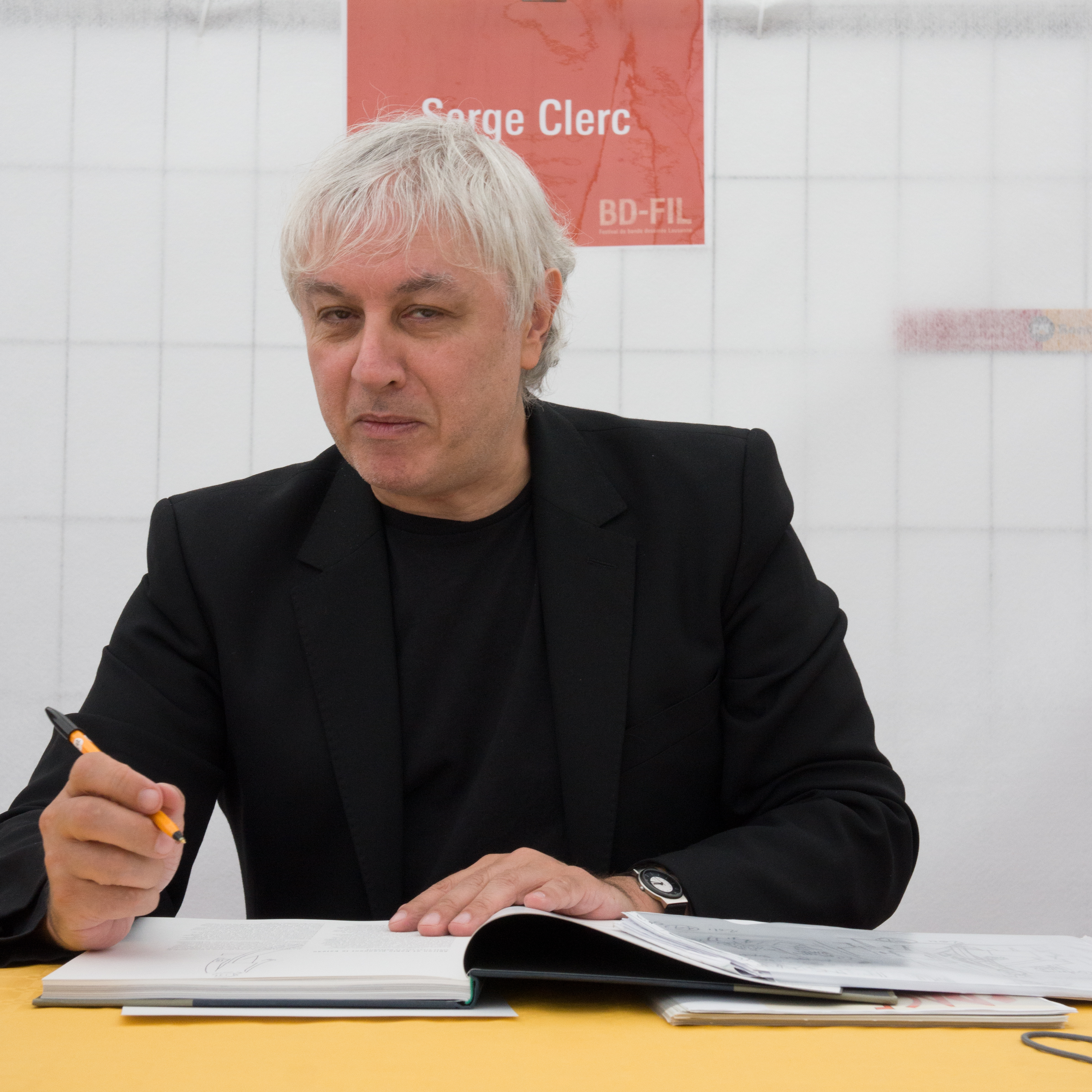
- Born: 12 October 1957 (age 69) Roanne, France
- Areas: Cartoonist, Penciller
- Notable works: Captain Futur; Sam Bronx et les Robots

Serge Clerc (born 12 October 1957) is a French comic book artist and illustrator. Serge Clerc began his professional career in 1975 in the monthly magazine Métal Hurlant, after having created his own fanzine, Absolutely Live. Initially a science-fiction artist, his story Captain Futur appeared in book form in 1979 by Les Humanoïdes Associés.

In the early 1980s Clerc's work regularly appeared in the British music magazines NME and Melody Maker. For the magazine Rock and Folk, he created the detective Phil Perfect and his alter-ego Sam Bronx, a series that was also printed in Métal Hurlant and in books by Les Humanoïdes Associés.

His retro themed work has been used on music albums by The Fleshtones (Speed Connection), Carmel (The Drum Is Everything) and Joe Jackson (Big World), as well as on a number of other albums and singles.

== Selected bibliography ==
- 1978 : Le Dessinateur Espion, Humanoïdes Associés
- 1979 : Captain Futur, collection Pied Jaloux, Les Humanoïdes Associés
- 1979 : Mélanie White, story Jean-Patrick Manchette, Hachette
- 1981 : Sam Bronx et les Robots, collection Atomium n°1, Magic Strip
- 1981 : Rocker, collection Metal Hurlant, Humanoïdes Associés
- 1982 : Mémoires de l'Espion, collection Autodafé, story José-Louis Bocquet, Humanoides Associés
- 1983 : La nuit du Mocambo, Humanoides Associés
- 1984 : Johnny Bahamas, Champaka
- 1984 : La légende du Rock 'n 'Roll, collection Sang pour sang, Humanoides Associés
- 1986 : Dans le décor, story François Landon, Gilou
- 1986 : Les histoires merveilleuses des Oncles Paul, collective, Vents d'Ouest
- 1986 : Meurtre dans le phare, collection Eldorado, story François Landon, Humanoides Associés
- 1987 : Serge Clerc, artiste et modèle, story François Landon, éditions Albin Michel
- 1988 : Manoir, story Madeleine De Mille, éditions Albin Michel
- 1990 : Night-Clubber, collection Affaires Intérieures, Comixland
- 1998 : L'orpheline de Mars, story François Sautereau, Nathan
- 1999 : L'irrésistible ascension, éd. Reporter
- 2000 : Les Limaces Rouges éd. Reporter
- 2006 : Nightclubbing Desperados, Champaka
- 2008 : Le Journal, Denoël Graphic
