= Bunker Palace Hôtel =

- Directed by: Enki Bilal
- Written by: Enki Bilal; Pierre Christin
- Produced by: Maurice Bernart
- Starring: Jean-Louis Trintignant; Carole Bouquet; Maria Schneider; Jean-Pierre Léaud
- Cinematography: Philippe Welt
- Edited by: Thierry Derocles
- Music by: Arnaud Devos; Philippe Eidel
- Distributed by: BAC Films
- Release date: 14 June 1989
- Running time: 95 minutes
- Country: France
- Language: French

Bunker Palace Hôtel is a 1989 French post-apocalyptic film by comics artist Enki Bilal.

== Plot ==
In the imaginary dictatorship of a futuristic world, rebellion has broken out. The men in power scramble to the 'Bunker Palace Hotel', a safehouse built long ago for this contingency. A rebel spy sneaks in and observes the raving of the powerful and decadent inhabitants. They wonder what has happened to their leader, who has not arrived.

== Cast ==
- Jean-Louis Trintignant : Holm
- Carole Bouquet : Clara
- Maria Schneider : Muriel
- Jean-Pierre Léaud : Solal
- Roger Dumas : Zarka
- Yann Collette : Orsini
- Philippe Morier-Genoud : Destoop
- Hans Meyer : Le président
- Benoît Régent : Nikolaï
- Jezabelle Amato : La matrone
- Svetozar Cvetković : Marco
- Snežana Nikšić
- Rada Đuričin
- Mira Furlan : Luise

== Production ==
The film was filmed in Belgrade, Serbia.
