= The Hunting Party (comics) =

1983 graphic novel

Partie de chasse The Hunting Party
- Cover of the French edition
- Date: 1983
- Series: Fins de Siècle; The Chaos Effect
- Publisher: Dargaud; Les Humanoïdes Associés

Creative team
- Writers: Pierre Christin
- Artists: Enki Bilal
- Colorists: Enki Bilal

Original publication
- Published in: Pilote magazine
- Issues: 1. M89–#M95
- Date of publication: 1981
- Language: French
- ISBN: 2-205-02424-8

Translation
- Publisher: HM Communications
- Date: 1984–1985

The Hunting Party (French: Partie de chasse) is a French political thriller graphic novel from 1983 written by Pierre Christin and illustrated by Enki Bilal. It is centered on a group of old, mostly retired or disgraced Communist bloc political leaders who meet in Poland for a bear-hunting party under the guide of Soviet Presidium leader Vasili Aleksandrovič Čevčenko, an aging revolutionary leader who, while retired from official duties, still retains much of his power and political influence. The year in which the story takes place is not specified, but it appears to be set in 1983, per Sergej Šavanidze's fictional biography on page 1, which states that "... at 44 (Šavanidze was born in 1939), he is the youngest member of the Politburo".

The characters, while reminiscing about their individual role in the gradual building of the Communist empire from the Revolution onwards, and the tragedies they had to endure along with growing disillusionment with the Socialist dream, plot to kill the new up-and-coming personality in the Politburo and thus stop his Stalinist political vision meant to ensure social immobilism for all the Eastern bloc.

== Publication history ==
=== Original publications in French ===
As in the case of many other French graphic novels, The Hunting Party was first published sequentially. Pilote magazine issued the story in two parts in 1981 and 1982 (#M89, M99). Later the story was published as an individual album in May, 1983 by Dargaud. A deluxe edition published by Éditions Rombaldi, of which 1200 copies were sold out in one day. In 1990 the authors included an Epitaph (1990) chapter, which reflects to the comics' events in retrospect (n.b. in 1989 the Eastern Bloc finally collapsed, urging the creators to revisit their comic created in the early Eighties). These post 1990 editions also contain fictional biographies of the characters and some other "extra" features.

=== English translations ===
Similarly to the French original, the first English translation had also been published in sequences. Heavy Metal magazine divided the story into ten parts in 1984–1985 (June 1984/Vol. 8 No. 3–March 1985/Vol. 8 No. 12). The first individual album format English version of the graphic novel was published by Catalan Communications in March, 1990 (ISBN 0874160537). In 2002 Humanoids Publishing presented the hardcover version, the first with the epilogue (ISBN 0-9672401-7-4).

== Plot synopsis ==
A Soviet Railway train passes through the station of Czaszyn, Poland, at night. The first characters of the novel are introduced: a young, unnamed French student, and Evgeni Golozov, a Ukrainian polyglot born in 1918 who is a member of the Central Committee and the de facto personal secretary to Vasili Aleksandrovič Čevčenko. Čevčenko, an old paralyzed man who lies in bed in the next car reading the Pravda, is the Éminence Grise behind the whole novel: born in 1895, he has fought in the Revolution of 1917, has met Lenin and Stalin and has been an executive of the Cheka and the GPU. The train finally reaches its destination in Królówka, Poland.

Shortly, other hunting party guests arrive at the platform: Ion Nicolescu (born on the Danube Delta, Romania, in 1918, an executive of the Securitate and member of the Central Committee of the Romanian Communist Party; and Janos Molnar, vice-Interior Minister at Budapest. Nicolescu was a follower of Gheorghiu-Dej in 1948 and in charge of the purges, but fell in political disgrace in 1952, until new purges favoured his return to power in the Securitate in 1957, after which he has been steadily climbing the ranks of the Central Committee.

The guests board a motorcade and depart towards Strzyżów, to Tadeusz Boczek's country estate, a large mansion evidently expropriated from wealthy landowners during the Communist takeover of Poland. There is a hint that Boczek was only granted such a property as honorable exile after political disgrace. He goes on to describe his memories of storks nesting on the multicoloured chimneys of his childhood village and pelicans going after fish in the Danube Delta. Vasil Strojanov, in his cynical and drunken way, is moved enough to recount his own experience as a partisan and member of the Dimitrov cabinet. Strojanov was the only one to escape hanging under charges of Titoism. Since then, Strojanov has had a recurring nightmare: a hideous monster-beast with sharp teeth, gray, stonelike skin and breasts similar to a female animal's mammaries, rising over a snow-covered landscape along with a red star. In the dream, the beast is Strojanov himself, or maybe "The Party itself, of which I am but a swearing mouth, a bloodthirsty claw". The conversation is interrupted by Schütz, who coolly disapproves of his comrades' "puerile idealism" and proudly reminds them he voted against Kafka's rehabilitation from charges of "bourgeois pessimism". Boczek saves everyone from further embarrassment by calling them to dinner.
