= Lone Sloane =

Publication information
- First appearance: Le Mystère des Abîmes (1966)
- Created by: Philippe Druillet

Lone Sloane is a science fiction comics character created in 1966 by the French cartoonist Philippe Druillet.

== Publication history ==
Lone Sloane first appeared in Druillet's own debut, Mystère des Abîmes, published in 1966. Other stories were published in the Franco-Belgian comics magazine Pilote from February 1970 to April 1971. The series was subsequently revamped by the author for Metal Hurlant magazine.

== Plot ==
Set 800 years after a catastrophic event called the "Great Fear", the stories feature Lone Sloane, who is caught by an entity called "He Who Seeks", after his space ship is destroyed. He is thrown into a different dimension, where he becomes a space rogue and freebooter with strange powers, and finds himself caught in an intergalactic struggle between space pirates, gigantic robots, dark gods, and other-dimensional entities. Very similar to Silver Surfer and Galactus, or Ulysses and the Greek gods, he is compelled to wander in a universe that is alien to him. It is also known for the quasi-baroque style of Druillet's artwork, which features Lovecraftian space nightmares mixed with Escherian mathematically inspired worlds.

== Publications ==
- Le Mystère des Abîmes ("The Mystery of the Abyss", 1966)
- Le Trone du Dieu Noir ("The Throne of the Black God"; in Pilote magazine #538, 1970)
- Les Iles du Vent Sauvage ("The Isle of the Doom Wind"; in Pilote #553, 1970)
- Rose (in Pilote N°562, 1970)
- Torquedara Varenkor: Le Pont sur les Etoiles ("The Bridge over the Stars"; in Pilote #569, 1970)
- O Sidarta (in Pilote #578, 1970)
- Terra (in Pilote #598, 1971)
- Delirius (written by Jacques Lob; in Pilote #651-666, 1972)
- Gail (in Metal Hurlant magazine #18-27, 1975-1976)
- Salammbo (in Metal Hurlant magazine #48-54, 1980)
- Salammbo 2: Carthago (1982)
- Salammbo 3: Matho (1986)
- Chaos (2000)
- Delirius 2 (2012, script by Lob, Jacques and Legrand, Benjamin)

== Translations ==
The first eight stories were translated into English by Jean-Marc Lofficier and Randy Lofficier. They were first serialized in black and white in Dark Horse's Cheval Noir comics anthology, then published as graphic novels by NBM Publishing. The rest of the stories have been translated into English by the magazine Heavy Metal, some of them serialized in the magazine (Gail in 1977 and 1978, Salammbo in 1980 and 1981) and Chaos published as an album.
