= Arzach =

Comic book collection by Jean Giraud

- The opening panel of Arzach
- First appearance: Métal Hurlant (1975)

Publication information
- Publisher: Les Humanoïdes Associés
- Formats: Original material for the series has been published as a strip in the comics anthology(s) Métal Hurlant.
- Original language: French
- Genre: Fantasy
- Publication date: 1975

Reprints
- Title(s): Heavy Metal
- The series has been reprinted, at least in part, in English.

Arzach (French: [aʁzak]) is a comic book collection of four wordless short stories by artist/author Jean 'Moebius' Giraud, which were originally published in the French sci-fi/fantasy comics magazine Métal Hurlant. The stories follow Arzach, a silent warrior who rides a pterodactyl-like creature through a strange, desolate landscape. The imagery and situations in Arzach are often compared to dreams or the subconscious. These stories had an enormous impact on the French comics industry, and the Arzach character is still among Moebius' most famous creations. It can be defined as a pantomime comic, fantasy comics or an experimental comic.

The spelling of the title, originally Arzach, was changed in each of the original short stories.

Moebius later revisited the character with a story called The Legend of Arzach. This later story contains dialogue, and it ties the Arzach stories into a previously unrelated Moebius story called The Detour.

Moebius' 2010 book Arzak: L'Arpenteur (Arzak: The Surveyor) was the first of a planned trilogy to explore the origin of the character. However, with the death of Jean Giraud in March 2012, this vision was never realised.

== Plot ==
=== Story 1 ("Arzach") ===
Arzach, a wandering knight-like figure, comes across a castle while flying on his white pterodactyl mount. While flying past, he sees a beautiful woman undressing in the window of a tower, seemingly held captive. Arzach is spotted by a guard, who shouts at him angrily before Arzach lassos him and carries him to a nearby dinosaur skeleton in the sand, while a crowd of guards watch unbothered. Arzach ties the man to the skeleton before flying back to the castle. He enters the tower and goes to the woman, but is surprised to find her face is hideously alien. Disappointed, he returns to his mount and flies away, leaving the guard tied.

=== Story 2 ("Harzach") ===
Arzach is travelling across a large plain of tentacle-like grass on his mount, with another pterodactyl mount carrying heavy luggage. The load becomes too heavy, and the mount is caught by the grass as it flies too close, seemingly dying. While feeding his surviving mount as they fly, Arzach spots a platform in the distance. The platform is guarded by a huge ape-like monster, which tries to attack Arzach when he flies too close. Arzach jumps off of his mount, landing on the platform and goading the monster into charging at him. As it does, Arzach steps off of the platform, being caught midair by his mount as the monster clutches onto the platform with one hand, tricked. Arzach and his mount eat peacefully as they watch the sun set, and the monster finally falls to be consumed by the grass.

=== Story 3 ("Arzak") ===
A man on a dune-buggy rides across the desert towards a stone temple. He arrives and goes inside, where a number of naked zombies stand around an empty room with a stone hut in the middle, connected to the temple with large tubes and pipes rising out of the top. As he walks to the hut, one zombie kicks the engineer in the back, knocking off his goggles and revealing that he too is a zombie. As the other zombies crowd around him, the engineer enters the hut, and begins fixing the engine inside. On a screen, Arzach can be seen pacing in the desert sand, his mount unconscious. As the engineer finishes fixing the engine, the mount awakes. The engineer watches Arzach return to his flight on the screen, before he returns to his own vehicle outside.

=== Story 4 ("Harzakc") ===
Arzach spies on a topless woman through the window of her door. After contemplating, he leaves, and walks along a massive skeleton. He spots a girl higher up on the bones, before losing his footing and falling through. He is caught by his mount, and soars above a landscape of men atop various other dinosaur-mounts, wielding pikes as they are directed through the stone maze landscape.

== Legacy ==
Arzach is credited as the inspiration for the final sequence, "Taarna", of the animated film Heavy Metal (1981).

Moebius' Arzach is a novel by Jean-Marc and Randy Lofficier, published by iBOOKS in August 2000. The book features a cover and inside illustrations by Moebius, and a map by J.O. Ladronn. The first half of the book is a novelisation of several Arzach stories. The second half recursively introduces John Gerard (a thinly disguised Jean Giraud) and family into the world of Arzach. A brief essay on the publishing history of Arzach concludes the book.

Arzach was one of Panzer Dragoon's major artistic influences. Jean Giraud even contributed in the creative process of Team Andromeda's game with original artwork.

Arzach inspired Hayao Miyazaki and he said in an interview that he directed Nausicaä of the Valley of the Wind under Moebius' influence.
