= The Black Order Brigade =

1979 Graphic novel by Enki Bilal

The Black Order Brigade (Les Phalanges de l'Ordre Noir)
- Les Phalanges de l'Ordre Noir
- Series: Fins de Siècle; The Chaos Effect
- Publisher: Dargaud; Les Humanoïdes Associés

Creative team
- Writers: Pierre Christin
- Artists: Enki Bilal

Original publication
- Date of publication: 1979 (Dargaud)
- Language: French
- ISBN: 2-205-01569-9

Translation
- Publisher: Catalan Communications; Humanoids Publishing
- Translator: Frank Wynne

The Black Order Brigade (1979; also published as The Ranks of the Black Order; French: Les Phalanges de l'Ordre Noir) is a French political thriller graphic novel written by Pierre Christin and illustrated by Enki Bilal.

== Plot outline ==
A fascist organization with roots in the Spanish Civil War, The Black Order Brigade, commits an act of terror in a small Aragonese village. All villagers are executed. The English journalist Pritchard, who once fought against the rebel faction during the civil war, decides to take revenge. He succeeds in assembling nine of his former comrades from the 15th International Brigade. One of them is now working for the Mossad in Tel-Aviv, another one is a rich screenwriter in Hollywood, another is a former member of the French Resistance. There is an Italian judge, a famous Polish writer, a Philosophy teacher in Germany and a priest in Spain, among others. They all meet again after so many years; they are old, sick and weak, but full of passions and memories of the past.

The chase starts in Spain, where the local contact is killed in a bomb attack (attributed to the infamous Brigade). The group then travels around Europe trying to locate the fascist paramilitary old-timer gang. A small group of elderly people hunts another group of people at the same age, and it unravels a showdown with the past and the present.
