= Sparx* Studios =

French-Vietnamese VFX and animation studio

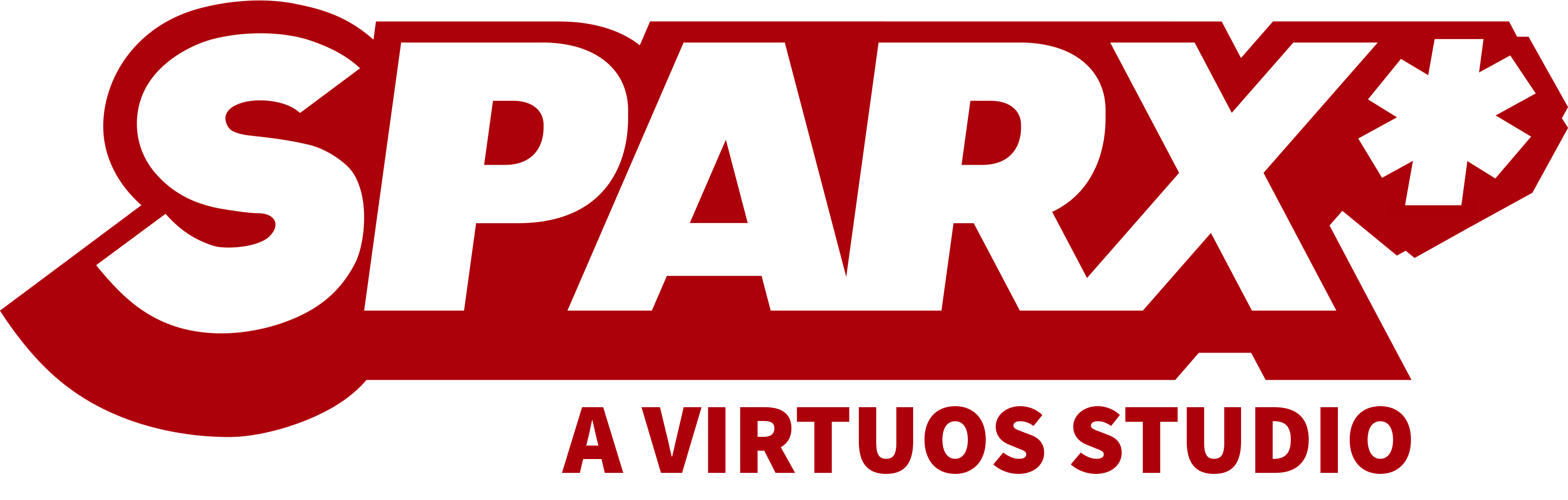
- Formerly: Sparx Animation Studios (1995–2011)
- Type: Subsidiary
- Industry: Animation; Video games
- Founded: June 23, 1995; 31 years ago
- Founder: Jean Christophe Bernard; Guillaume Hellouin; Fabrice Giger; Didier Montarou
- Headquarters: Ho Chi Minh City, Vietnam
- Key people: Renaud Biscarrat (Chief Executive Officer/President); Samuel Stevenin (General Manager)
- Owner: Virtuos
- Number of employees: 400+
- Website: sparx.com

Sparx* Studios (stylized as SPARX*) is a French-Vietnamese visual effects, 3D art, game and animation studio. Originally founded as Sparx Animation Studios in 1995, it initially worked primarily on animated feature films. In 2011, Virtuos purchased the company and reopened in Ho Chi Minh City the same year. The current incarnation of the company primarily works on animation for video games as well as VFX work for feature films.

== History ==
Sparx* Studios was founded in 1995 and opened in 2002, by Jean-Christophe Bernard, Guillaume Hellouin and Fabrice Giger. They worked on Rolie Polie Olie with Nelvana and which won a Daytime Emmy Award and another Gemini Award for 'Outstanding Special Class Animated Program'.

The company produced the fully computer-animated movie Igor, starring John Cusack and Molly Shannon which was released on September 19, 2008, to mixed reviews and commercial success. They also worked on the last 3 seasons of Star Wars Rebels.

The company would go on a downward spiral in later years, closing down its Paris office in 2008 as well as their American and Vietnamese offices in 2010, leaving only the Shanghai offices open. In 2011, Virtuos acquired the company and reopened the Ho Chi Minh City offices the same year.

== Film contributions ==
Title	Type	Release Date	Publisher
Pierre et le loup	Shorts and Music Videos	1995	Canal+
Bob & Scott	TV series	1996	-
My Life in Pink	Feature Film	1997	La Sept Cinéma
Rolie Polie Olie	TV series	1998	Nelvana
Smart Planet Advance	TV series	1999-2000	TPS Animation Studios
À deux sur la comète	TV series	2000	-
Bella ciao	-	2001	-
Changing Faces: The Best of Louise	-	2001	-
Grégoire Moulin contre l'humanité	Feature Film	2001	Centre Européen Cinématographique Rhône-Alpes
Jerry	Short Film	2001	-
Le nouveau big bang	Short Film	2001	-
Molly, Star-Racer	TV series	2001	Sav! The World Productions
Purgatoire	TV series	2001	-
R. Mertonensis	TV series	2001	C.R.R.A.V
Thomas in Love	Feature Film	2001	JBA Production
Les filles, l'âne et les boeufs	TV series	2002	Centre National du Cinéma et de l'Image Animée
Rolie Polie Olie: The Great Defender of Fun	TV series	2002	Nelvana
The World of Happy Planet	TV series	2002-03	EnSky Studios
Youri, the Spaceman	Shorts	2002	Sparkling
Dragon Hunters	Short Film	2003	-
Drawing Time with Happy Planet	Video series	2003	EnSky Studios
Summer in the Golden Valley	Feature Film	2003	-
Move with Mimik	Video series	2003-04	EnSky Studios
Around The World with Happy Planet	Video series	2003-04	EnSky Studios
Move and Learn with Happy Planet	Video series	2003-04	EnSky Studios
Care Bears: Journey to Joke-a-lot	DTV Productions	2004	Nelvana
Mickey's Twice Upon a Christmas	DTV Productions	2004	Walt Disney Pictures
Grand Odyssey	Short Film	2005	-
Zoé Kezako	TV series	2006-2014	Sparkling
Argai	Short Film	2006	-
Bedtime Stories	Short Film	2006	-
Gazoon	TV series	2007	Sparkling
Igor	Animated Feature Film	2008	Exodus Productions
The Avengers	Feature Film	2012	Marvel Studios
Elmo's Alphabet Challenge	DTV Productions	2012	Sesame Workshop
Fanboy & Chum Chum	TV series	2013-2014	Frederator Studios and Sony Pictures Television
Teenage Mutant Ninja Turtles	Feature Film	2014	Paramount Pictures
Zorro: The Chronicles	TV series	2014	Cyber Group Studios
Avengers: Age of Ultron	Feature Film	2015	Marvel Studios
Jurassic World	Feature Film	2015	Universal Pictures
Star Wars: The Force Awakens	Feature Film	2015	Lucasfilm
Star Wars Rebels (Starting from Season 2)	TV series	2015–18	Lucasfilm Animation
Captain America: Civil War	Feature Film	2016	Marvel Studios
Rogue One: A Star Wars Story	Feature Film	2016	Lucasfilm
Warcraft	Feature Film	2016	Universal Pictures
Kong: Skull Island	Feature Film	2017	Warner Bros. Pictures
Star Wars: The Last Jedi	Feature Film	2017	Lucasfilm
Transformers: The Last Knight	Feature Film	2017	Paramount Pictures
Valerian and the City of a Thousand Planets	Feature Film	2017	STXfilms
Aquaman	Feature Film	2018	Warner Bros. Pictures
Avengers: Infinity War	Feature Film	2018	Marvel Studios
Black Panther	Feature Film	2018	Marvel Studios
Bumblebee	Feature Film	2018	Paramount Pictures
Ready Player One	Feature Film	2018	Warner Bros. Pictures
Solo: A Star Wars Story	Feature Film	2018	Lucasfilm
Aladdin	Feature Film	2019	Walt Disney Pictures
Captain Marvel	Feature Film	2019	Marvel Studios
The Addams Family	Animated Feature Film	2019	Metro-Goldwyn-Mayer
Robota	Short Film	2019	-
Star Wars: The Rise of Skywalker	Feature Film	2019	Lucasfilm
Vic & The Magic Sword	Animated Feature Film	2019	Studio 100 Animation
The Mandalorian (Season 1 & 2)	TV series	2019-20	Industrial Light & Magic
Alien Worlds	TV series	2020	Framestore
Jurassic World Camp Cretaceous	TV series	2020	Netflix
Puppy Dog Pals	TV series	2020	Rainbow CGI
Space Jam: A New Legacy	Feature Film	2021	Warner Bros. Pictures
The Addams Family 2	Animated Feature Film	2021	Metro-Goldwyn-Mayer
Rumble	Animated Feature Film	2021	Paramount Animation
Sing 2	Animated Feature Film	2021	Universal Pictures
Minions: The Rise of Gru	Animated Feature Film	2022	Universal Pictures

== Game Contributions ==
Title	Platform(s)	Release date	Developer
League of Legends	PC	-	Riot Games
Smite	PC	-	Hi-Rez Studios
Fallout 4	PlayStation 4, Xbox One, PC	2015	Bethesda Softworks
Deus Ex: Mankind Divided	PlayStation 4, Xbox One, PC	2016	Eidos-Montréal
Farming Simulator	PlayStation 4, Xbox One, PC	2016	Giants Software
Killer Instinct 3	Xbox One, PC	2016	-
Forza Motorsport 7	Xbox One, PC	2017	Turn 10 Studios
NBA 2K18	PlayStation 4, Xbox One, PC	2017	2K
Call of Duty: Black Ops 4	PlayStation 4, Xbox One, PC	2018	Treyarch
Detroit: Become Human	PlayStation 4, PC	2018	Quantic Dream
The Elder Scroll Online: Summerset	PlayStation 4, Xbox One, PC	2018	Bethesda Softworks
Age of Empires II: Definitive Edition	PC	2019	Microsoft
Borderlands 3	PlayStation 4, Xbox One, PC	2019	2K
Planet Zoo	PC	2019	Frontier Developments
Star Wars Jedi: Fallen Order	PlayStation 4, Xbox One, PC	2019	Respawn Entertainment
The Outer Worlds	PlayStation 4, Xbox One, PC, Nintendo Switch	2019	Obsidian Entertainment
Vader Immortal: A Star Wars VR Series	Oculus Quest, Microsoft Windows	2019	ILMxLab
The Dark Pictures Anthology: Little Hope	PlayStation 4, Xbox One, PC	2020	Supermassive Games
Demon's Souls	PlayStation 5	2020	Japan Studio
Grounded	Xbox, PC	2020	Obsidian Entertainment
Legends of Runeterra	PC, Apple Store, Google Store	2020	Riot Games
Marvel's Avengers	PlayStation 4, Xbox One, PC	2020	Crystal Dynamics
Microsoft Flight Simulator	PC	2020	Asobo Studio
Ride 4	PlayStation 4, Xbox One, PC	2020	Milestone
Rocket Arena	PlayStation 4, Xbox One, PC	2020	Final Strike Games
Star Shaman	Oculus Rift	2020	Ikimasho
Star Wars: Tales from the Galaxy's Edge	Oculus Quest	2020	ILMxLab
Tell Me Why	Xbox, PC	2020	Dontnod Entertainment
Valorant	PC	2020	Riot Games
SpongeBob SquarePants: The Cosmic Shake	Nintendo Switch, PlayStation 4, Windows, Xbox One	2023	Purple Lamp

== Commercials ==
Brand	Product Name	Year
TF!	Soccer ID	1997
France 5	Les Zouzous	1999
Eurosport	Euro 2000	2000
Télétoon	Télétoon Advance	2000
13th Street	Reface	2001
France 3	T O 3	2002
Piwi	Les Vacances de Piwi	2003
Pepsi	Rapido In the hit TV Show, RATZ	2005
Pepto Bismol	Eating Much Sweets	2007
Mountain Dew	Baja Blast	2009
7-Up	Razmo In the Hit TV Show, RATZ	2010
Snuggie	Being Bored	2017
