= Rendez-vous à Paris =

Appointment in Paris ('Rendez-vous à Paris')
- Rendez-vous à Paris
- Series: Hatzfeld Tetralogy or The Beast Trilogy
- Publisher: Casterman

Creative team
- Writers: Enki Bilal
- Artists: Enki Bilal

Original publication
- Date of publication: 2006
- ISBN: 2-203-35332-5

Translation
- Publisher: Humanoids Publishing

Rendez-vous à Paris is a French comic album by Enki Bilal, the third in the tetralogy featuring Nike Hatzfeld.
