= Exterminator 17 =

French Comic Strip from Metal Hurlant

Exterminator 17 (Exterminateur 17)
- Cover of 2002 edition
- Date: 1977
- Publisher: Les Humanoïdes Associés

Creative team
- Writers: Jean-Pierre Dionnet
- Artists: Enki Bilal
- Colorists: Patricia Bilal; Dan Brown, 2002 ed.

Original publication
- Published in: Métal Hurlant
- Issues: 1. 11 - #19
- Date of publication: 1976
- Language: French
- ISBN: 2-902123-77-9

Translation
- Publisher: Humanoids Publishing
- Date: 2002
- ISBN: 1-930652-50-X
- Translator: Justin Kelly

Exterminator 17 (French: Exterminateur 17) is a French comic story written by Jean-Pierre Dionnet and drawn by Enki Bilal. It appeared in Metal Hurlant magazine in 1979. A second trilogy, entitled La Trilogie d'Ellis drawn by Igor Baranko, was published in 2003–2008.
