= Heavy Metal: Geomatrix =

2001 video game

- Arcade flyer
- Developer: Capcom
- Publishers: Sega (Arcade); Capcom (Dreamcast)
- Director: Obata Shinichiro
- Composer: Tetsuya Shibata
- Platforms: Arcade, Dreamcast
- Release: Dreamcast: JP: July 12, 2001; NA: September 12, 2001; EU: April 26, 2002; Arcade: JP: September 2001
- Genre: Fighting
- Mode: Up to 4 players simultaneously
- Arcade system: Sega NAOMI

Heavy Metal: Geomatrix (Note: Japanese: ヘビーメタル ジオマトリックス, Hepburn: Hebī Metaru Jiomatorikkusu) is a 3D arena fighting video game released in 2001 by both Sega and Capcom for the Sega NAOMI and Dreamcast, based upon the Heavy Metal license.

Using similar perspective and control scheme to Capcom's Spawn: In the Demon's Hand, the game presents up to 4-player combats in large arenas in what is seen as a follow-up to the basics of Capcom's Power Stone series, although more oriented to weapon fighting/shooting and a serious and dark cyberpunk tone because of the Heavy Metal universe setting. The game features a soundtrack of licensed music by artists such as Megadeth, Halford, W.A.S.P., Corrosion of Conformity, Entombed and Dust to Dust. A soundtrack CD featuring songs used in the game as well as songs from other artists was released by Sanctuary Records to tie in with the game.

== Reception ==
Reception

Aggregate score
Aggregator	Score
Metacritic	58/100

Review scores
Publication	Score
Computer and Video Games	4/10
Edge	5/10
Famitsu	27/40
Game Informer	3/10
GamePro	4/5
GameRevolution	C−
GameSpot	3.4/10
GameSpy	7.5/10
IGN	7.5/10
Jeuxvideo.com	8/20

The Dreamcast version received "mixed" reviews according to the review aggregation website Metacritic. In Japan, Famitsu gave it a score of 27 out of 40.

Also in Japan, Game Machine listed the arcade version on their November 1, 2001 issue as being the tenth most-successful arcade game of the month.
