= Alain Voss =

French-Brazilian comics artist (1946–2011)

- Born: 29 April 1946; Paris, France
- Died: 13 May 2011 (aged 65); Lisbon, Portugal
- Other names: Al Voss
- Occupation: Comics artist

Alain Voss (29 April 1946 – 13 May 2011), also known as Al Voss, was a French-Brazilian comics artist.

== Biography ==
Born in France, the son of a German father and a French mother, he spent his early life in Brazil, and debuted in comics magazines in that country and executing LP covers in the 1960s. He moved to France in 1972. From 1975 he worked for the experimental Metal Hurlant magazine with series including that of the punk rocker Heilman where Voss incorporates swastikas and other Nazi fanfare. (1978),Tobiaze and parodies of famous comics characters such as Popeye, Asterix and Superman. He returned to Brazil in 1981, and during the rest of his life collaborated with Brazilian publishers such as Editora Ondas and Press-Maciota. In 1982 he won the European Album of the Year Award for Adrénaline.

In 2009 he suffered a first stroke: after recovering, he launched the series Anarcity, influenced by Philip K. Dick's works, and the strip Zensetos.

Voss spent the last part of his life in Lisbon, Portugal, where he died of a stroke in May 2011. He was also known for designing album covers for the Brazilian rock band Os Mutantes.
