= Pierre Christin =

French comics writer

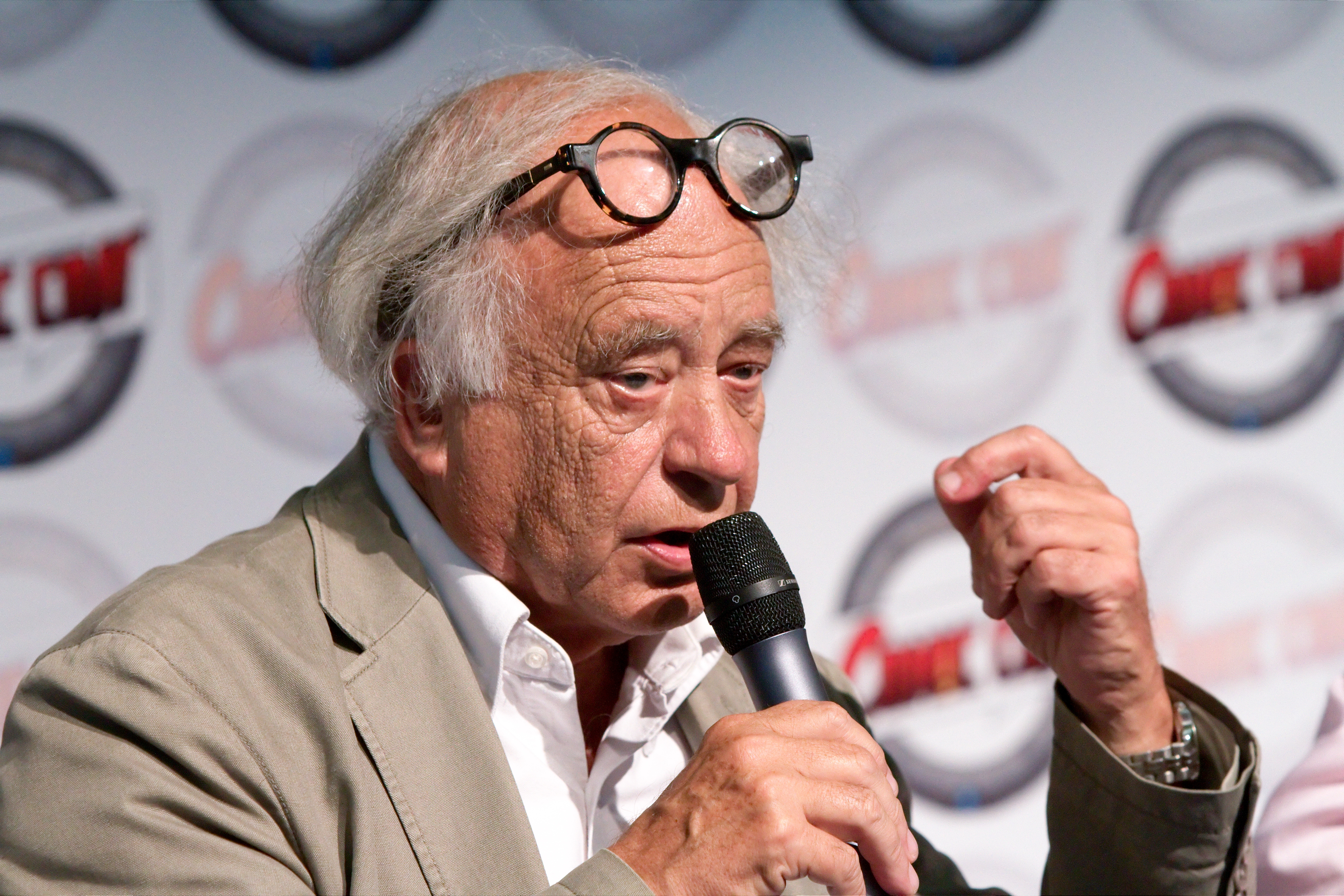
- Christin in 2010
- Born: 27 July 1938 Saint-Mandé, Val-de-Marne, France
- Died: 3 October 2024 (aged 86) Paris, France
- Area: Writer
- Pseudonym: Linus
- Notable works: Valérian and Laureline; La Ville qui n'existait pas La voyageuse de la petite ceinture Rumeurs sur le Rouerge
- Awards: Full list

Pierre Christin (French: [kʁistɛ̃]; 27 July 1938 – 3 October 2024) was a French comics writer.

== Biography ==
Christin was born at Saint-Mandé on 27 July 1938.

After graduating from the Sorbonne, Christin pursued graduate studies in political science at SciencesPo and became a professor of French literature at the University of Utah, Salt Lake City. His first comics story, Le Rhum du Punch, illustrated by his childhood friend Jean-Claude Mézières, was published in 1966 in Pilote magazine. Christin returned to France the following year to join the faculty of the University of Bordeaux. That year he again collaborated with Mézières to create the science-fiction series Valérian and Laureline for Pilote. The first episode was Les Mauvais Rêves (Bad Dreams).

In addition to the ongoing Valérian, Christin meanwhile wrote several other comics one-shots, including The City That Didn't Exist (La Ville qui n'existe pas), The Black Order Brigade (Les Phalanges de l'ordre noir) and The Hunting Party (Partie de chasse) (all illustrated by Enki Bilal). Among the many European comics artist he collaborated with were Enki Bilal, Jacques Tardi, Alexis, Raymond Poïvet, Jijé, Annie Goetzinger, Daniel Ceppi, and François Boucq. He also wrote screenplays and science-fiction novels.

Christin died on 3 October 2024, at the age of 86.

== Awards ==
- 1976: Angoulême International Comics Festival, Best French Author
- 1986: Angoulême International Comics Festival, Library Readers Award, for La voyageuse de la petite ceinture
- 1995: Haxtur Awards, Spain, nominated for Best Short Comic Strip, for El Círculo del poder (The Circles of Power)
- 1997: Angoulême International Comics Festival, Tournesol Award, for Les otages de l'Ultralum (Hostages of the Ultralum)
- 1996: Max & Moritz Prizes, Germany, Best International Writer
- 2019: Angoulême International Comics Festival René Goscinny award

== Other sources ==
- Pierre Christin publications in Pilote BDoubliées (in French)
- Pierre Christin albums Bedetheque (in French)
