= H1 (comics) =

American comic book imprint

- Parent company: Humanoids Publishing
- Status: Unknown
- Founded: October 2019
- Founder: Kwanza Osajyefo; Carla Speed McNeil; Yanick Paquette
- Defunct: February 2021
- Country of origin: United States
- Key people: John Cassaday (Chief Creative Officer); Mark Waid (Director of Creative Development); Fabrice Sapolsky (Senior Editor); Amanda Lucido (Assistant Editor)
- Publication types: Comics and graphic novels
- Fiction genres: Various genres
- Owner: Les Humanoïdes Associés
- Official website: Humanoids' official announcement

H1 is an American comic book imprint owned by Humanoids Publishing, which is owned by French publisher Les Humanoïdes Associés.

== History ==
H1 was founded in October 2018 by Kwanza Osajefyo, Carla Speed McNeil and Yanick Paquette as an imprint of Les Humanoïdes Associés. John Cassaday later joined as Chief Creative Officer, while Mark Waid joined as Director of Creative Development.

== Crew ==
- Kwanza Osajefyo: co-founder; writer
- Carla Speed McNeil: co-founder; writer
- Yanick Paquette: co-founder; character designer; cover artist
- John Cassaday: Chief Creative Officer
- Mark Waid: Director of Creative Development; writer
- Fabrice Sapolsky: Senior Editor
- Amanda Lucido: Assistant Editor

== List of publications ==
=== H1 Universe ===
- H1 Ignition
  - Written by Mark Waid, drawn by Philippe Briones
  - One-shot; April 3, 2019 (Free Comic Book Day)
  - This one-shot issue starts the H1 franchise, serving as prologue to the series Ignited, Strangelands and Omni. After years of human-made crises around the Earth, the planet itself has decided to respond by causing the "Ignition", which results on many humans around the world receiving their own superpowers, turning them into "Ignited". As a few people want to discover the truth about this phenomenon, a mysterious benefactor plans to recruit them.
- Ignited
  - Written by Mark Waid and Kwanza Osajefyo, drawn by Phil Briones
  - 10 issues; June 5, 2019 – January 20, 2021
  - A year after a shooting inside Phoenix Academy High happened during the Ignition, six students turned Ignited join together to prevent another similar crisis in their school.
- Strangelands
  - Written by Magdalene Visaggio and Darcie Little Badger, drawn by Guillermo Sanna
  - 8 issues; July 17, 2019 – August 2, 2020
  - A "married couple" is on the run while attempting not to lose control of their powers.
- Omni
  - Written by Devin Grayson, drawn by Alitha Martinez
  - 10 issues; August 14, 2019 – February 4, 2021
  - A former physician attempts to deal with her past while trying to discover the secret behind the Ignited.
- Life of an Ignited
  - Written by Carla Speed McNeil, drawn by Meredith Laxton
  - A bonus story included in the issues of Ignited, Strangelands and Omni, featuring backstories about other people turned into Ignited.

=== H1 Originals ===
- Meyer
  - Written by Jonathan "Swifty" Lang, drawn by Andrea Mutti and Shawn Martinbrough
  - Graphic novel; September 25, 2019
  - Jewish-American mobster Meyer Lansky gets involved with a young janitor for a last job before he gets into retirement.
- The Big Country
  - Written by Quinton Peeples, drawn by Dennis Calero
  - Graphic novel; November 20, 2019
  - Set in 1978, an old-fashioned Sheriff named Grissom Callahan must question his life and methods when a serial killer threatens his town.
- Nicnevin and the Bloody Queen
  - Written by Helen Mullane, drawn by Dom Reardon and Matthew Dow Smith
  - Graphic novel; March 11, 2020
  - The enigmatic Nicnevin Oswald must deal with a series of ghastly murders committed as an attempt to unleash the power of the ancient gods of Great Britain.
