= Métal Hurlant =

French comics anthology series

- Mœbius cover for issue number 1 of Métal Hurlant.

Publication information
- Publisher: (vol. 1); Les Humanoïdes Associés (vol. 2); Humanoids Publishing/DC Comics (vol. 3); Les Humanoïdes Associés
- Schedule: Monthly
- Format: Ongoing series
- Genre: Science fantasy
- Publication date: (vol. 1); December 1974 – July 1987 (vol. 2); July 2002 – November/December 2004 (vol. 3); September 2021—
- No. of issues: (vol. 1); 133 (vol. 2); 14 (vol. 3); 18+

Creative team
- Created by: Jean Giraud; Philippe Druillet; Jean-Pierre Dionnet; Bernard Farkas

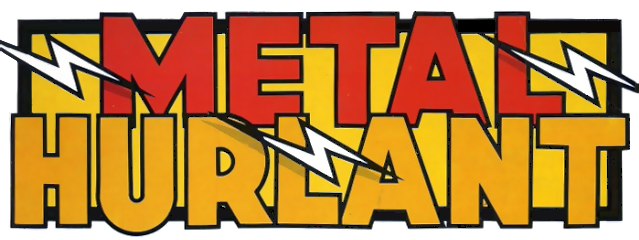
Métal hurlant logo.

Métal Hurlant (French pronunciation: [metal yʁlɑ̃]; literal translation: "Howling Metal," "Screaming Metal") is a French comics anthology of science fiction and horror comics stories. Originally created in 1974, the anthology ceased publication in 1987, but was revived between 2002 and 2004 in multilingual editions, and then again in 2020. In 2024 a Kickstarter was launched to revive the anthology; the first issue was released in June 2025.

Emphasizing complex graphics, cinematic imagery and surreal storylines, Métal Hurlant was highly influential throughout the world as one of the first mature expressions of "adult" comic book making. Apart from comics, the original Métal Hurlant contained articles about science fiction books and movies, as well as music and video game reviews.

== History ==
Métal Hurlant was created in December 1974 by comics artists Jean Giraud (better known as Mœbius) and Philippe Druillet together with journalist-writer Jean-Pierre Dionnet and financial director Bernard Farkas. The four were collectively known as "Les Humanoïdes Associés" (United Humanoids), which became the name of the publishing house releasing Métal Hurlant.

Content from Métal Hurlant was republished in English in the United States by National Lampoon under the title Heavy Metal. It was published in Germany under the title Schwermetall.

The magazine was originally released quarterly; it consisted of 68 pages, of which only 16 were in colour. Contributors included Mœbius and Druillet, depicting such characters as Arzach and Lone Sloane. Later issues featured Richard Corben, Alejandro Jodorowsky, Enki Bilal, Caza, Serge Clerc, Alain Voss, Berni Wrightson, Nicole Claveloux, Milo Manara, Frank Margerin, Masse, Chantal Montellier, Hajime Sorayama and many others.

The magazine went bankrupt in 1980 but managed to keep publishing. It became bi-monthly with issue #7 and monthly with #9.

Métal Hurlant ceased publication in July 1987.

=== 2002 revival ===
Métal Hurlant began publishing again in July 2002 by Humanoids Publishing, with a French, English, Spanish and Portuguese version, under the French name. As a "two-headed", transatlantic (France-US) magazine, led by Fabrice Giger in Los Angeles, it published original short stories, sometimes related to existing or to be published comic books. Its aim was to discover young creators and promote the products from the publisher. This incarnation of the magazine ceased publication with issue #14, dated November/December 2004.

=== 2021 revival ===
Vincent Bernière launched Metal Hurlant for 2021. This third volume of Métal Hurlant was launched via crowdfunding, on the KissKissBankBank platform. The first issue was published 29 September, with four issues a year (two with new content and two with classic content) planned. The third issue was published in March 2022, and included the story "Aquarium" by French author Léo Quievreux.

A Polish edition of the relaunched magazine, overlapping with reprints of classic issues, premiered in December 2021.

=== 2025 revival ===
In November 2024, Humanoids announced that they would be relaunching an English version of the magazine, and began a Kickstarter crowdfunding campaign for the first issue on 13 November 2024. The magazine returned to print in June 2025 as a quarterly edition.

== Stories ==
Stories that were published in the original Métal Hurlant include:

- Arzach
- The Incal
- Exterminator 17
- Jeremiah
- Lone Sloane
- Milady 3000
- The Zombies That Ate the World by Guy Davis and Jerry Frissen
- The Long Tomorrow by Dan O'Bannon and Jean Giraud
- 1996 by Chantal Montellier

== Adaptations ==
Some of their titles have gone on to be adapted into other media.

A live-action TV series based on Métal Hurlant titled Métal Hurlant Chronicles was released in France in 2012–2014. A French-United Kingdom co-production, the series consists of 12 half-hour episodes over two seasons. Featured actors include Rutger Hauer, Scott Adkins, Michael Jai White, Karl E. Landler, Joe Flanigan, David Belle, Matt Mullins, and James Marsters. In the United States, the series began airing on the Syfy Channel on 14 April 2014.
