= Annie Goetzinger =

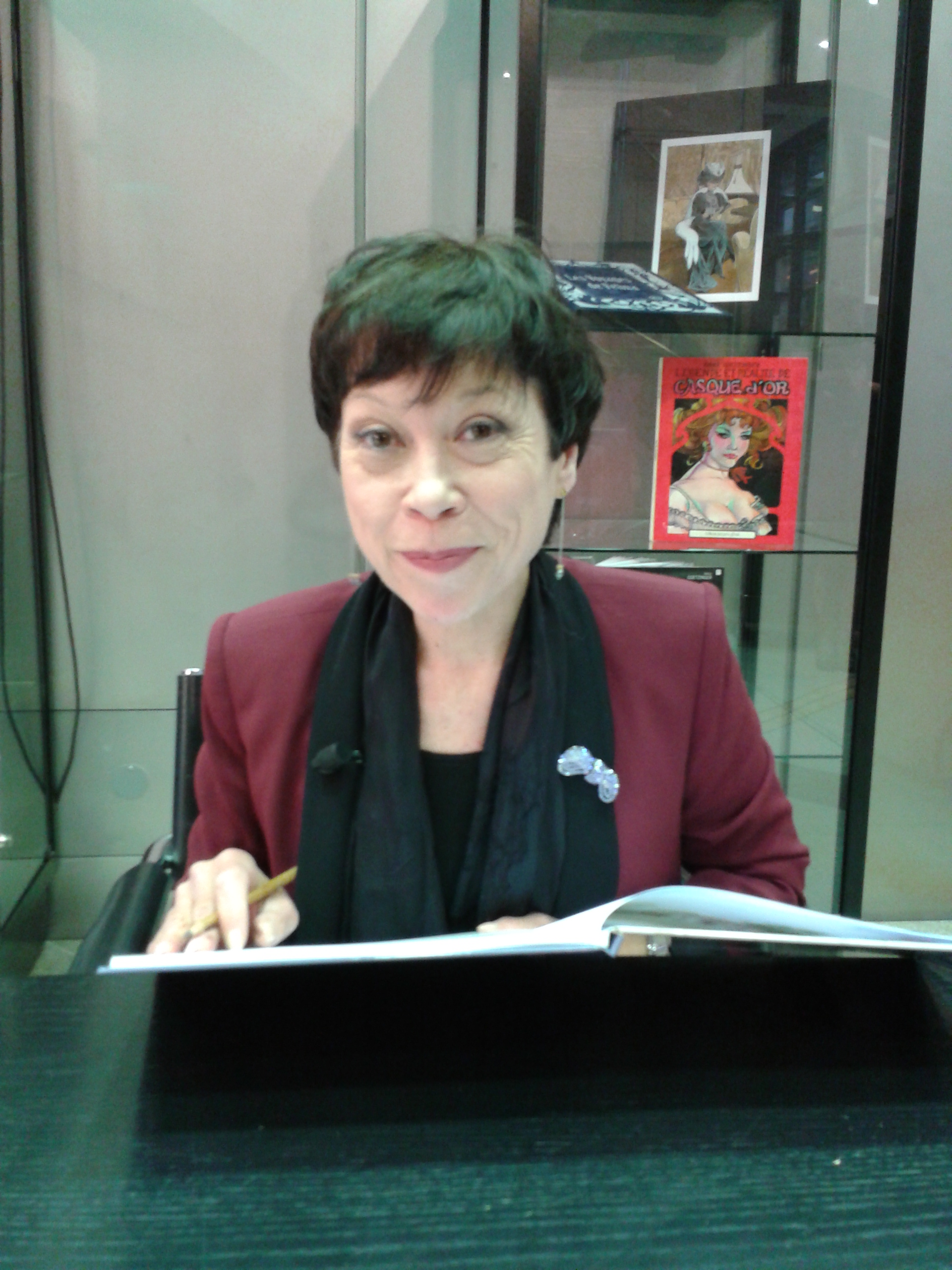
- Born: 18 August 1951; Paris, France
- Died: 20 December 2017 (aged 66)
- Occupations: Illustrator, author

Annie Goetzinger (18 August 1951 – 20 December 2017) was a comics artist and graphic novelist from Paris, France. From the mid-1970s until her death in 2017, she worked on award-winning graphic novels as well as press cartoons for newspapers such as La Croix and Le Monde. She had a long-standing relationship with comics publisher Dargaud and the comics writer Pierre Christin.

Graphically, Goetzinger is known for her research and attention to detail, carefully rendered apparel and a style influenced by Art Nouveau. Goetzinger's background in fashion drawing and costume design shows through in her work as well. In 2016, she was recruited to illustrate a recap of New York Fashion Week for New York Magazine.

Her earliest works were illustrations for short comic stories published in French comic magazines like Pilote, Charlie Mensuel and Fluide Glacial. Goetzinger's first graphic novel, Casque d'Or, won her two awards at the 1977 Angoulême International Comics Festival.

== Work ==
Many of her works include female protagonists and strong characters. For instance, Aurore, published in 1978 with story by Adela Turin, tells the story of the novelist best known by her pseudonym George Sand. Goetzinger's 2015 graphic novel Girl in Dior, the first of her works published in English, tells the story of a journalist named Clara who is reporting on Christian Dior's 1947 show.

In a 2015 interview, Goetzinger said, "When I started, I did not know there were so few girls making comics. ... I didn't care; I always felt like kind of a maverick."

=== Collaborations ===
In addition to writing the story and text for her own graphic novels, Goetzinger frequently collaborated with authors. She worked with French author Pierre Christin since the early 1980s and Spanish author Víctor Mora, among others.

== Death ==
Goetzinger died on 20 December 2017, at the age of 66.

== Bibliography ==
- Légende et réalité de Casque d'or, Glénat, 1976
- Aurore, éditions des femmes, 1978
- Curriculum BD, Les Humanoïdes Associés, 1980
- Portraits souvenirs series
  - La Demoiselle de la Légion d'Honneur, story by Pierre Christin, Dargaud, 1980
  - La Diva et le Kriegspiel, story by Pierre Cristin, Dargaud, 1981
  - La Voyageuse de petite ceinture, story by Pierre Christin, Dargaud, 1985
  - Charlotte et Nancy, story by Pierre Christin, Dargaud, 1987
  - Barcelonight, Les Humanoïdes Associés, 1990
  - Rayon Dames, Les Humanoïdes Associés, 1991
  - L'Avenir perdu, with Jon S. Jonsson and Andreas Knigge, Les Humanoïdes Associés, 1992
- Félina, story by Víctor Mora, Dargaud
  - Félina, 1982
  - Les mystères de Barcelone, 1983
  - L'Ogre du Djebel, 1986
- Le Tango du disparu, story by Pierre Christin, Flammarion, 1989
- Mémoires de Barcelone, text by Montserrat Roig, La Sirène, 1993
- Le Message du simple, story by Pierre Christin, Seuil, 1994
- La Sultane blanche, story by Pierre Christin, Dargaud, 1996
- Paquebot, story by Pierre Christin, Dargaud, 1999
- Agence Hardy series, story by Pierre Christin, Dargaud
  - Le parfum disparu, 2001
  - La Trace pâle, 2002
  - Le Poison rouge, 2004
  - Banlieue rouge, banlieue blanche, 2006
  - Berlin, zone française, 2008
  - Boulevard des crimes, 2009
  - Les diamants fondent au soleil, 2012
- Marie-Antoinette, la reine fantôme, story by Rodolphe, Dargaud, 2011
- Girl in Dior, Dargaud, 2013
- Les Apprentissages de Colette, Dargaud, 2017
