= Jean-Pierre Dionnet =

French comics writer

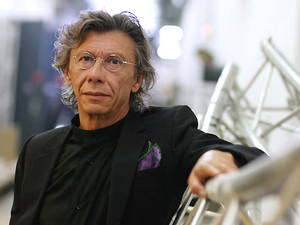
- Jean-Pierre Dionnet
- Born: 25 November 1947 (age 78); Paris, France
- Occupation: Comics writer

Jean-Pierre Dionnet (French: [djɔnɛ]; born 25 November 1947) is a French comics writer and TV presenter. He has also worked as an editor-in-chief (in Métal Hurlant), journalist, editor, film producer/distributor, and blogger.

He was the co-founder of the comics magazine Métal Hurlant in 1974. His works include Exterminateur 17, with art by Enki Bilal.

== Biography ==
Jean-Pierre Dionnet was born on 25 November 1947 in Paris, and at that time there was still rationing, so he spent the first five years in the Creuse. He fell behind in school and focused solely on his goal of working in comics. While pursuing his dream of becoming a comics writer, he worked as a broker on the weekend, and he was also a bookstore clerk in the first rendition of Futuropolis. In the year of 1968, Jean-Pierre Dionnet began working for Pilote where he wrote scripts for Jean Solé, Yves Got, Philippe Druillet, Moebius, Annie Goetzinger, and Enki Bilal.
