= Heavy Metal (magazine) =

American science fiction and fantasy comics magazine

- Jean-Michel Nicollet's cover for the first issue.
- Current Editors: RG Llarena (Head of Publishing & Editor-in-Chief); Chris Thompson (Senior Editor)
- Former editors: Sean Kelly (founding editor); Valerie Marchant (founding editor); Ted White (prose editor); Leonard Mogel (Editor-in-Chief); Julie Simmons-Lynch (Editor-in-Chief); Kevin Eastman (Editor-in-Chief); Dave Elliot (editor); Grant Morrison (Editor-in-Chief); Tim Seeley (Editor-in-Chief); Joseph Illidge (Executive Editor); Dave Kelly (Executive Editor); Frank Forte (Editor-in-Chief)
- Frequency: Monthly (1977–1985); Quarterly (1986–1989); Bi-Monthly (1989–2016); Quarterly (2017–2019)
- Circulation: 300,000 (mid-‘80s); 250,000 (mid-‘90s); 100,000 (mid-2010s); 30,000 (mid-2020s)
- Publisher: Matty Simmons (1977–1990); Kevin Eastman (1992–2020); David Erwin (2020–2022); Mathew Medney (2022–2023); Marshall Lees (2023–present)
- Founder: Leonard Mogel
- First issue: April 1977; 49 years ago
- Company: National Lampoon, Inc. (1977–1990); J2 Communications (1990–1992); Metal Mammoth, Inc. (1992–2014); Heavy Metal Media, LLC (2014–2021); Heavy Metal Entertainment, LLC (2021–2022); Massive Publishing (2023); Heavy Metal International, LLC (2024–present)
- Country: United States
- Language: English
- Website: HeavyMetal.com
- ISSN: 0885-7822

Heavy Metal is a long-running comics magazine, first published in the US in 1977, known for its blend of dark fantasy, science fiction, erotica, horror, and steampunk. Originally, its format and distribution to newsstands allowed it to feature sex and violence in ways not otherwise seen in traditional comic books.

The magazine started out primarily as an analog of the French magazine Métal hurlant, published by Les Humanoïdes Associés, marking for many in the Anglophone world their first introduction to the work of European cartoonists like Moebius, Druillet, Caza, Crepax, Enki Bilal, and Milo Manara.

Following a long period of turmoil and various corporation names, Heavy Metal Entertainment CEO Marshall Lees canceled the magazine in 2023 and laid off all its staff before relaunching the brand in 2025 under a new company, Heavy Metal International, with a new editorial team consisting of Frank Forte, Dave Kelly, and Chris Thompson supported by a small group of others working behind the scenes. However, by 2026, Kelly had quit, and Forte was no longer listed on the masthead by fall.

From the start, the relaunch-era of the company suffered fulfillment problems to retailers, subscribers, and kickstarter backers. The first issue was positively received.

== Publication History ==
=== National Lampoon (1977-1988) ===
After a 1975 European trip by National Lampoon contributor Tony Hendra expressing interest in European comics, the magazine's New York offices attracted significant European comic material. On 2 September 1976, editor Sean Kelly singled out the relatively new French comics anthology Métal hurlant (lit. 'Howling Metal', though Kelly translated it as "Screaming Metal") and brought it to the attention of company president Leonard Mogel on 3 September, as Mogel was departing for Germany and France to jump-start the French edition of National Lampoon. (Métal hurlant had debuted in early 1975 from Les Humanoïdes Associés (lit. 'United Humanoids'), an association of Moebius, Druillet, Jean-Pierre Dionnet, and financial director Bernard Farkas formed on 19 December 1974.) Upon Mogel's return from Paris on 27 September, he reported that the French publishers had agreed to an English language version, and he suggested the title Heavy Metal for an April issue to be released in March 1977.

Heavy Metal debuted in the US as a glossy, full-color monthly published by HM Communications, Inc., a subsidiary of Matty Simmons' Twenty First Century Communications, Inc. (Note: In late 1979, Twenty First Century Communications Inc. was renamed National Lampoon Inc.) The cover of the initial April 1977 issue declared itself to be "From the people who bring you the National Lampoon", and the issue primarily featured reprints from Métal hurlant, as well as material from National Lampoon, a colorized portion of Vaughn Bodē's Sunpot (1971), and an excerpt from Terry Brooks' The Sword of Shannara (1977). Since the color pages from Métal hurlant had already been shot in France, the budget to reproduce them in the US version was greatly reduced.

In the late spring of 1980, Métal hurlant went bankrupt and Heavy Metal severed its ties with its content partner. Métal hurlant managed to keep publishing, however, and the two magazines reconciled in the summer of 1981.

After running as a monthly for its first nine years up to the December 1985 issue, the magazine dropped to a quarterly schedule (winter, spring, summer, and fall) beginning in 1986, promising an increase in length and to feature only complete (rather than serialized) stories.

Métal hurlant folded in the summer of 1987, forcing Heavy Metal to expand its reach for new content.

=== Other HM Communications Publications ===
In 1977–1978, HM Communications published a number of trade paperbacks featuring "Heavy Metal Presents" on their covers, collecting translated material it had previously serialized in the pages of Heavy Metal:

- Arzach (1977) by Jean Giraud; originally published in Métal hurlant
- Candice at Sea (1977) by Jacques Lob and Georges Pichard (trans. by Sean Kelly and Valerie Marchant); originally published in Blanche Épiphanie #3—La Croisière infernale by Les Humanoïdes Associés in 1977
- Psychorock (1977) by Sergio Macedo (trans. by Kelly and Marchant); originally published by Les Humanoïdes Associés in 1976
- Barbarella: The Moon Child (1978) by Jean-Claude Forest (trans. by Richard Seaver); originally published in Barbarella #3 - Le Semble-Lune, published by Pierre Horay in 1977
- Ulysses (1978) adaptation of Homer's Odyssey by Jacques Lob and Georges Pichard; originally published by Dargaud in 1974–1975
- Is Man Good? (1978) by Jean Giraud (trans. by Sean Kelly and Valerie Marchant); originally published in Pilote and Métal hurlant
- Conquering Armies (1978) by Jean-Pierre Dionnet and Jean-Claude Gal (trans. by Sean Kelly and Valerie Marchant); originally published in Métal hurlant

In 1978–1979, HM Communications released a number of trade paperbacks of original content that had been serialized in the pages of Heavy Metal. These projects also featured "Heavy Metal Presents" on their covers:

- More Than Human (1979, in association with Simon & Schuster)—adaptation of the Theodore Sturgeon novel of the same name, by Doug Moench and Alex Niño; packaged by Byron Preiss Visual Publications
- 1941: The Illustrated Story (1979, in association with Arrow Books)—loose adaptation of the Steven Spielberg film of the same name, by Allen Asherman, Stephen R. Bissette, and Rick Veitch, with in introduction by Spielberg; varies wildly and humorously from the film.
- Alien: The Illustrated Story (1979, with distribution by Simon & Schuster)—adaptation of the Ridley Scott film of the same name, by Archie Goodwin and Walt Simonson
- Michael Moorcock's The Swords of Heaven, The Flowers of Hell (1979) by Michael Moorcock and Howard Chaykin
- So Beautiful and So Dangerous (1979, in association with Simon & Schuster) by Angus McKie
- New Tales of the Arabian Nights (1979) by Richard Corben and Jan Strnad, introduction by Harlan Ellison

In 1981, the company launched a new series, Heavy Metal Special Editions, which consisted of fifty seasonal Heavy Metal specials published until 2008. These began with Heavy Metal Presents Moebius (1981), followed by The Best of Heavy Metal (1982), Even Heavier Metal (1983), Son of Heavy Metal (1984), Bride of Heavy Metal (1985), and The Best of Heavy Metal 2 (1986). Beginning with The Venus Interface (1989, v5 no. 4), the indicia began to feature volume and issue numbers, as well as the phrase "a series of special editions published four times a year by Heavy Metal magazine." After the fiftieth issue, "Overload Special" (Summer 2008, v22 no. 2), the numbering of the seasonal specials was merged into the main series, and continued for another nine issues until the "War of the Worlds Special" (2011).

=== Grodnik, Matheson, and J2 Communications (1988-1992) ===
In late 1988/early 1989, film producer Daniel Grodnik and actor/producer Tim Matheson acquired voting control of 21.3 percent of National Lampoon Inc. stock, were named to the company's board, and eventually took control of the company (by purchasing the ten-percent share—worth $760,000—of Matty Simmons, who departed the company).

During this period, publication of Heavy Metal increased from a quarterly to a bi-monthly schedule, citing a thirty-percent increase in circulation.

A year later, Grodnik/Matheson Co. sold the properties to J2 Communications, a home video producer and distributor founded by James P. Jimirro, with Grodnik and Matheson staying on for a period to run the new division.

=== Kevin Eastman and Metal Mammoth, Inc. (1992-2014) ===
Kevin Eastman, co-creator of the Teenage Mutant Ninja Turtles, who had grown up reading Heavy Metal, bought the magazine for $500,000 in May 1992. (In total, HM Communications published 137 issues in 15 volumes from April 1977 to March 1992.) Eastman's publishing entity Metal Mammoth, Inc., published the magazine from 1992 to 2014. Eastman also served as Heavy Metal's editor-in-chief for the bulk of this time (even into 2016, after he was no longer the owner).

=== Post-Eastman Corporate Chaos (2014-2022) ===
In January 2014, Eastman sold the magazine to digital and music veteran David Boxenbaum and film producer Jeff Krelitz. Eastman continued to serve as publisher of the magazine (until early 2020) and was a minority investor in the new Heavy Metal, which became at that point published by Heavy Metal Media, LLC.

In late 2019, Krelitz was no longer with the magazine, which was undergoing leadership churn. In early 2020, Heavy Metal saw a regime change to CEO Matthew Medney and "Creative Overlord" David Erwin (formerly of DC Entertainment). Medney and Erwin announced two new comics publishing ventures, Virus and Magma Comix, though neither line produced much material.

Heavy Metal's 300th issue, published in 2021, featured work by Tanino Liberatore, Mark Bodé, and Kent Williams, among others; and posthumous work by Richard Corben, Moebius, and Vaughn Bodē. It had interviews and testimonials from writers discussing the impact the magazine had on them as teenagers.

In the fall of 2022, the magazine entered into an agreement with online marketplace Whatnot to publish the following 12 issues of the magazine. Soon afterward, the magazine announced it was "ceasing publication of what they described as the first volume of the magazine, which had been published continuously since 1977. The last issue of the first volume, number 320, was scheduled for publication in late October 2022 and the successor, Volume 2, would be published by WhatNot Publishing starting with issue 1 in February 2023."

Amid cash flow problems, however, Heavy Metal shut down in December 2022. Initially intended to be a temporary suspension, the magazine worked to rectify subscription non-fulfillments and non-payments to artists and vendors. Medney stepped down as CEO, replaced by Marshall Lees and Jamie Penrose.

=== Cancellation (2023) ===
In July 2023, with Whatnot's publishing division, Massive Publishing, only having produced one issue of Heavy Metal—#320, released in April of that year and still listing Heavy Metal Entertainment LLC in the indicia—it was announced that the publisher had decided to cancel the magazine and that #320 had been the final issue.

=== Relaunch (since 2024) ===
On October 15, 2024, Heavy Metal International, LLC announced that they would be relaunching the magazine in 2025 and began a Kickstarter crowdfunding campaign for the first issue on November 25, 2024. By 2026, a second Kickstarter had been completed, raising nearly $2 million in capital, but were fraught with fulfillment problems. As of October 2026, representatives from the company on social media channels as well as a customer service representative via email state that fulfillment was ongoing and to be resolved.

The first Kickstarter campaign was solely for the first issue, but it was offered in many variants as well as in hardcover and softcover. The campaign raised $782,989 pledged of $5,000 goal with 10,924 total backers. The campaign ran concurrently with a similar one for the English-language return of Métal Hurlant, which had been absent from the North American market for over twenty years. In the end, Heavy Metal had surpassed its French progenitor who had raised $759,111 pledged of a $5,000 goal with 5,098 total backers. Both campaigns began in November and ended in December 2024. However, as 2025 rolled along, problems regarding fulfilment started to emerge. In particular, campaign rewards appeared in retail outlets before backers had received them, running contrary to a promise made by the company during the campaign that backers would receive theirs first.

At the end of 2025, Heavy Metal launched a second kickstarter for a line of deluxe hardcover books. The titles offered were Druuna, Ranx, a.k.a. RanXerox, Segments, and a book compiling all of the magazine's covers called The Covers that Lead Us Here. While the campaign wildly successful in financial terms, raising $1,028,996 against a $10,000 goal with 6,048 backers, backers experienced a long wait time and little communication from the company.

== Artists and Features ==
=== Notable Artists and Features from the Classic Era ===
Heavy Metal's high-quality artwork was notable. Work by international fine artists such as H. R. Giger, Frank Frazetta, and Esteban Maroto were featured on the covers of various issues. Stefano Tamburini and Tanino Liberatore's RanXerox series debuted in the States. Terrance Lindall's illustrated version of Milton's epic poem Paradise Lost appeared in the magazine in 1980. Many stories were presented as long-running serials, such as those by Richard Corben, Pepe Moreno and Matt Howarth. Illustrators like Luis Royo and Alex Ebel contributed artwork over the course of their careers. An adaptation of the film Alien named Alien: The Illustrated Story, written by Archie Goodwin and drawn by Walter Simonson, was published in the magazine in 1979.

Here is a starting list of contributing artists featured in Heavy Metal:

- Neal Adams
- Enki Bilal
- Simon Bisley
- Brian Bolland
- Richard Corben
- Philippe Druillet
- Yacine Elghorri
- H. R. Giger
- Juan Giménez
- Moebius
- Milo Manara
- Esteban Maroto
- Paolo Eleuteri Serpieri
- Walt Simonson
- Jim Steranko
- Dave Stevens
- Arthur Suydam
- Barry Windsor-Smith
- Bernie Wrightson

=== Notable Artists and Features from the Relaunch Era ===
The issues plaguing the relaunch of Heavy Metal magazine skewed focus away from the content of the magazine. That said, the original material produced in this era has received positive notice from customers and retailers. They include:

- Gladiatrix by John Stanisci, Dan Gordon, David Baron, and Tom Nepolitano
- Heart & Sin by Dave Kelly, Brett Hobson, Katia Vecchio, Clare DeZutti, and DC Hopkins
- Millstone by Michael Conrad, Ilias Kyriazis, Nikki Spanou, and Simon Bowland
- Sixella by Janevsky

These titles were originally edited by Dave Kelly or Chris Thompson. Thompson assumed editing Gladiatrix with Issue 5, after Kelly quit at the end of 2025. Heart & Sin and Sixella left the HM portfolio with Kelly.

== Editors ==
=== Founding Editors ===
The founding editors of the American edition of Heavy Metal were Sean Kelly and Valerie Marchant. Over the life of the magazine, the two editors with the longest tenures were Julie Simmons-Lynch (who was publisher Matty Simmons' daughter) and Kevin Eastman, who was also the magazine's owner/publisher for more than 20 years.

The founding design director was Peter Kleinman (who served in the same capacity for National Lampoon). He created the original Heavy Metal logo design, at the request of Mogel, and was responsible for the launch and art direction of the first issue. Kleinman later hired designer and letterer John Workman, who brought to the magazine a background of experience at DC Comics and other publishers. Workman served as the magazine's art director from 1977 to 1984. (His comics art, writing, lettering, coloring, and design work are evident throughout issues from that period.)

Founding editors Kelly and Marchant were replaced in August 1979 by Ted White, who was hired to introduce non-fiction and prose fiction into the magazine. White was fired in August 1980, replaced as editor by magazine founder Leonard Mogel.

Julie Simmons-Lynch took over from Mogel in late 1981, serving as Heavy Metal's editor-in-chief for more than eleven years, stepping down when Kevin Eastman bought the magazine.

=== The Eastman Era to the 2010s ===
With a few breaks, Eastman was chief editor for Heavy Metal from early 1993 until mid-2016. Most of these breaks were packaged and edited by A1 co-creator Dave Elliott. Comics writer Grant Morrison became the magazine's editor-in-chief beginning with the April 2016 issue, serving through 2018. They later served as creative advisor.

=== 2020s to the Relaunch Era ===
By issue #298 (2020), Tim Seeley had become editor-in-chief but was out by the end of that year. In 2021, Joseph Illidge took over as Executive Editor but left the company entirely by the end of 2022.

Following the hiatus, all employees were let go and the company was dissolved. Heavy Metal International, LLC revived the brand in 2024 and subsequently announced new editors Frank Forte, Dave Kelly, and Chris Thompson would helm the magazine going forward. Dave Kelly quit at the end of 2025, and Frank Forte was off the masthead by the end of the year after taking a reduced role of Contributing Editor, while the title of EIC was handed to Head of Publishing RG Llarena and Chris Thompson became Senior Editor. This shakeup came following two financially-successful Kickstarter campaigns that suffered fulfilment problems, resulting in an outcry from customers on the Circle and Discord channels and in the comments section of the Kickstarter campaign.

== Legacy ==
Heavy Metal was widely credited for exposing many Americans/English-speakers to European comics and the continent's top cartoonists. As cartoonist and publisher Kevin Eastman said of the magazine, "Heavy Metal published European art that had not been previously seen in the United States, as well as demonstrating an underground comix sensibility that nonetheless wasn't as harsh or extreme as some of the underground comix – but ... definitely intended for an older readership".

Creators like George Lucas, Neil Gaiman, and Steven Lisberger have all discussed the influence of Heavy Metal on their later work.

The magazine was taken to task, however, for its juvenile stories, violence, and misogynist portrayals of women. Entertainment Weekly described the magazine as, "a legendary sci-fi and fantasy comic magazine for adults... and perhaps precocious teens interested in more daring material, or who consider Wonder Woman a tad underdressed." Critic R. M. Rhodes pointed out "the abundance of breasts in the magazine [was] somewhat of a running joke over the years."

Sheila Benson of the Los Angeles Times wrote that Heavy Metal had "charm" but decried its "sadism." Writing about the magazine's early years, Rhodes discussed the voluminous number of pieces in which "the amount of rape (and stories where attempted rape drives the action).... I really didn't keep track of how often it happens, but any number more than 'none' is usually a bad sign. Tragically, it's mostly used as just another plot point, with no mention or indication of the consequences."

== Film, TV, Streaming ==
=== Official Films ===
In 1981, an animated feature film was adapted from several of the magazine's serials. Made on a budget of U.S. $9.3 million and under production for three years, Heavy Metal features animated segments from several different animation houses, with each contributing a single story segment. Another house animated the frame story which ties all the disparate stories together. Another animated feature film called Heavy Metal 2000 was released in 2000.

=== Films Based on Material that Appeared in the Magazine ===
These films were not produced by Heavy Metal, but rather independently thereof.

- Immortal (based on Bilal's The Carnival of Immortals)
- War of the Worlds: Goliath (a sequel to H.G. Wells' War of the Worlds)

=== Films Inspired by the Magazine ===
These films take deep influence from material that appeared in the magazine but did not originate therein.

- Alien
- Blade Runner
- Dune
- The Fifth Element

=== Films Adapted into Comics ===
Several films were adapted into comics by Heavy Metal and appeared either in the magazine itself or as standalone books.

- Alien
- 1941
- Outland

=== Failed Projects that Led to Love, Death, & Robots and Rebel Moon ===
During 2008 and into 2009, reports circulated that David Fincher and James Cameron would executive produce and each direct two of the eight to nine segments of a new animated Heavy Metal feature. Kevin Eastman was to also direct a segment, as well as animator Tim Miller, Zack Snyder, Gore Verbinski and Guillermo del Toro. Paramount Pictures decided to stop funding the film by August 2009 and no distributor or production company has shown interest in the second sequel, since. In 2011, filmmaker Robert Rodriguez purchased the film rights to Heavy Metal and planned to develop a new animated film at the new Quick Draw Studios.

By March 2019, the David Fincher project had evolved into the well-known and well-received Netflix series Love, Death & Robots following a falling out with Heavy Metal management. The series was a rousing success for the streamer, bringing in 21 Primetime Emmy nominations, of which it won 17. Two episodes to date were taken from Fincher's original Heavy Metal movie pitch, "Snow in the Desert" and "400 Boys." Both won Emmys for the series: The former for Outstanding Sound Editing in 2021 and the latter for Outstanding Individual Achievement in Animation for Character Design and Outstanding Sound Editing in 2025. The latter was also nominated for 2D Animation Supervision.

By 2023, Zack Snyder had long moved on from any involvement with the Fincher/Cameron project and had gone down his own path of Heavy Metal-inspired world-building with his Rebel Moon series for Netflix. Promoting the films on the Joe Rogan Experience podcast, Snyder said, "Growing up I was obsessed with...Heavy Metal" and elabored on how the adult content of the magazine influenced his approach to Rebel Moon and how he had to compromise with Netflix to get his no-holds-barred director's cuts on the platform. It was also alleged by Rich Johnson of Bleeding Cool that, at some point in 2023, Snyder was in talks to buy Heavy Metal, but that never came to fruition. As with David Fincher and Love, Death, & Robots, the Rebel Moon films freely came to be as something inspired by Heavy Metal but not directly tied to the brand. Synder also said on the podcast that, "When you see the R-rated version of Rebel Moon, you're gonna be, like, fuck, this is, like, Heavy Metal come to life." Even the logo for Snyder's space opera series pays homage to the iconic Heavy Metal logo. Despite much hype and strong viewership initially, the prospects of a third movie remain in doubt. At TIFF 2026, Snyder was asked about Rebel Moon 3 and said, "[If the director's cuts] get a little bit more popular...then there’s a little bit more groundswell about maybe making another one."

=== Projects Announced that Never Materialized ===
Heavy Metal has a long history of announcing projects in other media that never come to fruition, such as Hoax Hunters, Roche Limit, and Interceptor all in 2015. Regardless, all were announced in legitimate Hollywood trade publications like Deadline and The Hollywood Reporter.

In the case of Fluorescent Black, a screenplay for a film written by Matt Wilson was optioned initially by Hong Kong-based animation studio Imagi, which had produced the successful fourth installment of the Teenage Mutant Ninja Turtles film series, TMNT. The screenplay was subsequently adapted into a comic drawn by Nathan Fox before going into production. The comics ran in three issues of Heavy Metal: vol. 32 #6 (September 2008); vol. 33 #6 (September 2009); and vol. 34 #6 (September 2010). However, after the failure of Imagi's feature-length reboot of Astro Boy, the company folded and the film never came to be.

In March 2021, Heavy Metal announced it would be adapting Blake Northcott's Arena Mode Saga for television, but, after years of corporate-level turbulence, the project remains motionless. Also announced around that time was a slate of content dubbed The Metalverse, of which the Arena Mode Saga seemed to be a part. However, following an alleged corporate sale and the departure of the company's Head of Studio Tommy Coriale, the likelihood of this slate materializing is in doubt.

=== Taarna ===
The most recent comic book iteration of Taarna is derived from a TV series pitch from Aaron Guzikowski that was trapped in development hell for many years at Ridley Scott's Scott Free Productions and AppleTV. The project reverted back to Heavy Metal and became a comic instead. It's being drawn by Andy Belanger and colored by Tatto Caballero and co-edited by Senior Editor Chris Thompson and Heavy Metal's Chief Content Officer Lia Bozonelis. YouTuber Tennessee Fats, who has covered Heavy Metal's relaunch era extensively, has called this iteration of the character "dumbed down," "the biggest hurt to Heavy Metal's brand," and "a critical mistake."

=== Future Plans ===
As of 2026, there have been no further developments on any film projects.

== Other Media ==
=== Video Games ===
Heavy Metal 2000 inspired a video game sequel released in 2000, the PC action-adventure Heavy Metal: F.A.K.K.². It was developed by Ritual Entertainment.

In 2001, Capcom released Heavy Metal: Geomatrix, an arcade fighting game that later made its way to Sega's Dreamcast console. Though not based on any specific material from Heavy Metal, it featured character designs by frequent contributor Simon Bisley and a style generally inspired by the magazine.

=== Pinball Machine ===
In late 2020, Stern Pinball and the production company Incendium released a pinball machine commemorating the 300th issue of Heavy Metal, featuring Taarna and Cold Dead War (2021). Designed by George Gomez, the machine was made to order, with a playfield based on their 2019 Star Wars release, and was given an eight-thousand dollar price tag. An exclusive variant cover of Heavy Metal issue #300 was purported to be included with it. Pinside, a website devoted to pinball machine culture, disclosed that, ultimately, "only 100 Stern Heavy Metal Pinball Machines of the 300 scheduled to be produced were ever made. No matching numbered magazine issues were ever issued, Incendium was shipped the blank cover variant of issue 300 and decided not to use them."

=== Podcast Network ===
In 2021, Heavy Metal launched a podcast network featuring scripted and unscripted shows that focused on horror, fantasy, sci-fi, comedy, and pop culture. The podcast ran for only one season of 20 episodes. The podcast is not currently archived on the Heavy Metal website.

== See also ==
- Airtight Garage
- Den (comics)
- RanXerox
- Epic Illustrated
- Eclipse magazine
- Raw magazine

== Sources ==
- Heavy Metal at the Grand Comics Database
