= Philippe Druillet =

French comics author (born 1944)

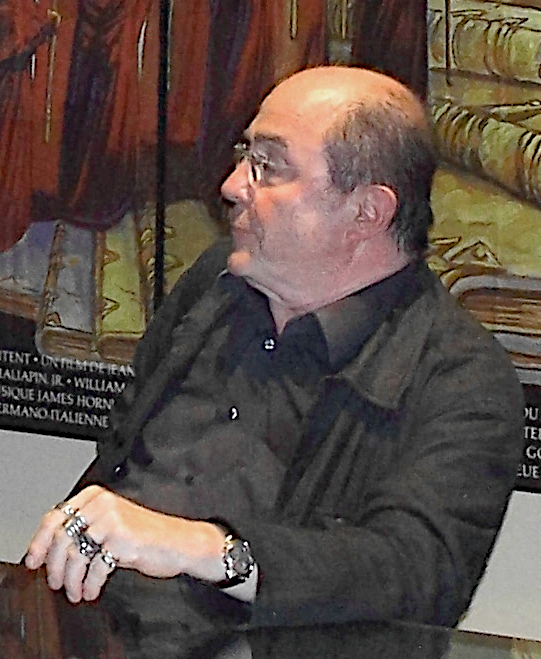
- Philippe Druillet at Babel International Comics Festival, Athens, June 2007
- Born: 28 June 1944 (age 82) Toulouse, France
- Areas: Writer, Penciller, Inker, Colourist
- Notable works: Lone Sloane saga; Yragaël; La Nuit; Salammbô; Nosferatu
- Awards: full list

Philippe Druillet (French: [dʁɥijɛ]; born 28 June 1944) is a French comics artist and creator, and an innovator in visual design.

== Biography ==
Philippe Druillet was born in Toulouse, Haute-Garonne, France, but spent his youth in Spain, returning to France in 1952 after the death of his father. A science fiction and comics fan, Druillet worked as a photographer after graduating from high school, drawing only for his own pleasure.

His first published series was his version of Michael Moorcock's Elric stories in a short-lived magazine. His first book, Le Mystère des abîmes (The Mystery of the Abyss), appeared in 1966. It introduced his recurring hero Lone Sloane and played on science-fiction themes partially inspired by his favourite writers, H. P. Lovecraft and A.E. van Vogt. Later, Druillet created book covers for new editions of Lovecraft's work, as well as numerous movie posters.

After Druillet became a regular contributor to the Franco-Belgian comics magazine Pilote in 1970, his Lone Sloane saga grew steadily more flamboyant as he pursued innovative new imagery, including bold page designs and computer-generated images. His backdrops of gigantic structures inspired by Art Nouveau, indigenous architecture, and Gothic cathedrals earned him the nickname of "space architect". Six tales about Sloane's exploits were collected in Les six voyages de Lone Sloane in 1972, hailed by many as his masterpiece, and Sloane was again the hero of the graphic novel Délirius (1973), written by Jacques Lob. In 1973, Druillet also produced the Moorcock's Elric-inspired Yragaël for Pilote, and Vuzz for the magazine Phénix.

In 1975, Druillet joined Jean-Pierre Dionnet, Bernard Farkas, and Moebius to form the publishing house Les Humanoïdes Associés and the magazine Métal Hurlant. This was to be a vehicle for his finest stories, and showcased a steady evolution in his graphical skills. His series Lone Sloane and Vuzz continued, and other stories of this period include La Nuit, and Nosferatu. In 1980, Druillet produced Salammbô, a comic book trilogy based upon Flaubert's proto–heroic fantasy novel Salammbô.

Outside his work as a cartoonist and illustrator, Druillet has also been active in architecture, rock opera, painting, sculpture, and digital art. He worked as a designer on the film Sorcerer, directed by William Friedkin in 1976. He collaborated on Rolf Liebermann's Wagner Space Opera in the Opera de Paris in the late 1970s to early 1980s, and founded the Space Art Création in 1984. In 1987, Druillet worked on the film "Kazhann", a feature-length film featuring his iconic character Lone Sloane, however this project, which was produced by Xavier Gélin and had a script co-written by Druillet and author Benjamin Legrand, was cancelled, as Gélin died of brain cancer during production. More recently, he created the artwork and designed large parts of the background of the 2005 TV miniseries remake Les Rois maudits (The Accursed Kings).

== Awards ==
- 1972: European SF award for Comics for Lone Sloane at the first Eurocon in Trieste, Italy
- 1976: Grand Prix de la Science Fiction Française, Special Prize for Urm le Fou
- 1988: Grand Prix de la ville d'Angoulême (lifetime achievement award), at the Angoulême International Comics Festival, France
- 1990: ESFS Hall of Fame (best artist) at the 1990 Eurocon in Fayence, France
- 1996: Grand Prix National des Arts Graphiques, France

== Works ==
- Lone Sloane:
  - Le mystère des abîmes (1966, republished as Lone Sloane 66, 1982, Les Humanoïdes Associés, ISBN 2-902123-12-3 )
  - Les six voyages de Lone Sloane (1972, Dargaud, ISBN 2-205-00632-0)
  - Délirius (1973, with Jacques Lob, Dargaud, ISBN 2-205-00663-0)
  - Chaos (2000, Albin Michel, ISBN 2-226-10934-X)
- Firaz et la ville fleur / City of Flowers (with Picotto (art), 1974 in Heavy Metal, 1980, Dargaud, ISBN 2-205-01678-4)
- Yragaël (1974, with Michel Demuth, Dargaud, ISBN 2-205-00829-3)
- Vuzz (1974, Dargaud, republished 1981, Les Humanoïdes Associés, ISBN 2-7316-0090-1 )
- Urm le fou / Urm the Mad (1975, Dargaud, ISBN 2-205-00913-3)
- Mirages (1976, Les Humanoïdes Associés, ISBN 2-7316-0038-1)
- La nuit (1976, Les Humanoïdes Associés, ISBN 2-902123-06-X)
- Gail (1978, self-published, republished 1982, Les Humanoïdes Associés, ISBN 2-7316-0146-9)
- Salammbô:
  - Salammbô (1980, Les Humanoïdes Associés, ISBN 2-7316-0065-9)
  - Carthage (1982, Dargaud, ISBN 2-205-02253-9)
  - Matho (1986, Dargaud, ISBN 2-205-02744-1)
- Nosferatu (1989, Dargaud, ISBN 2-205-03763-3)
