= Enki Bilal =

French comic book creator and film director (born 1951)

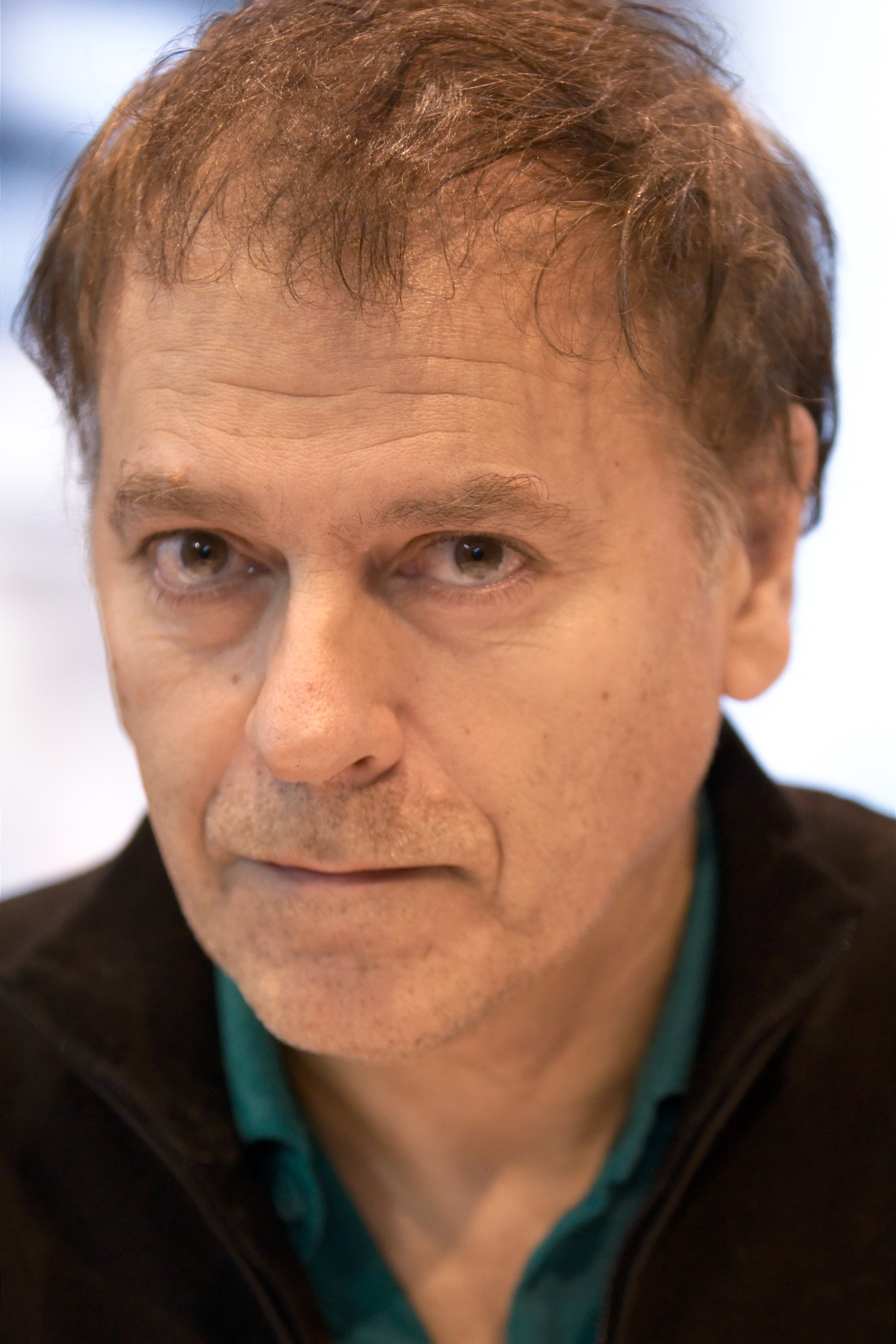
- Enki Bilal in October 2017
- Born: Enes Bilal; 7 October 1951 (age 75) Belgrade, PR Serbia, SFR Yugoslavia
- Areas: Artist, writer, director
- Notable works: Nikopol Trilogy, Légendes d'Aujourd'hui, Partie de chasse
- Awards: Full list

Enki Bilal (born Enes Bilal; born 7 October 1951) is a French comic book creator and film director.

== Biography ==
=== Early life ===
Bilal was born in Belgrade, PR Serbia, SFR Yugoslavia, to a Czech mother, Ana, who came to Belgrade as child from Karlovy Vary, and a Bosnian Muslim father, Muhamed Hamo Bilal, from Ljubuški, who had been Josip Broz Tito's tailor. When he was five years old, his father managed to take a trip and stay in Paris as a political émigré. Enki and the rest of the family, his mother Ana and sister Enisa, stayed in Yugoslavia, and four years later they followed. Enki Bilal has no sense of belonging to any ethnic group and religion, nor is he obsessed with soil and roots. He said in one interview: "I also feel Bosnian by my father's origin, a Serb by my place of birth and a Croat by my relationship with a certain one to my childhood friends, not to mention my other Czech half, who I am inherited from mother".

=== Education and career ===
At age 14, he met René Goscinny and with his encouragement applied his talent to comics. He produced work for Goscinny's Franco-Belgian comics magazine Pilote in the 1970s, publishing his first story, Le Bol Maudit, in 1972.

In 1975, Bilal began working with script writer Pierre Christin on a series of dark and surreal tales, resulting in the body of work titled Légendes d'Aujourd'hui.

In 1983, Bilal was asked by film director Alain Resnais to collaborate on his film La vie est un roman, for which Bilal provided painted images that were incorporated in the "medieval" episodes of the film.

He is best known for the Nikopol trilogy (La Foire aux immortels, La Femme piège and Froid Équateur), which took more than a decade to complete. Bilal wrote the script and did the artwork. The final chapter, Froid Équateur, was chosen book of the year by the magazine Lire and is acknowledged by the inventor of chess boxing, Iepe Rubingh, as the inspiration for the sport.

Quatre? (2007), the last book in the Hatzfeld tetralogy, deals with the breakup of Yugoslavia from a future viewpoint. The first installment came in 1998 in the shape of Le Sommeil du Monstre opening with the main character, Nike, remembering the war in a series of traumatic flashbacks. The third chapter of the tetralogy is Rendez-vous à Paris (2006), which was the fifth best selling new comic of 2006, with 280,000 copies sold.

His cinematic career was revived with the expensive Immortel, his first attempt to adapt his books to the screen. The film faced divided reception. The use of CGI was considered visually inventive but still uneven. While stylistically bold and ambitious, critics noted that film suffered in coherence.

On 13 May 2008 a video game based on the Nikopol trilogy was announced titled Nikopol: Secrets of the Immortals. Published in North America by Got Game Entertainment in August 2008, the game is a "point and click" adventure for the PC; however, the Lead Designer was Marc Rutschlé and not Bilal himself, who was the art designer, along with Yoshitaka Amano, for the video game Beyond Good and Evil 2.

In 2012, Bilal was featured in a solo exhibition at The Louvre. The exhibition, titled "The Ghosts of the Louvre", ran from 20 December 2012 to 18 March 2013. The exhibition was organized by Fabrice Douar, and featured a series of paintings of "Ghosts", done atop photographs that Bilal took of the Louvre's collection.

== Awards ==
- 1980: Prix RTL – for best adult comic
- 1987: Angoulême Festival, France, Grand Prix de la ville d'Angoulême
- 1993: Best book of the year Award from Lire magazine
- 1997: Brussels International Festival of Fantasy Film, Special Mention
- 1999: Adamson Award, Sweden, for Best International Comic Book Cartoonist
- 1999: Angoulême Festival, Nominated for Best comic book
- 2004: Angoulême Festival, Nominated for Audience award
- 2004: Fantasia Ubisoft Festival, Gold medal for Best Groundbreaking Film, Bronze Medal for Best International Film (public prizes)
- 2006: International Horror Guild Award, Best Illustrated Narrative, for Memories

== Bibliography ==
=== Légendes d'Aujourd'hui ===
(written by Pierre Christin)

- La Croisière des oubliés (1975, Dargaud; The Cruise of Lost Souls, also translated as The Voyage Of Those Forgotten)
- Le Vaisseau de pierre (1976, Dargaud; Ship of Stone, also translated as Progress!)
- La ville qui n'existait pas (1977, Dargaud; The Town That Didn't Exist, also translated as The City That Didn't Exist)

=== Fins de Siècle ===
(written by Pierre Christin)

- Les Phalanges de l'ordre noir (1979, Dargaud; The Black Order Brigade)
- Partie de chasse (1983, Dargaud; The Hunting Party)

=== Nikopol ===
- La Foire aux immortels (1980, Dargaud; The Carnival of Immortals)
- La Femme piège (1986, Dargaud; The Woman Trap)
- Froid Équateur (1992, Les Humanoïdes Associés; Cold Equator)

=== Monstre ===
- Le Sommeil du monstre (1998, Les Humanoïdes Associés; The Dormant Beast)
- 32 Décembre (2003, Les Humanoïdes Associés; December 32)
- Rendez-vous à Paris (2006, Casterman; Rendezvous in Paris)
- Quatre? (2007, Casterman; Four?)

=== Coup de Sang ===
- Animal'Z (2009, Casterman)
- Julia & Roem (2011, Casterman)
- La Couleur de l'Air (2014, Casterman)

=== Bug ===
- “Tome 1” (2017, Casterman)
- “Tome 2” (2019, Casterman)
- “Tome 3” (2022, Casterman)
- “Tome 4” (2025, Casterman)

=== Other ===
- Mémoires d'outre-espace, Histoires courtes 1974–1977 (Memories From Outer Space, 1978)
- Exterminateur 17 (Exterminator 17, 1979; written by Jean-Pierre Dionnet)
- Los Angeles – L'Étoile oubliée de Laurie Bloom (Los Angeles – The Forgotten Star of Laurie Bloom, 1984)
- Hors Jeu (Off Play, 1987; with Patrick Cauvin)
- Coeurs sanglants et autres faits divers (Bleeding Hearts and Other Stories, 1988; written by Pierre Christin)
- Bleu Sang (Blue Blood, 1994)
- Mémoires d'autre temps, Histoires courtes 1971–1981 (Memories From Other Times, 1996)
- EnkiBilalAnDeuxMilleUn (EnkiBilalInTwoThousandOne, 1996)
- Tykho Moon – livre d'un film (Tykho Moon – Book of a Film, 1996)
- Un Siècle d'Amour (A century of Love , 1999)
- Le Sarcophage (The Sarcophagus, 2000)
- Magma (2000)
- Les Fantômes du Louvre (2012)

=== English translations ===
==== Comics in Heavy Metal Magazine ====
From its start through the 1980s, Bilal was a frequent contributor to the American Heavy Metal magazine. Many notable Bilal comics made their English debut in this period of the magazine. Although shorter stories appeared later in the '90s, Heavy Metal readers had to wait until 2012 for another graphic novel feature from Bilal.

Graphic novels

English title	Date (start)	Issue (start)	Date (end)	Issue (end)	Writer	Number of pages
Exterminator 17	1978/10	Vol. 2 No. 6	1979/03	Vol. 2 No. 11	Jean-Pierre Dionnet	60
Progress!	1980/07	Vol. 4 No. 4	1980/11	Vol. 4 No. 8	Pierre Christin	54
The Nikopol Trilogy: The Immortals' Fete	1981/05	Vol. 5 No. 2	1981/12	Vol. 5 No. 9	Enki Bilal	62
The Voyage of Those Forgotten	1982/04	Vol. 6 No. 1	1982/11	Vol. 6 No. 8	Pierre Christin	52
The City That Didn't Exist	1983/03	Vol. 6 No. 12	1983/09	Vol. 7 No. 6	Pierre Christin	54
The Hunting Party	1984/06	Vol. 8 No. 3	1985/03	Vol. 8 No. 12	Pierre Christin	82
The Nikopol Trilogy: The Trapped Woman	1986/Fall	Vol. 10 No. 3	same as start		Enki Bilal	54
Animal'z	2012/03	March 2012	2014/04	270	Enki Bilal	87

Short stories

English title	Date	Issue	Note	Number of pages
"Crossroads of the Universe"	1977/07	Vol. 1 No. 4	reprinted in Greatest Hits 1994	7
"The Death of Orlaon, or: Legendary Immortality"	1978/07	Vol. 2 No. 3	reprinted in The Best of 1982	4
"Ultimate Negotiations"	1979/01	Vol. 2 No. 9		4
"True Tales of Outer Space: The Planet of no Return"	1979/02	Vol. 2 No. 10		7
"Going Native"	1979/04	Vol. 2 No. 12		7
"The Road to Ruin"	1980/02	Vol. 3 No. 10	written by Pierre De La Varech	2
"Of Needle and Thread"	1980/04	Vol. 4 No. 1	reprinted in hardcover version of Greatest Hits 1994	4
"Only the Plitch"	1980/05	Vol. 4 No. 2	reprinted in The Best of No. 2 1986	10
"Amusing Stories Section: A Day in the Log of the City of Alger"	1982/08	Vol. 6 No. 5	written by Jean-Pierre Dionnet	4
"Enki Bilal Enters the World of Hardcore Science Fiction"	1983/10	Vol. 7 No. 7	Art gallery	7
"The Gray Man"	1984/09	Vol. 9 No. 6	reprinted in Greatest Hits 1994	1
"Over the Wall"	1984	Son of Heavy Metal		4
"The Leader's Surprise"	1997/07	Vol. 21 No. 3		4
"Mondovision"	1997/11	Vol. 21 No. 5		4
"Close the Shutters and Open Your Eyes"	1997	Horror Special – Vol. 11 No 1		10
"On the Wing"	1997/Fall	20 Years of Heavy Metal – Vol. 11 No. 2		7
"New York, 2000 AD."	1998/01	Vol. 21 No. 6		4
"The Slow Boat to Vega"	1998/03	Vol. 22 No. 1		4

==== Comic Book Albums ====
Since the late seventies, it were publishers NBM, Catalan Communications, Humanoids Publishing, and Titan Comics that have released several albums by Bilal.

===== NBM =====
- The Call of the Stars (March 1979. Flying Buttress Publications ISBN 0-918348-02-1, ISBN 978-0-918348-02-9)

A collection of short stories.

- The Phantoms of the Louvre (June 2014. NBM Publishing. ISBN 1-56163-841-2, ISBN 978-1561638413)

===== Catalan Communications (NY publishing house) =====
Paperback books

- Exterminator 17 (June 1986. 60 pages ISBN 0-87416-024-3, ISBN 978-0-87416-024-6)
- Gods in Chaos: A Graphic Novel (February 1988. ISBN 0-87416-049-9, ISBN 978-0-87416-049-9) – First installment of the Nikopol Trilogy
- The Woman Trap (May 1988. ISBN 0-87416-050-2, ISBN 978-0-87416-050-5) – Second installment of the Nikopol Trilogy
- The Town That Didn't Exist (February 1989. 56 pages. ISBN 0-87416-051-0, ISBN 978-0-87416-051-2) - First installment of Légendes d'Aujourd'hui
- The Ranks of the Black Order (June 1989. 80 pages. ISBN 0-87416-052-9, ISBN 978-0874160529) - Second installment of Légendes d'Aujourd'hui
- The Hunting Party (March 1990. ISBN 0-87416-053-7) - Third installment of Légendes d'Aujourd'hui
- Outer States (July 1990. ISBN 0-87416-085-5, ISBN 978-0-87416-085-7)

===== Humanoids Publishing =====
Hardcover, large format books

- The Nikopol Trilogy (February 2000. 176 pages. ISBN 0-9672401-2-3)
- The Black Order Brigade (May 2000. 88 pages, hardcover. ISBN 0-9672401-8-2, ISBN 978-0-9672401-8-3)
- Ship of stone (2001. ISBN 1-930652-39-9, ISBN 978-1-930652-39-2)
- The Cruise of Lost Souls (2001. 56 pages ISBN 1-930652-38-0, ISBN 978-1-930652-38-5)
- The Hunting Party (March 2002. 100 pages. ISBN 0-9672401-7-4)
- Memories From Outer Space (April 2002. 52 pages. ISBN 1-930652-26-7)
- Exterminator 17 (June 2002. 66 pages. ISBN 1-930652-50-X)
- The Dormant Beast (5 October 2002. 72 pages. ISBN 1-930652-83-6, ISBN 978-1-930652-83-5)
- The Town That Didn't Exist (March 2003. 56 pages, Hardcover. ISBN 1-930652-37-2, ISBN 978-1-930652-37-8)

The Bilal Library: (small format – 190 × 260 cm – paperbacks)

- Townscapes (1 July 2004. 176 pages. ISBN 1-4012-0361-2)
- The Beast Trilogy: Chapters 1& 2 (29 September 2004. 128 pages. ISBN 1-4012-0398-1)
- The Nikopol Trilogy (10 November 2004. 176 pages ISBN 1-4012-0384-1)
- The Chaos Effect (19 January 2005. 168 pages) Containing The Black Order Brigade and The Hunting Party
- Memories (20 April 2005. 144 pages. ISBN 1-4012-0380-9) Contains Memories of Outer Space and Memories of Outer Times

Trade Paperback:

- The Dormant Beast (March 2000. 72 pages. ISBN 0-9672401-5-8)

===== Titan Comics =====
Hardcover, large format books

- The Nikopol Trilogy (April 2016. 184 pages. ISBN 9781782763536)
- Century's End (November 2016. 184 pages. ISBN 9781785868740)
- Exterminator 17 (November 2018. 240 pages. ISBN 9781785867330)
- Monster (September 2019. 264 pages. ISBN 9781785868733)
- Legends of Today (February 2021. 176 pages. ISBN 9781785868740)

== Filmography ==
Year	Title	Director	Writer
1989	Bunker Palace Hôtel	Yes	Yes
1996	Tykho Moon	Yes	Yes
2004	Immortel, ad vitam	Yes	Yes

== Sources ==
- Bilal publications in Pilote, Metal Hurlant, (A SUIVRE) BDoubliées (in French)
- Enki Bilal at Bedetheque (in French)
- Enki Bilal at the Grand Comics Database
- Enki Bilal at the Comic Book DB (archived from the original)
