= Les Humanoïdes Associés =

Franco-American publishing house specializing in comics and graphic novels

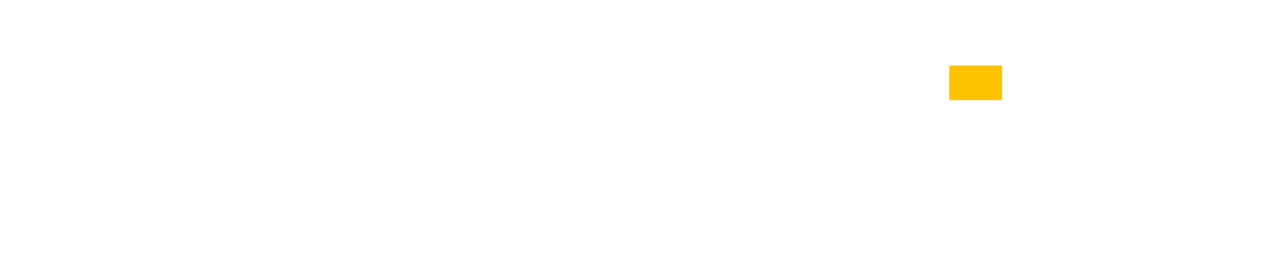
- Founded: December 1974
- Founder: Jean-Pierre Dionnet; Philippe Druillet; Moebius; Bernard Farkas
- Country of origin: France
- Headquarters location: Paris, France (1974–2013); Los Angeles, California, U.S. (2013–present)
- Distribution: Diamond Comic Distributors, Simon & Schuster (U.S. and UK); Turnaround Publisher Services (UK)
- Publication types: Comics and graphic novels
- Official website: www.humano.com (French) www.humanoids.com (English)

Les Humanoïdes Associés (Note: French: [le ymanɔid asɔsje]) (or Humanoids) is a French-American publishing house specializing in comics and graphic novels, founded in December 1974 by comic artists Mœbius, Jean-Pierre Dionnet, Philippe Druillet, and financial director Bernard Farkas.

Its initial goal was to publish the magazine Métal hurlant, which focused on science fiction. It later expanded to include works from other comic book genres.

Considered revolutionary in the comic book form at the time, chiefly due to its focus on the science fiction genre, the work found in Humanoïdes inspired many generations of authors and filmmakers.

Present in various countries, Humanoids underwent restructuring in summer 2025, and two of its subsidiaries, Humanoids, Inc. and Humanoids Corp., entered Chapter 7 proceedings. Its backlist and new releases, including the quarterly anthology Métal hurlant, continue to be published in English and French.

== History ==
=== Métal Hurlant and early works ===
In December 1974, critic and scriptwriter Jean-Pierre Dionnet, writer-artists Philippe Druillet and Mœbius, along with businessman Bernard Farkas, decided to create Les Humanoïdes Associés in order to publish a quarterly science-fiction magazine. The first issue of Métal hurlant was published in January 1975, with Jean-Pierre Dionnet as editor.

The magazine mainly published science fiction and fantasy works, but Dionnet prized diversity and published works by Chantal Montellier as well as those by Philippe Druillet. Dionnet also endeavored to publish foreign authors—the first issue showcased American artist Richard Corben, the second issue featured fellow American Vaughn Bodé, along with Brazilian Sergio Macedo, Swiss Daniel Ceppi, Dutchman Joost Swarte, etc.

As early as 1975, two graphic novels were published: Jason Muller, by Claude Auclair, and Rolf, by Richard Corben. An increasing number of graphic novels were published in the following years (10 in 1976, 15 in 1977, 17 in 1978, 28 in 1979, 38 in 1980, etc.). The titles were mostly by authors that featured in the magazine, such as Druillet, Mœbius (Arzach was published in 1976), Jacques Tardi, etc. Nevertheless, Humanoïdes also published other authors, such as Italian Hugo Pratt, as well as the American classics Conan the Barbarian, Spirit, Nick Fury, and British classic Dan Dare. Humanoïdes also published a handful of risqué works, such as John Willie's erotic Gwendoline. In 1977, Humanoïdes published their first compendium of images with H. R. Giger's Necronomicon.

Humanoïdes' publishing enabled it to gain a considerable financial grounding, which proved to be useful when confronted with a number of management mishaps (exorbitant loan rates, high production costs, non-payment of dues, etc.). It also led to a number of landmark imprints, such as Xanadu, which featured large-scale American comics (nine volumes between 1983 and 1985), and Autodafé, which published comics in novel form. Autodafé (six volumes were published in 1982–1983) was the first manga to be distributed in French bookshops.

From 1976 to 1978, Humanoïdes published a second magazine, Ah! Nana, a project managed by women. Its editors (Janic Guillerez, with early input from Anne Delobel) and principal contributors were almost all women. This innovative project, especially given the male-influenced milieu in which it took place, was nevertheless hampered by chronically poor sales and its adult-only material. In May 1977, Ciné Fantastic was published, but the magazine folded after a single issue. Several years later, Dionnet noticed an increase in the number of titles available in bookshops, and sought to increase the reach of Les Humanoïdes Associés. The magazines Métal (hurlant) Aventure, with a focus on adventure, and Rigolo!, with a comedic focus, were both launched in 1983, but were only published until 1984 and 1985, respectively.

In 1977, Métal hurlant gained worldwide attention when it was translated into English and distributed in North America and the Commonwealth countries under the name Heavy Metal. Heavy Metal featured mainly European authors near the beginning of its publication, but increasingly relied on American authors as time went on. Nevertheless, it introduced European comics to the North American market, where artists such as Mœbius began to be noticed. By the end of the 1980s, Heavy Metal became completely independent from Les Humanoïdes Associés. As of 2020, it is still being published.

This mix of financial successes and failures led to a difficult situation for the publishing house. In April 1980, the company's ownership was divided between a Spanish printing company (a major creditor) and a number of private shareholders, principally people who had been associated with the beginnings of the company (such as Druillet, Mœbius, Margerin, and Gillon).

==== Renewal ====
In 1988, the publishing house and its catalogue (including Métal hurlant) were purchased by 23-year-old Swiss publisher/producer Fabrice Giger, who turned it into an intellectual property development company. In less than two decades, the company developed one of the most respected graphic novel/comic book catalogues in the world, featuring authors such as Moebius, Alexandro Jodorowsky, Enki Bilal, Milo Manara, and Juan Gimenez, and books from multiple genres, all intended for mature readers. The success led Giger to abandon his own original publishing house Alpen Publishers (founded in 1988 for traditional comics publications aimed at an all-ages readership) in 1994 after unsuccessful efforts to integrate its disparate catalogue into that of Humanoïdes, instead focusing all his energy on Humanoïdes.

A number of additional crises (including a narrowly averted 1993-1995 hostile takeover attempt by Parisian publisher Hachette, considered by Giger as Humanoïdes' darkest hour), led Humanoïdes to be put into administration, which it exited after 18 months in late 2009. Since then, the company has enjoyed renewed success with a number of new series, such as Crusades, La Légende des nuées écarlates, Les Épées de verre, Carthago, and Le Manoir des murmures.

Humanoïdes have also tried their hand at European manga, such as Omega and B.B. Project. These titles were published in the traditional manga format, but Humanoïdes has also experimented with manga-type publications in a more European style. The Ecube series is an example of this mixed genre, written by Iovinelli and illustrated by Dall Oglio. Crusades, another example of this blended style, has European authors but a Chinese illustrator.

=== Humanoids Publishing ===
Humanoids Publishing, Inc. (or simply Humanoids) was founded in the United States in 1999 by Giger, eleven years after his acquisition of the French parent company, with the aim to publish French cult classics as well as recruit American talent. A number of successful French works were published, including Bouncer, Metabarons, Technopriests, The White Lama, The Incal, The Nikopol Trilogy, and others. In 2002, Humanoids began publishing an English-language version of the new Métal Hurlant (not to be confused with the then still running Heavy Metal magazine), which would only last two years.

In January 2004, Humanoids signed an agreement with DC Comics aimed at integrating the Humanoids publications into the DC Comics catalog. This agreement enabled Humanoids to gain greater visibility on the market, while DC Comics obtained the distribution rights for the English-language versions of Humanoids' works. Certain works published since 1998 were reprinted, while new titles were also translated into English (El Niño, Megalex, Basil and Victoria, etc.). However, the books were expensive and success was limited, leading DC Comics to announce the end of the agreement in April 2005.

In 2007, an agreement was signed with Image Comics to publish Lucha Libre in North America. In July 2008, Humanoids began a partnership with Devil's Due to publish new translations of French works. These graphic novels were published in the classic American comic book format in order to not put off American readers. New works were translated, such as The Zombies That Ate the World and I Am Legion.

In 2010, Humanoids cancelled the agreement with Devil's Due and began publishing their own translated works in North America. Following its standard practice, the company chose to publish old translations as well as new European and American works. The post-2010 Humanoids editions are also released on the UK market, with the exception of a few early releases which were licensed to local publishers, such as Titan Books.

The publisher's official website states that "[s]ince 1998 Humanoids has been the only publishing house of European origin with a direct presence in the U.S., and since 2014 the only non-Japanese company publishing its graphic novels directly in Japan, under the brand ユマノイド ("Humanoido")". Reminiscent of the agreement Humanoids had made with DC Comics, recent Japanese-language books are co-released with Japanese publishing house PIE Books International.

==== Change of headquarters ====
In 2013, Giger decided to relocate the headquarters of his publishing house from Paris to Los Angeles, which reversed the hitherto existing situation with Paris now becoming a scaled-down subsidiary of the American parent company. As stated on the company's official website, the move reflected Giger's ambitions to restructure the company into a "major audiovisual" company, by making "deals with various international and Los Angeles-based partners", which led to the creation of the Humanoids Production Division in 2015.

=== Graphic novels in digital format ===
The 1990s saw the widescale development of IT technology being made accessible to the larger public, as well as the arrival of the Internet in the homes of individual users. Humanoïdes began investigating the feasibility of digitizing its collection. However, screen resolutions and bandwidth were too low to permit satisfactory usage. The CD-ROM format was then chosen, with Enki Bilal's The Nikopol Trilogy and Manara's Gulliveriana being published as part of the "Digital Comics" collection. Sales were disappointing, however, and comic book publishers returned to the traditional paper format.

By the late 2000s, smartphones were proliferating, which presented Humanoïdes with an opportunity to make new inroads into the digitization of comics. The new media, dubbed "VideoComics", enabled smartphone users to experience comics with added soundtracks, videos, and even voice actors. A number of IT and web companies expressed interest in this new form of comics distribution, and Humanoïdes gave two of them the rights to digitally distribute their works.

The latest development in digital distribution of comics has been the widespread use of tablet computers. This technology led Humanoïdes to systematically digitize the entire contents of their catalogue, in order to provide its comic books on its website. New publications are often available online even before being released in bookshops, thanks to online streaming.

By 2015, the publisher had completed the digitizing of its entire catalogue.

== Imprints ==
- Big features a line of comics for young readers.
- Life Drawn features graphic novels focused on diverse social themes by different creators.
- The Jodoverse is a shared universe created by filmmaker Alejandro Jodorowsky.
- H1 features Humanoids' own shared universe where a mysterious worldwide event turns lot of ordinary people into superhumans.

== Publications ==
=== Selected list ===
- The Adventures of Freddy Lombard
- Airtight Garage
- Arzach
- The Black Order Brigade
- Domu: A Child's Dream
- Exterminator 17
- The Hunting Party
- The Incal
- Lucha Libre
- Metabarons
- Psychorock
- Technopriests
- The Zombies That Ate The World

=== Meta-series ===
==== The Incal universe ====
First created by Jodorowsky and Mœbius specifically for the first Incal graphic novel, the universe was gradually develop in a number of series, such as Metabarons, Megalex, or Technopriests.

The universe has developed to such a degree that the publishers have created a specific blog dedicated to linking the various storylines together. The Incal world currently has 35 published volumes, and Les Humanoïdes continues its development in the Castaka and Final Incal.

==== Lucha Libre ====
Jerry Frissen's creation, Lucha Libre is the second important world published by Les Humanoïdes Associés. The series showcases retired, failed Mexican catchers in their urban peregrinations. First published in France in small volumes labelled "anthologies", they were later re-published in a more traditional, hardcover form.

==== Sanctuaire ====
Sanctum began with a first volume published in 2001, with Xavier Dorison as writer and Christophe Bec as illustrator. It has since become prominent in the Humanoids collection. In 2007, the series was re-imagined as Sanctum Redux by writers Stephane Betbeder and Riccardo Crosa, using the same storyline as the original but with manga-style illustrations. Sanctum differs from The Incal, Lucha Libre, and Carthago in that rather than narrating different stories taking place within the same universe, it retells the same story in different manners.

=== Published periodicals ===
- Métal hurlant (1975-1987, 2002–2004)
- Ah ! Nana (1976-1978)
- Casablanca (1982)
- Métal hurlant Aventure (1983-1985)
- Rigolo ! (1983-1984)
- Shogun Mag (2006-2007)
