= Fernando Pasarín =

Spanish comic book artist

- Born: Oviedo, Spain
- Area: Penciller
- Notable works: Batgirl; Green Lantern Corps

Fernando Pasarín is a Spanish comic book artist.

== Biography ==
Pasarín got his start in the Franco-Belgian comics market. He pencilled such series as Strangers and Phenix (written by Jean-Marc Lofficier) for Hexagon Comics, as well as Les Fils de la Louve (written by Patrick Weber) for Le Lombard. His breakthrough into the American market occurred in late 2007, when he worked with Greg Tocchini as a fill-in artist for the DC Comics title Ion: Guardian of the Universe. He was credited as a penciller in issues #9, 11, and 12, although according to Pasarín he only drew for issue #9. Over the next few years, he continued to work for DC Comics, penciling series such as Justice Society of America, Oracle: The Cure, Tangent: Superman's Reign and The Outsiders.

In 2010, it was announced that he would pencil the first issue, issue #0, of DC's Blackest Night follow-up series, Brightest Day.

== Bibliography ==
Interior pencil art (except where noted) includes:

=== DC ===
- The Atom & Hawkman #49 (Blackest Night special) (inks over Ryan Sook pencils, 2010)
- Batgirl, vol. 3, #21-25, 28–29, 31-34 (2013–14)
- Batman Eternal #30-31 (2015)
- Birds of Prey #127 (Oracle backup story) (2009)
- Brightest Day #0 (among other artists) (2010)
- Countdown #16 (2008)
- Deathstroke, vol. 4, #36-41, 44-47 (2018-2019)
- Detective Comics, vol. 2, #48-52 (2016)
- Green Lantern Corps, vol. 3, #0, 1–2, 4–6, 8–12, 14–17, 19-20 (2012)
- Green Lantern Emerald Warriors #1-10 (2010–11)
- Ion: Guardian of the Universe #9, 11-12 (2007)
- Hal Jordan and the Green Lantern Corps #47 (2018)
- Hawkman vol. 5 #20-24, 26-29 (2020)
- Justice League, vol. 3, #15-19, 26-31 (2017)
- Justice League: Generation Lost #16 (2011)
- Justice League vs. Suicide Squad #4 (2017)
- Justice Society of America, vol. 2, #5, 8, 13, 16–17, 24 (2007–09)
- Justice Society of America: Kingdom Come Special:
  - Magog (2009)
  - The Kingdom (2009)
- Justice Society of America: Thy Kingdom Come, miniseries, #1-3 (2008)
- Oracle: The Cure, minisieres, #1-3 (2009)
- Outsiders, vol. 3, #19, 21-25, 31 (2009-10)
- Suicide Squad, vol. 4, #33-34 (2018)
- Super Sons/Dynomutt Special #1 (2018)
- Tangent: Superman's Reign, minisieres, #1-6 (2008)
