= Jean-Marc Lofficier =

French writer (born 1954)

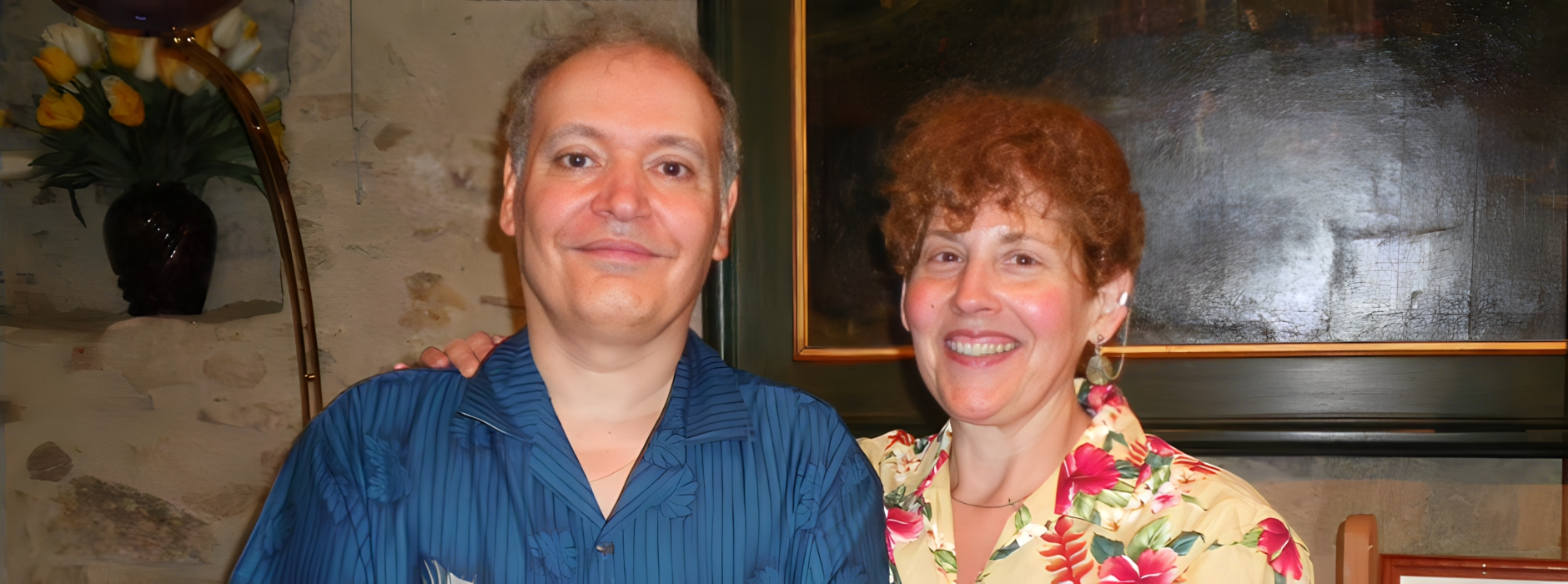
- Jean-Marc & Randy Lofficier in 2011.
- Born: June 22, 1954 (age 72); Toulon, France
- Occupation: Writer
- Spouse: Randy Lofficier
- Website: lofficier.com

Jean-Marc Lofficier (French: [lɔfisje]; born June 22, 1954) is a French author of books about films and television programs, as well as numerous comics and translations of a number of animation screenplays. He usually collaborates with his wife, Randy Lofficier (born Philadelphia, Pennsylvania, U.S., on February 3, 1953); credits sometimes read "R. J. M. Lofficier", their combined initials.

== Biography ==
Jean-Marc Lofficier was born in Toulon, France, in 1954. The son of a serviceman, he moved several times during his formative years, spending "a goodly part of my childhood in Bordeaux, and my teenage years in Fontainebleau". A budding writer from an early age, Lofficier also "drew my own little comic strips when I was 13, 14, and began being published in French 'zines at 16." Recalling in 2005 that "writing wasn't deemed a respectable, economically sound way of making a living," he got an MBA and a law degree, then went to work in international banking.

Graduating from the Paris 1 Panthéon-Sorbonne University and from ESCP Europe business school in 1978, Jean-Marc Lofficier worked for Barclays Bank in Paris for a year before being hired by Crédit Lyonnais and moving to Los Angeles, California, U.S., where he met Randy. Jean-Marc and Randy were married the following year. Jean-Marc recalled in 2005 that their writing partnership developed alongside their personal relationship; "Randy always wanted to write... [so] it evolved organically in a mutually complementary working relationship.".

Jean-Marc left Crédit Lyonnais in 1985 to join Starwatcher Graphics, a new company set up by French artist Mœbius and his wife Claudine, then living in Santa Monica, California. After Mœbius returned to France, and Starwatcher Graphics was disbanded in 2000, the Lofficiers started their own company, Hollywood Comics, which advises and counsels comic book professionals in their dealings with Hollywood. Jean-Marc and Randy moved to Chalabre, in the south of France, in 2005.

=== Magazines and Hollywood ===
In 1979, the Lofficiers built on Jean-Marc's earlier work for fanzines and French magazines – including Lunatique and L'Écran fantastique, for which he wrote a combination of articles, reviews and short stories – and began working as "film journalists" for a variety of "cinema/sf pro magazines." Covering the Hollywood-based film industry (and particularly those aspects with a Sci-Fi or Fantasy bent), the Lofficiers wrote for a number of magazines created both for American and overseas audiences.

Their work appeared in such mainstream U.S. publications as Starlog, Cinefex, Heavy Metal and American Cinematographer, as well as more focused publications including T. E. D. Klein's The Twilight Zone Magazine. Overseas, the Lofficiers' work appeared in United Kingdom magazines including Dez Skinn's Starburst (the magazine of "Science Fantasy in Television, Cinema and Comix") and House of Hammer, while in France, they continued to contribute to L'Écran fantastique.

=== Guides, books and novels ===
The Lofficiers' magazine work, which included short stories, retrospectives and TV program guides alongside journalistic articles, led naturally to them co-authoring a number of non-fiction books about film and television programs. Their first – The Doctor Who Programme Guide, published by W. H. Allen in 1981 – arose from their work for French magazine L'Écran fantastique. The pair produced

"a series of dossiers on SF TV series for L'Ecran Fantastique: The Prisoner, Star Trek, Twilight Zone and... Doctor Who. For that [Who] dossier [Jean-Marc Lofficier] interviewed Terrance Dicks and Graham Williams. Then I sent them a courtesy copy. Terrance passed it on to Christine Donougher at W. H. Allen who saw an opportunity to publish it as a book."

This title in turn led to the Lofficiers producing several novelizations and editing various anthologies of science fiction and fantasy short stories.

=== Animation and comics ===
In 1985, Randy Lofficier completed Harry Love's Animation Writing Seminar at Hanna-Barbera, which led the Lofficiers to write a number of animation scripts for television series such as The Real Ghostbusters and Duck Tales. They also began to write numerous scripts for a variety of comic books, often in collaboration with other writers, notably Roy Thomas and Marv Wolfman, for both Marvel Comics and DC Comics. Their best-known works include a trilogy of DC Elseworlds based on German Expressionism cinema incorporating characters such as Superman, Batman and Wonder Woman, the Book of the Vishanti back-up feature for Doctor Strange: Sorcerer Supreme, two stories for Clive Barker’s Hellraiser, and the Tongue*Lash series for Dark Horse Comics.

From 2000 to 2003, Jean-Marc Lofficier was editor and senior writer of a line of French comic books published by Semic Comics, redeveloping old French characters from the 1960s such as Wampus, Kabur, Phenix, Homicron, Dragut and Dick Demon into more modern versions, even gathering a number of them in the mini-series Strangers published by Image Comics in 2003. This universe of characters is now gathered as Hexagon Comics. The Lofficiers also wrote "Blood Oath", a crossover between Phenix and Top Cow's Witchblade. Starting in 2010, the Lofficiers started to reprint the "classic" stories from the 1960s and 1970s in a series of black & white trade paperbacks, as well as write new stories, mostly by relaunching the comic-book Strangers. Since that date, Jean-Marc has been editor-in-chief of Hexagon Comics.

Also for the French comic market, the Lofficiers wrote a trilogy of graphic novels based on the character of Robur created by Jules Verne. Illustrated by Gil Formosa, the first two volumes were nominated for the 2005 Jules Verne Award for Bandes Dessinees. They were published in English in Heavy Metal.

=== Translation ===
In 1985, the Lofficiers were hired by French artist Mœbius to translate and arrange for the publication of his works in English. This led to a series of 30+ graphic novels published mostly by Epic Comics until 1995. During that time, the Lofficiers also translated numerous French comics for Dark Horse Comics, co-editing their comic Cheval Noir, and for Renegade Press, co-editing their comic French Ice, featuring the series Carmen Cru by French artist Jean-Marc Lelong. In 1990, in recognition of their career as writers, translators and editors, the Lofficiers were presented with the Inkpot Award for Outstanding Achievement in Comic Arts.

=== Pulps and science fiction ===
In 2003, the Lofficiers created their own small press, Black Coat Press, to translate and publish classics of French pulp literature into English, relying in part on the output of British writer/translator Brian Stableford.

In 2005, the Lofficiers started another small press, Rivière Blanche, to publish French science fiction novels in the nostalgic style of the long-defunct Anticipation imprint of Editions Fleuve Noir.

Lofficier's official website includes a section entitled "Illustrated History of the French Saint Novels", a guide to French-language novels based upon the character of Simon Templar (alias "The Saint"), created by Leslie Charteris.

== Works ==
=== Bibliography ===
==== Books ====
Books include:

- Fiction:
  - Robonocchio en Francais (children's; Black Coat Press, 2004, ISBN 1-932983-04-X)
  - Robonocchio en Español (children's; Black Coat Press, 2004, ISBN 1-932983-25-2)
  - Les Survivants de l'Humanité (novel; Rivière Blanche, 2004, ISBN 1-932983-24-4)
  - Chevalier Coqdor:
    - Le Quatorzième Signe du Zodiaque (with Jean-Michel Archaimbault and Maurice Limat, novel; Rivière Blanche, 2006, ISBN 1-932983-74-0)
    - Là Où s'ouvre l'Univers (with J.-M. Archaimbault & M. Limat, novel; Rivière Blanche, 2008, ISBN 1-934543-12-8)
    - Le Retour d'Hypnôs (with J.-M. Archaimbault & M. Limat, novel; Rivière Blanche, 2009, ISBN 1-934543-38-1)
  - Edgar Allan Poe on Mars: The Further Memoirs of Gullivar Jones (novel; Black Coat Press, 2007, ISBN 1-934543-09-8) / Edgar Allan Poe sur Mars (Riviere Blanche, 2013, ISBN 9781612272078)
  - If Your Possum Go Daylight... (poetry by Randy Lofficier, illustrated by Raven Okeefe, Black Coat Press, 2009, ISBN 978-1-934543-78-8)
  - Crépuscule Vaudou (novel; Baleine imprint, Editions du Seuil, 2008) / The Katrina Protocol (translation of Crépuscule Vaudou) (novel; Black Coat Press, 2008, ISBN 1-934543-40-3)
  - Pacifica (short story collection; Rivière Blanche, 2009, ISBN 1-934543-73-X) / Black Coat Press, 2010, ISBN 978-1-935558-29-3)
  - Pas de Pitié pour les Borloks (with Jean-Michel Archaimbault, Rivière Blanche, 2012, ISBN 978-1-61227-122-4)
  - Return of the Nyctalope (novel; Black Coat Press, 2013, ISBN 978-1-61227-211-5) / Le Retour du Nyctalope (Rivière Blanche, 2013, ISBN 978-1-61227-222-1)
  - Pacifica 2 (short story collection; Rivière Blanche, 2015, ISBN 978-1-61227-477-5) / Black Coat Press, 2016, ISBN 978-1-61227-481-2)
- Non-fiction:
  - Doctor Who:
    - The Doctor Who Programme Guide #1–2 (non-fiction; W. H. Allen, 1981, Vol. 1, ISBN 0-491-02804-0, Vol. 2, ISBN 0-426-20142-6, rev. 2003 ISBN 0-595-27618-0)
    - The Programme Guide (non-fiction; Virgin Books, 1989, rev/exp. 1994, ISBN 0-426-20342-9)
    - The Terrestrial Index (non-fiction; Virgin, 1991, ISBN 0-426-20361-5)
    - The Universal Databank (non-fiction; Virgin, 1992, ISBN 0-426-20370-4)
    - The Nth Doctor (non-fiction; Virgin, 1997, ISBN 0-595-27619-9, rev. 2003 ISBN 0-595-27619-9)
  - The Best Video Films (contrib.) (non-fiction; Warner Books, 1984)
  - Your Movie Guide to Musicals on Videotape (non-fiction; Signet Books, 1985)
  - Your Movie Guide to Children's Videotapes (non-fiction; Signet, 1985)
  - Science Fiction Filmmaking in the 1980s (co-auth. with Lee Goldberg & William Rabkin) (interviews) (McFarland & Company, 1995, ISBN 0-89950-918-5)
  - Into The Twilight Zone: Rod Serling Programme Guide (non-fiction; Virgin, 1995, ISBN 0-86369-844-1, rev. 2003 ISBN 0-595-27612-1)
  - The Dreamweavers: : Interviews with Fantasy Filmmakers of the 1980s (co-auth. with Lee Goldberg & William Rabkin) (interviews) (McFarland, 1996, ISBN 0-7864-0085-4)
  - French Science Fiction, Fantasy, Horror & Pulp Fiction (non-fiction; McFarland, 2000, ISBN 0-7864-0596-1)
  - Pocket Essential Tintin (non-fiction; Pocket Essentials, 2002, ISBN 1-904048-17-X, ISBN 978-1-84243-226-6)
  - Shadowmen (non-fiction) Black Coat Press, 2003, ISBN 0-9740711-3-7)
  - Shadowmen 2: Heroes and Villains of French Comics (non-fiction; Black Coat Press, 2004, ISBN 0-9740711-8-8)
  - Over Here: An American Expat in the South of France (bio) (Black Coat Press, 2006, ISBN 1-932983-68-6)
  - Les Petites Recettes d'une Américaine de l'Aude (cookbook by Randy Lofficier) (2007, ISBN 978-1-934543-96-2)
  - Martervénux: L'Encyclopédie de l'Univers du Chevalier Coqdor (non fiction) (Rivière Blanche, 2008, ISBN 1-934543-21-7)
- Anthologies:
  - Les Maîtres de L'Insolite (anthology; Presses-Pocket, ISBN 2-266-01912-0 (1985); ISBN 2-266-03914-8 (1987); ISBN 2-266-09815-2 (2000); ISBN 2-266-13707-7 (2003))
  - Les Maîtres de la Science-Fiction (anthology; Presses-Pocket, 1999, ISBN 2-266-05505-4)
  - Tales of the Shadowmen:
    - 1. The Modern Babylon (anthology; Black Coat Press, 2005, ISBN 1-932983-36-8)
    - 2. Gentlemen of the Night (anthology; Black Coat Press, 2006, ISBN 1-932983-60-0)
    - 3. Danse Macabre (anthology; Black Coat Press, 2007, ISBN 1-932983-77-5)
    - 4. Lords of Terror (anthology; Black Coat Press, 2008, ISBN 1-934543-02-0)
    - 5. The Vampires of Paris (anthology; Black Coat Press, 2009, ISBN 1-934543-50-0)
    - 6. Grand Guignol (anthology; Black Coat Press, 2010, ISBN 978-1-935558-00-2)
    - 7. Femmes Fatales (anthology; Black Coat Press, 2010, ISBN 978-1-935558-44-6)
    - 8. Agents Provocateurs (anthology; Black Coat Press, 2011, ISBN 978-1-61227-050-0)
    - 9. La Vie en Noir (anthology; Black Coat Press, 2012, ISBN 978-1-61227-145-3)
    - 10. Esprit de Corps (anthology; Black Coat Press, 2013, ISBN 978-1-61227-237-5)
    - 11. Force Majeure (anthology; Black Coat Press, 2014, ISBN 978-1-61227-344-0)
    - 12. Carte Blanche (anthology; Black Coat Press, 2015, ISBN 978-1-61227-447-8)
    - 13. Sang Froid (anthology; Black Coat Press, 2016, ISBN 978-1-61227-578-9)
    - 14. Coup de Grace (anthology; Black Coat Press, 2017)
  - Les Compagnons de l'Ombre (French translations of Tales of the Shadowmen):
    - Tome 1 (Rivière Blanche, 2007, ISBN 1-934543-08-X)
    - Tome 2 (Rivière Blanche, 2008, ISBN 1-934543-32-2)
    - Tome 3 (Rivière Blanche, 2009, ISBN 1-934543-47-0)
    - Tome 4 (Rivière Blanche, 2009, ISBN 1-934543-85-3)
    - Tome 5 (Rivière Blanche, 2010, ISBN 978-1-935558-03-3)
    - Tome 6 (Rivière Blanche, 2010, ISBN 978-1-935558-52-1)
    - Tome 7 (Rivière Blanche, 2011, ISBN 978-1-935558-73-6)
    - Tome 8 (Rivière Blanche, 2011, ISBN 978-1-61227-015-9)
    - Tome 9 (Rivière Blanche, 2011, ISBN 978-1-61227-061-6)
    - Tome 10 (Rivière Blanche, 2012, ISBN 978-1-61227-129-3)
    - Tome 11 (Rivière Blanche, 2012, ISBN 978-1-61227-150-7)
    - Tome 12 (Rivière Blanche, 2013, ISBN 978-1-61227-198-9)
    - Tome 13 (Rivière Blanche, 2013, ISBN 978-1-61227-240-5)
    - Tome 14 (Rivière Blanche, 2014, ISBN 978-1-61227-276-4)
    - Tome 15 (Rivière Blanche, 2014, ISBN 978-1-61227-339-6)
    - Tome 16 (Rivière Blanche, 2015, ISBN 978-1-61227-359-4)
    - Tome 17 (Rivière Blanche, 2015, ISBN 978-1-61227-424-9)
    - Tome 18 (Rivière Blanche, 2016, ISBN 978-1-61227-460-7)
    - Tome 19 (Rivière Blanche, 2016, ISBN 978-1-61227-558-1)
    - Tome 20 (Rivière Blanche, 2017, ISBN 978-1-61227-631-1)
    - Tome 21 (Rivière Blanche, 2017)
    - Tome 22 (Rivière Blanche, 2018)
    - Tome 23 (Rivière Blanche, 2018)
  - Doctor Omega and The Shadowmen (editor, Black Coat Press, 2011, ISBN 978-1-61227-037-1)
  - The Nyctalope Steps In (editor, Black Coat Press, 2011, ISBN 978-1-61227-028-9)
  - Night of the Nyctalope (editor, Black Coat Press, 2012, ISBN 978-1-61227-102-6) / La Nuit du Nyctalope (editor, Rivière Blanche, 2012, ISBN 978-1-61227-108-8)
  - The Many Faces of Arsène Lupin (editor, Black Coat Press, 2012, ISBN 978-1-61227-049-4)
  - The Shadow of Judex (editor, Black Coat Press, 2013, ISBN 978-1-61227-178-1)
  - Harry Dickson vs The Spider (translation/adaptation, Black Coat Press, 2014, ISBN 978-1-61227-304-4)
  - The Vampire Almanac (Volume 1) (editor, Black Coat Press, 2014, ISBN 978-1-61227-342-6) / L'Almanach des Vampires (Tome 1) (Riviere Blanche, 2014, ISBN 978-1-61227-342-6)
  - The Vampire Almanac (Volume 2) (editor, Black Coat Press, 2015, ISBN 978-1-61227-383-9) / L'Almanach des Vampires (Tome 2) (Riviere Blanche, 2015, ISBN 978-1-61227-428-7)
  - Sar Dubnotal 2: The Astral Trail (editor, Black Coat Press, 2015, ISBN 978-1-61227-436-2)
  - The French Fantasy Treasury: The World's Edge (Volume 1) (editor, Black Coat Press, 2016, ISBN 978-1-61227-544-4)
  - The French Fantasy Treasury: Myths and Legends (Volume 2) (editor, Black Coat Press, 2016, ISBN 978-1-61227-545-1)
  - The French Fantasy Treasury: Far Realms (Volume 3) (editor, Black Coat Press, 2016, ISBN 978-1-61227-546-8)
  - Doc Ardan: The Abominable Snowman (Black Coat Press, 2016, ISBN 978-1-61227-564-2)
  - Michael Moorcock's Legends of the Multiverse (editor, Black Coat Press, 2017, ISBN 978-1-61227-272-6)
  - Sar Dubnotal contre Dracula (editor, Rivière Blanche, 2017, ISBN 978-1-61227-644-1)
- Novelizations:
  - Basil, The Great Mouse Detective (children's novelization, Scholastic Books, 1986)
  - Arzach – The Novel (novel; Simon & Schuster, 2000; rep. pb. 2004, ISBN 0-7434-9299-4)
- Screenplays:
  - Despair: The Screenplay (screenplay based on a novel by Marc Agapit, Black Coat Press, 2004, ISBN 1-932983-06-6)
  - Royal Flush: The Screenplay (screenplay; Black Coat Press, 2004, ISBN 1-932983-12-0)
  - City: The Screenplay (screenplay inspired by a novel by Joël Houssin, Black Coat Press, 2012, ISBN 978-1-61227-084-5)
- Translations:
  - English Through Comics (translation, 2 vols., Presses-Pocket, 1993)
  - Doctor Omega (translation/adaptation of Arnould Galopin's novel, Black Coat Press, 2003, ISBN 0-9740711-1-0)
  - Arsène Lupin:
    - Arsène Lupin vs. Sherlock Holmes 1: The Hollow Needle (translation/adaptation of Maurice Leblanc's novel, Black Coat Press, 2004, ISBN 0-9740711-9-6)
    - Arsène Lupin vs. Sherlock Holmes 2: The Blonde Phantom (translation/adaptation of Maurice Leblanc's novel, Black Coat Press, 2005, ISBN 1-932983-14-7)
    - Arsène Lupin vs. Countess Cagliostro (translation/adaptation, Black Coat Press, 2010, ISBN 978-1-935558-32-3)
    - The Many Faces of Arsène Lupin (translator/editor, Black Coat Press, 2012, ISBN 978-1-61227-049-4)
    - Arsène Lupin and The Island of the Thirty Coffins (translation/adaptation, Black Coat Press, 2014, ISBN 978-1-61227-338-9)
    - Arsène Lupin: 813 (translation/adaptation, Black Coat Press, 2015, ISBN 978-1-61227-412-6)
  - Doc Ardan:
    - Doc Ardan: City of Gold and Lepers (translation/adaptation of Guy d'Armen's novel, Black Coat Press, 2004, ISBN 1-932983-03-1)
    - Doc Ardan: The Troglodytes of Mount Everest / The Giants of Black Lake (translation/adaptation of Guy d'Armen's novels, Black Coat Press, 2016, ISBN 978-1-61227-483-6)
    - Doc Ardan: The Abominable Snowman (Black Coat Press, 2016, ISBN 978-1-61227-564-2)
  - The Phantom of the Opera (translation/adaptation of Gaston Leroux's novel, Black Coat Press, 2004, ISBN 1-932983-13-9)
  - La Dimension des Miracles Revisitée (French translation of Robert Sheckley's The Dimension of Miracles Revisited, Rivière Blanche, 2007, ISBN 1-934543-17-9)
  - Rouletabille and the Mystery of the Yellow Room (translation/adaptation of Gaston Leroux's novel, Black Coat Press, 2009, ISBN 1-934543-60-8)
  - Harry Dickson:
    - The Heir of Dracula (translation/adaptation, Black Coat Press, 2009, ISBN 1-934543-90-X)
    - Harry Dickson vs The Spider (translation/adaptation, Black Coat Press, 2014, ISBN 978-1-61227-304-4)
    - Harry Dickson: the Man in Grey (translation/adaptation of Arnould Galopin's novel, Black Coat Press, 2016, ISBN 978-1-61227-484-3)
  - The Ice Company (translation/adaptation of Georges-Jean Arnaud's novel, Black Coat Press, 2010, ISBN 978-1-935558-31-6)
  - The Nyctalope:
    - The Nyctalope Steps In (editor, Black Coat Press, 2011, ISBN 978-1-61227-028-9)
    - Night of the Nyctalope (editor, Black Coat Press, 2012, ISBN 978-1-61227-102-6) / La Nuit du Nyctalope (editor, Rivière Blanche, 2012, ISBN 978-1-61227-108-8)
  - Belphégor (translation/adaptation of Arthur Bernède's novel, Black Coat Press, 2012, ISBN 978-1-61227-110-1)
  - Dimension Skylark 1 (French translation of E. E. Smith's The Skylark of Space, Rivière Blanche, 2016, ISBN 978-1-61227-530-7)

==== Comics (writing) ====
===== DC Comics =====
  - Fury of Firestorm #32 (art by Alan Kupperberg, DC Comics, 1985)
  - Arak, Son of Thunder #45–50 (based on plots by Roy Thomas & Dann Thomas, art by Gérald Forton & Tony DeZuniga, DC, 1985)
  - Action Comics #579 (Superman/Asterix) (art by Keith Giffen, DC, 1986)
  - DC Challenge #9 (with Roy Thomas, art by Don Heck, DC, 1986)
  - Teen Titans Spotlight #6: "Jericho" (with Marv Wolfman, art by Ross Andru, DC, 1987)
  - Teen Titans Annual #3 (with Marv Wolfman, art by Mike Collins, DC, 1987)
  - Teen Titans Spotlight #11: "Brotherhood of Evil" (Tintin parody) (art by Joe Orlando, DC, 1987)
  - Star Trek #40 (with Len Wein, art by Tom Sutton, DC, 1987)
  - Teen Titans #44 (art by Mike Collins, DC, 1988)
  - Blue Beetle #14–15, #17–22 (with Len Wein, art by Paris Cullins, DC, 1987–1988)
  - Young All-Stars #12, #16–17 (with Roy Thomas, art by Michael Bair, DC, 1988)
  - Secret Origins: Zatanna #27 (under the pseudonym of Ehrich Weiss, art by Tom Artis, P. Craig Russell, Grant Miehm and Fred Fredericks, DC, 1988)
  - Deathstroke the Terminator #31–33, #37–38 (with Marv Wolfman, art by Steve Erwin, Jaxon Renick, DC, 1994)
  - The Metropolis Trilogy: Superman's Metropolis (with Roy Thomas, art by Ted McKeever, Elseworlds, DC, 64 pages, 1996, ISBN 1-56389-242-1)
  - Legends of the DC Universe: Superman / Transilvane #22–23 (art by José Ladrönn, DC, 1999)
  - The Metropolis Trilogy: Batman: Nosferatu (art by Ted McKeever, Elseworlds, DC, 64 pages, 1999, ISBN 1-56389-379-7)
  - The Metropolis Trilogy: Wonder Woman: The Blue Amazon (art by Ted McKeever, Elseworlds, DC, 64 pages, 2003)

===== Marvel Comics =====
  - Doctor Strange: Sorcerer Supreme #6–8: "Book of the Vishanti" (art by Tom Sutton, Marvel Comics, 1989)
  - Clive Barker's Hellraiser #3: "Blood of a Poet" (art by John Ridgway, Epic, 1990)
  - Dr Strange: Sorcerer Supreme #9–13, 15: "Book of the Vishanti" (art by David Day and Dan Day, Marvel, 1990)
  - Dr Strange: Sorcerer Supreme #16, 17, 20: "Book of the Vishanti" (art by Geof Isherwood, Marvel, 1990)
  - Dr Strange: Sorcerer Supreme #21–23: "Book of the Vishanti" (art by Lee Weeks, Marvel, 1990)
  - The Airtight Garage: The Elsewhere Prince #1–6 (with Mœbius, art by Eric Shanower, Epic Comics, 1990)
  - What If... #15: Fantastic Four (with Roy Thomas, art by Greg Capullo, Marvel, 1990)
  - What If... #19: Avengers (with Roy Thomas, art by Ron Wilson, Marvel, 1990)
  - Dr Strange: Sorcerer Supreme #26–27: "Book of the Vishanti" (art by Geof Isherwood, Marvel, 1991)
  - Dr Strange: Sorcerer Supreme #31–33 (art by Larry Alexander, Marvel, 1991)
  - What If... #24: Wolverine (with Roy Thomas, art by Tom Morgan, Marvel, 1991)
  - Dr Strange: Sorcerer Supreme #37–41, #47 (with Roy Thomas, art by Geof Isherwood, Marvel, 1992)
  - Doctor Strange Annual #2 (back-up features) (art by M. C. Wyman, Dave Hoover, Marvel, 1992)
  - Marvel Super-Heroes Winter '92 (art by Brian Postman, Marvel, 1992)
  - The Airtight Garage: Onyx Overlord #1–4 (with Mœbius, art by Jerry Bingham, Epic, 1992)
  - What If... #35–39 ("Time-Quake") (with Roy Thomas, art by Joe Phillips, Dave Hoover, Mark Pacella, Marshall Rogers, M. C. Wyman, Gavin Curtis, Marvel, 1992)
  - The Avengers Annual #22 (Anachronauts) (with Roy Thomas, art by Al Milgrom, Marvel, 1993)
  - Clive Barker's Hellraiser Summer Special ("The Devil's Absolution") (art by Jorge Zaffino, Epic, 1993)
  - Marvel Super-Heroes Summer '93 (art by Greg LaRocque, Marvel, 1993)
  - Thunderstrike #13–16 (Code: Blue) (with Roy Thomas, art by Larry Alexander, Marvel, 1994)
  - Mystic Arcana: Black Knight (with Roy Thomas, art by Tom Grummett and Eric Nguyen, Marvel, 2007)

===== Independent US publishers =====
  - Legends of Arzach #1–6 (Kitchen Sink Press, 1992)
  - H. P. Lovecraft's Cthulhu #1–3 (with Roy Thomas, art by Brian Bendis, Millennium, 1994)
  - Cadillacs and Dinosaurs #5 (back-up feature) (art by Sylvain Despretz, Topps, 1994)
  - The Frankenstein-Dracula War #1–3 (with Roy Thomas, art by Claude Saint Aubin, Topps, 1995)
  - Star Trek: Deep Space Nine #26–27 ("Mudd's Pets") (Malibu Comics, 1995)
  - Tongue*Lash: The Serpent's Tooth (art by Dave Taylor, Dark Horse Comics, 1996)
  - Tongue*Lash: The Hidden Place (art by Dave Taylor, Dark Horse, 1999)
  - Phantom of Which Opera? (art by Timothy J. Green II, in Frank Frazetta's Magazine, 1999 / Mustang #302, Semic Comics, 2002)
  - Hogun Temu (Forbidden Book #1) (art by Philippe Xavier, Renaissance Press, 2001)

====== Hexagon Comics ======
  - Kabur (Special-Zembla #158–176) (art by Luciano Bernasconi, Mike Ratera, Willy Hudic, Martin Manuel Peniche, Juan Roncagliolo Berger, Semic, 2001–2003; reprinted Hexagon Comics, 2009–10)
  - Homicron (art by Jean-Jacques Dzialowski, Fantask #1–4, Semic, 2001; trade paperback, Semic, 2003; reprinted Hexagon Comics, 2010))
  - Gallix (Special-Zembla #160) (art by Olivier Peru & Stephane Peru, Semic, 2001)
  - Drago (Special-Rodeo #171) (art by Olivier Peru & Stephane Peru, Semic, 2001)
  - Zembla (Special-Zembla #163–165) (art by Jean-Jacques Dzialowski, Semic, 2001)
  - Wampus (Fantask #3–5; Mustang #303–306; Planète Comics #14) (art by Luciano Bernasconi, Semic, 2001–02; reprinted Hexagon Comics, 2010))
  - Dragut (Kiwi #560–576) (art by Jean-Marc Lainé, Olivier & Stephane Peru, Alfredo Macall, Semic, 2001–03; reprinted Hexagon Comics, 2010))
  - Phenix (art by Frederic Grivaud, Mariano de la Torre, Juan Roncagliolo Berger, Fantask #5; Planète Comics #14; Yuma #1–8) (Semic; 2001–03); reprinted Hexagon Comics, 2011))
  - Lagrid (Special-Zembla #164, 176) (art by Philippe Xavier, Semic, 2002)
  - Galaor (art by Olivier & Stephane Peru, Special-Zembla #164) (Semic, 2002)
  - Brigade Temporelle (art by Timothy J. Green II, Fantask #5, Planète Comics #14) (Semic, 2002)
  - Starlock (Yuma #1–2) (art by Luciano Bernasconi, Semic, 2002; reprinted Hexagon Comics, 2010))
  - Bathy-09 (Yuma #3) (art by Marc Lataste, Semic 2002)
  - Tanka (Special-Zembla #167) (art by Yves Mondet, Semic, 2002; reprinted Hexagon Comics, 2010))
  - Jaleb (Special-Zembla #167) (art by Annibale Casabianca, Semic, 2002; reprinted Hexagon Comics, 2010–11))
  - Jaydee (Special-Zembla #168) (art by Danilo Grossi, Semic, 2002; reprinted Hexagon Comics, 2010))
  - Strangers (Season 1) (art by Manuel Garcia and Fernando Blanco, Planète Comics #14, Strangers #1–4, Image Comics #1–3, Yuma #9–10, Semic, 2002–03; Strangers #1–6, Image Comics, 2003; reprinted Wanga Comics, 2010))
  - Frank Universal (Yuma #4) (art by Jean-Jacques Dzialowski, Semic, 2003)
  - Legion Loufoque (Yuma #6, #10) (art by Cyril Bouquet and David Lafuente, SEMIC, 2003)
  - Dick Demon (Mustang #309–313) (art by Jean-Michel Arden, Semic, 2003)
  - King Kabur #1: Les Seigneurs Blêmes (art by Mike Ratera, Semic, 2003)
  - Witchblade: Serment de Sang/Blood Oath (art by Stephane Roux, Semic, 2004; Top Cow, 2004, ISBN 1-58240-396-1)
  - Brigade Temporelle: La Guerre du Graal (art by Timothy J. Green II) (Semic, 2005; Hexagon Comics, 2017)
  - Hexagon (Three volumes) (Hexagon Comics, 2011)
  - Hexagon Universe (five issues) (Wanga Comics, 2011)
  - Strangers (Season 2) (Wanga Comics, 2012–2014)
  - Dick Demon: Point de Chute (Hexagon Comics, 2013)
  - Strangers Universe (Wanga Comics, 2012-ongoing)
  - Kidz (Hexagon Comics, 2012)
  - Les Partisans (with Roy Thomas, art by Mario Guevara, Hexagon Comics, 2014)
  - Strangers (Season 3) (Hexagon Comics, 2014–2015)
  - Garde Républicain Spécial Noël 2014 (art by Roberto Castro, Eduardo Garcia) (Hexagon Comics, 2014)
  - Kabur: L'Etoile Rouge (art by Mike Ratera, Hexagon Comics, 2015)
  - Hexagon: La Ruche Noire (art by Jose Luis Ruiz, Hexagon Comics, 2015)
  - Bouche Rouge: L'Aube Ecarlate (with Marv Wolfman, art by Mario Guevara, Hexagon Comics, 2015)
  - Garde Républicain Spécial Noël 2015 (art by Alfredo Macall) (Hexagon Comics, 2015)
  - Strangers (Season 4) (art by various) (Hexagon Comics, 2016–2017)
  - Garde Républicain Spécial Noël 2016 (art by Eduardo Garcia) (Hexagon Comics, 2016)
  - The Time Brigade: The Grail Wars (art by Timothy J. Green II) (Hexagon Comics, 2017)
  - Strangers (Season 5) (art by various) (Hexagon Comics, 2017–18)
  - Garde Républicain Spécial Noël 2017 (art by Manuel Martin Peniche) (Hexagon Comics, 2017)
  - Garde Républicain Spécial Vacances (art by Alfredo Macall) (Hexagon Comics, 2018)
  - Tiger & The Eye (art by Jose Luis Ruiz Perez) (Hexagon Comics, 2018)

===== French publishers =====
  - Alone in the Dark (art by Matt Haley & Aleksi Briclot, Semic, 2001 / Image Comics, 2002)
  - Nightspeeder (art by Kevin O'Neill, Kog #2, Harnois, 2001)
  - Motor Mayhem (art by Manuel Garcia & Eduardo Alpuente, Semic, 2001)
  - The Restaurant (Mustang #307) (art by Timothy J. Green II, Semic, 2002)
  - Cassandra Troy (Mustang #310) (art by Gerald Forton, Semic, 2003)
  - Robur: De la Lune à la Terre/From the Moon to the Earth (art by Gil Formosa, Albin Michel, 2003; Heavy Metal, December 2003)
  - Robur 2: 20000 Ans sous les Mers/20000 Years Under the Sea (art by Gil Formosa, Albin Michel, 2004; Heavy Metal, Fall 2005)
  - Robur 3: Voyage au Centre de la Lune/Journey to the Center of the Moon (art by Gil Formosa, Albin Michel, 2005; Heavy Metal, Fall 2007)
- UK publishers:
  - The Last Party on Earth in A1 #4 (Atomeka, 1990)
- Italian publishers:
  - Martin Mystere: Almanacco 2012: L'Ombra di Fantomas (with Alfredo Castelli, art by Dante Spada, Sergio Bonelli Editore, 2012)

==== Comics (translations) ====
Works by Mœbius:

- Mœbius
  - #1 – Upon A Star (Marvel/Epic Comics, 1987)
  - #2 – Arzach (Marvel/Epic Comics, 1987)
    - Legends of Arzach #1–6 (Tundra Press, 1992)
      - Visions of Arzach (Tundra, 1993)
    - Arzach (Dark Horse, 1996)
  - #3 – The Airtight Garage (Marvel/Epic Comics, 1987)
  - #4 – The Long Tomorrow (written by Dan O'Bannon) (Marvel/Epic Comics, 1987)
    - The Exotics (Dark Horse, 1997)
  - #5 – The Gardens of Aedena (Marvel/Epic Comics, 1988)
  - #6 – Pharagonesia (Marvel/Epic Comics, 1988)
    - Rock City (Dark Horse, 1996)
  - #7 – The Goddess (Marvel/Epic Comics, 1990)
  - #8 – Mississippi River (written by Jean-Michel Charlier) (Marvel/Epic Comics, 1991)
  - #0 – The Horny Goof (Dark Horse, 1990)
  - #1/2 – The Early Mœbius (Graffiti, 1992)
  - #9 – Stel (Marvel/Epic Comics, 1994)
  - The Art of Mœbius (edited by Byron Preiss, Marvel/Epic/Berkley Books, 1989)
  - Carnet 3 and Interview '74 in A-1 No. 4 (Atomeka, 1990)
  - Chaos (Marvel/Epic, 1991)
  - Metallic Memories (Marvel/Epic, 1992)
  - Fusion (Marvel/Epic, 1995)
  - The Man From The Ciguri in Cheval Noir #26–50 (Dark Horse, 1992–94)
    - The Man from the Ciguri (Dark Horse, 1996)
  - Mœbius Comics #1–6 (Caliber Press, 1996–97)
- Marie-Dakar in Dark Horse Presents No. 63 (Dark Horse, 1992)
- The Incal (written by Alejandro Jodorowsky)
  - The Incal #1–3 (Marvel/Epic, 1988)
  - In the Heart of the Impregnable Meta-Bunker in A-1 No. 4 (Atomeka, 1990)
    - In the Heart of the Impregnable Meta-Bunker in Heavy Metal(1990)
  - Metabarons No. 1 – Othon the Great (Heavy Metal, 1995)
- Blueberry (written by Jean-Michel Charlier)
  - Blueberry No. 1 – Chihuahua Pearl (incl. The $500,000 Man) (Marvel/Epic Comics, 1989)
  - Blueberry No. 2 – Ballad for a Coffin (inc. The Outlaw) (Marvel/Epic Comics, 1989)
    - The Blueberry Saga (Mojo Press, 1996)
  - Blueberry No. 3 – Angel Face (inc. Broken Nose) (Marvel/Epic Comics, 1990)
  - Blueberry No. 4 – The Ghost Tribe (inc. The Long March) (Marvel/Epic Comics, 1990)
  - Blueberry No. 5 – The End of the Trail (inc. The Last Card) (Marvel/Epic Comics, 1990)
  - Young Blueberry No. 1 – Blueberry's Secret (Catalan Communications/Comcat, 1989)
  - Young Blueberry No. 2 – A Yankee Named Blueberry (Catalan Communications/Comcat, 1990)
  - Young Blueberry No. 3 – The Blue Coats (Catalan Communications/Comcat, 1990)
  - Lt. Blueberry No. 1 – The Iron Horse (Marvel/Epic Comics, 1991)
  - Lt. Blueberry No. 2 – Steelfingers (Marvel/Epic Comics, 1991)
  - Lt. Blueberry No. 3 – General Golden Mane (inc. The Trail of the Sioux) (Marvel/Epic Comics, 1991)
  - Marshal Blueberry – The Lost Dutchman's Mine (inc. The Ghost with Golden Bullets) (Marvel/Epic, 1991)
  - Blueberry – Arizona Love in Cheval Noir #46–50 (Dark Horse, 1993)
- The Magic Crystal #1–3 (written by Mœbius; art by Marc Bati)
  - #1 – The Magic Crystal (Catalan Communications/Comcat, 1990)
  - #2 – Island of the Unicorn (Catalan Communications/Comcat, 1990)
  - #3 – Aurelys's Secret (Catalan Communications/Comcat, 1990)
- M. Mouche in A-1 No. 3 (written by Jean-Luc Coudray, Atomeka, 1989)
- Eyes of the Cat in Taboo No. 4 (written by Alejandro Jodorowsky, Spiderbaby, 1990)
- The Madwoman of the Sacred-Heart in Dark Horse Presents #70–76 (Dark Horse, 1993)
  - The Madwoman of the Sacred-Heart #1-#2 (Dark Horse, 1996)

Cheval Noir (Dark Horse, 1989–94)

- Adele Blanc-Sec by Jacques Tardi
  - #1 – Adele and the Beast in #1–5 (1989)
    - (NBM Publishing, 1990)
  - #2 – The Demon of the Eiffel Tower in #6–8 (1990)
    - (NBM, 1991)
  - #3 – The Mad Scientist in #15–18 (1990)
  - #4 – Mummies on Parade in #19–23 (1991)
  - #5 – The Secret of the Salamander (one-shot) (Dark Horse, 1992)
  - Adieu, Brindavoine in #24–27 (1992)
  - The Flower in the Rifle in No. 29 (1992)
- Lone Sloane by Philippe Druillet
  - #1 – The Six Voyages of Lone Sloane in #1–6 (1989)
    - (NBM, 1990)
  - #2 – Delirius in #7–12 (1990)
- Rork by Andreas
  - #1 – Fragments in #1–3, 5–7 (1989)
    - (NBM, 1990)
  - #2 – Passages in #13–17 (1990)
    - (NBM, 1991)
  - #3 – The Graveyard of Cathedrals in #19–23 (1991)
  - #4 – Starlight in #36–40 (1992)
    - (NBM, 1992)
  - #5 – Capricorn in #47–50 (1993)
- Fred & Bob in Cheval Noir #1–3, 5–8, 10–11, 20, 22–23, 26 (1989–91)
- Les Cites Obscures by Benoit Peeters & François Schuiten
  - Fever in Urbicand in #1–6 (1990)
    - (NBM, 1990)
  - "The Tower in #9–14 (1991)
    - (NBM, 1993)
- Coutoo by Andreas in #8–11 (1990)
  - Coutoo (one-shot) (Dark Horse, 1991)
- The Roach Killer in #10–14 (1991)
  - (NBM, 1992)
- The Great Power of the Chninkel by Jean Van Hamme & Grzegorz Rosiński in #13–22 (1991)
- Jordan in #23–26, 28 (1992)

Other:

- French Ice #1–13 (Carmen Cru by Jean-Marc Lelong, Kador by Christian Binet) (Renegade Press, 1987–88)
- Aquablue #1–2 (by Thierry Cailleteau & Olivier Vatine) (Dark Horse Comics, 1989–1990)
- French Ticklers #1–3 (Kitchen Sink Press, 1989–90)
- "The Fugue" in Taboo No. 4 (by Philippe Foerster, Spiderbaby Grafix, 1990)
- "The Music-Loving Spider" in Taboo No. 7 (by Foerster) (Spiderbaby, 1992)
- "First Signs of Activity..." in Snarf No. 14 (by Edika) (Kitchen Sink, 1990)
- "Chomdu" in Snarf No. 15 (by Edika) (Kitchen Sink, 1990)
- Chip 'n' Dale (The Walt Disney Company, 1990)
- Nosferatu (by Philippe Druillet) (Dark Horse, 1991)
- Cromwell Stone (by Andreas) (Dark Horse, 1992)
- Nestor Burma No. 1 – The Bloody Streets of Paris (by Léo Malet & Jacques Tardi) (Simon & Schuster, 2004).
- Wampus No. 1 (Hexagon, 2005) ISBN 1-932983-61-9
- C.L.A.S.H. (Hexagon, 2006) ISBN 1-932983-62-7
- Phenix No. 1 (Hexagon, 2006) ISBN 1-932983-63-5
- Kabur No. 1 (Hexagon, 2006) ISBN 1-932983-83-X
- Zembla No. 1 (Hexagon, 2007) ISBN 1-932983-93-7
- "Homicron" in Strangers No. 1 (Hexagon, 2008) ISBN 1-934543-10-1
- "Jaydee" in Strangers No. 2 (Hexagon, 2009) ISBN 1-934543-42-X
- "Starlock" in Strangers No. 3 (Hexagon, 2009) ISBN 1-934543-65-9

=== Filmography ===
==== Animation ====
- Super Friends: The Legendary Super Powers Show : "Apokolips Now" (unproduced, Hanna-Barbera, 1985)
- Duck Tales : "Magica's Shadow War" (The Walt Disney Company, 1986)
- The Real Ghostbusters : "The Ghostbusters in Paris", "The Headless Motorcyclist" (DIC Entertainment/Columbia Pictures, 1986)
- Bionic Six : "The Hive", "Bone of Contention" (TMS Entertainment/Universal Television, 1987)
- Airtight Garage (feature, unproduced, 1989)
- Young Robin Hood : "Merry no More" (Cinar/Hanna-Barbera, 1991)
- Oedipus & Rex (bible, unproduced, ABC Television, 1996)

==== Features ====
- Despair (adapted from a novel by Marc Agapit; in production; 2008)
