= Stéphane Roux (comics) =

French comic book artist

- Roux at Dragon Con in 2026
- Areas: Penciller, Inker

Stéphane Roux is a French comic book artist who is known mostly in America for his cover work for Marvel, DC and Semic comics.

== Career ==
Stéphane Roux has worked on such titles as Witchblade: Blood Oath, scripted by Jean-Marc Lofficier, as well as Sibilla (scripted by Jean-Marc Lainé) and Strangers in the Semic pocket and comics publications.

His longest cover assignment was on Birds of Prey (issues #104 to 127), with notable covers on various titles including Countdown to Final Crisis, Savage She-Hulk, X-Men: Worlds Apart, and The Amazing Spider-Man Extra #2. He has been working on the DC comics series Zatanna, written by Paul Dini, and Star Wars: Agent of the Empire, written by John Ostrander. He is doing covers, fill-ins and short stories for all the majors comic-book companies. He did the poster for New York Comic Con 2013. He recently worked on a Batman: Legends of the Dark Knight story (issue # 41) written by Ray Fawkes. He also drew a Batman: Black and White story, written by Paul Dini called "Role Models", in the Batman Black and White issue # 3, Jan 2014.

For French TV, he is one of the directors and the artistic director for the France 3 TV animated show Foot 2 rue, and does storyboards, character designs and Artistic Direction for animated productions.

== Bibliography ==
=== Covers ===
Gamma Corps #1 Cover art by Stephane Roux

- Action Comics #871
- The Amazing Spider-Man: Extra! #2 (Cover #1)
- Batman Confidential #22-25, 29, 30
- Birds of Prey #102-120, 122-127
- Birds of Prey: Blood and Circuits TPB
- Birds of Prey: Dead of Winter TPB
- Birds of Prey: Kids' Club TPB
- Birds of Prey: Metropolis or Dust TPB
- Birds of Prey: Platinum Flats TPB
- Black Canary: Wedding Planner #1
- Countdown to Final Crisis #9-11, 13, 15, 39-43
- DC Universe: Decisions #1-4
- Gamma Corps #1-3
- Gamma Files #1
- Manhunter #23
- Ms. Marvel #35
- Savage She-Hulk #4 (Cover #1)
- Secret Six: Unhinged TPB
- Star Wars: Agent of the Empire #1-3
- Star Wars: Jedi - The Dark Side #1 (variant), #2-#5
- Star Wars: The Clone Wars - Strange Allies
- Strangers (French comic book) #2
- Supergirl #14, 15, 33, 35
- Superman #682
- Wizard: The Comics Magazine #188
- X-Men: Worlds Apart #4

=== Penciller ===
- Action Comics Annual #11
- Harley Quinn and Power Girl #1-6
- Infinite Crisis Secret Files #1
- Official Handbook of the Marvel Universe A-Z Premiere Hardcover #4
- Star Wars: Agent of the Empire #1 and 2
- Sibilla in Strangers #5, 6
- Witchblade: Blood Oath
- Zatanna #1-3 and #12
