= Doctor Omega =

1906 novel by Arnould Galopin

- First edition
- Author: Arnould Galopin
- Original title: Le Docteur Oméga
- Translator: Jean-Marc Lofficier & Randy Lofficier
- Illustrator: E. Bouard
- Language: French
- Genre: science fiction
- Publisher: Albin Michel (French); Black Coat Press (English)
- Publication date: 1906
- Publication place: France
- English publication date: 2003
- Pages: 258
- ISBN: 0-9740711-1-0
- OCLC: 61478860
- LC Class: PS3612.O37 D63 2003

Doctor Omega (French: Le Docteur Oméga) is a 1906 science fiction novel by French writer Arnould Galopin. Inspired by H. G. Wells's novels The War of the Worlds and The First Men in the Moon, it follows the adventures of the eponymous scientist Doctor Omega and his companions in the spacecraft Cosmos.

== Overview ==
The novel takes place in or around 1906, in an unidentified village in Normandy, then later takes the reader to Mars. The main protagonist, Doctor Omega, is the mysterious inventor of a projectile-shaped spacecraft dubbed Cosmos which can also function on land and under water. Cosmos is 13 meters long and 3 meters in diameter. It is made from a substance called stellite or repulsite (depending on the edition) which repels space and time and enables it to travel in the aether. Its interior is divided into four sections, each lit by electric lights powered by a generator run by an eight-cylinder 200 horsepower (150 kW) motor. The floors are all suspended upon universal joints in order to maintain a normal level. The portholes are made of transparent stellite. In addition to the bridge, the other sections of the ship include a storeroom, an armory, and the crew's sleeping quarters.

Doctor Omega's companions in his travels are two Frenchmen: his neighbour Denis Borel (the narrator), and his worker, the hulkish Fred (no last name given). Doctor Omega and his two companions travel to Mars, where they first land in one of the Martian seas, where they perform some underwater exploration during which they encounter phosphorescent fish and aggressive reptilian mermen. Back on the surface they are attacked by savage dwarf-like beings with long, tentacled arms. Later, they explore the Red Valley in which bat-men have developed artificial wings to cohabit with deadly snakes. They meet another race of civilized macrocephalic gnomes, and are taken before their King, in the city of Fire. They learn to communicate with these Macrocephales, and help them in their war against their Southern enemies, the Cacocytes. The Macrocephales wish to keep Doctor Omega and his companions prisoners on Mars. Doctor Omega and his companions broadcast an SOS and are rescued by the equally mysterious Professor Helvetius. They eventually return to Earth with the Martian, Tiziraou.

== Editions ==
The first edition was published by Librairie Mondiale in Paris, 1906, with illustrations by E. Bouard. The book was later reprinted under the title Les Chercheurs d'Inconnu: Aventures Fantastiques d'un Jeune Parisien (Seekers of the Unknown: The Fantastic Adventures of a Young Parisian) as a 12-issue pulp magazine by Tallandier, Paris, Nos. 1–9, 1908; Nos. 10–12, 1909. For that edition, Galopin changed the name of the ship to "Excelsior" and the substance to "stellite". He also rewrote and expanded several chapters and tried to appeal to a more juvenile audience. A reprint of the first edition was published by Albin Michel in 1949, with illustrations by Rapeno.

In 2003, Los Angeles's Black Coat Press published an edition "adapted and retold" by Jean-Marc Lofficier and Randy Lofficier, with a cover by Gil Formosa. ISBN 0-9740711-0-2 does not contain any illustrations; ISBN 0-9740711-1-0 (Collector's Edition) contains a selection of illustrations by Bouard from the first edition. This edition is a free translation, or adaptation, of the first French edition. The credit adapted and retold was first coined by Philip José Farmer for his 1976 adaptation of the J.-H. Rosny novel Ironcastle. In this instance, some plot inconsistencies were removed or fixed; some scientific notions were updated or corrected; some racist or inappropriate language was deleted. Further, homages and references to the fictional characters Arsène Lupin, Dr. Caresco, and Madeline were inserted. Additionally, references were added to imply that Doctor Omega was the Doctor from Doctor Who, mainly because of the coincidental - but real - similarities between the two characters (especially the First Doctor, played by William Hartnell from 1963 to 1966). Frequent Doctor Who writer Terrance Dicks provided a foreword, and the cover illustration was changed to one similar to the 1973 Target Books novelization of The Daleks.

In 2009, French publisher Riviere Blanche reprinted the first edition, with selected illustrations from Bouard and Rapeno, a new foreword by Jean-Marc Lofficier, French translations of Terrance Dicks's foreword, and stories by Chris Roberson, Matthew Baugh, Travis Hiltz and Serge Lehman featuring Dr. Omega; cover by Gil Formosa. In 2011, the American publisher Black Cat Press printed an unabridged English translation with the original illustrations by E. Bouard. In 2014, Explore Multimedia released an unabridged four-disc English audiobook billed as "the possible origins of Doctor Who". Narrated by John Guilor, who supplied the voice of Hartnell's Doctor in episode "The Day of the Doctor").

In 2018, The student's publishers Méli-Mélo republished the book too.

== Other appearances ==
Doctor Omega is mentioned and Tiziraou appears in a panel of The New Traveler's Almanac of The League of Extraordinary Gentlemen, Volume II.

Doctor Omega appears in several stories in the ongoing anthology Tales of the Shadowmen.

A sequel volume, Doctor Omega and the Shadowmen collect the stories from the above collections, along with new ones.
