= Robur the Conqueror =

1886 novel by Jules Verne

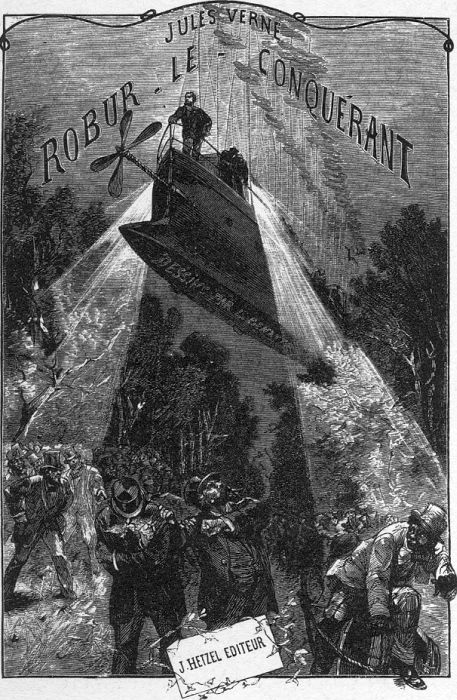
- Frontispiece by Léon Benett
- Author: Jules Verne
- Original title: Robur-le-Conquérant
- Illustrator: Léon Benett
- Language: French
- Series: The Extraordinary Voyages No. 29; Robur the Conqueror #1
- Genre: Science fiction novel
- Publisher: Pierre-Jules Hetzel
- Publication date: 1886
- Publication place: France
- English publication date: 1887
- Media type: Print (hardback)
- Preceded by: The Lottery Ticket
- Followed by: Texar's Revenge, or, North Against South

Robur the Conqueror (French: Robur-le-Conquérant) is a science fiction novel by Jules Verne, published in 1886. It is also known as The Clipper of the Clouds. A sequel was published in 1904 as Master of the World.

== Plot summary ==
The story begins with strange lights and sounds, including blaring trumpet music, reported in the skies all over the world. Then black flags with gold suns mysteriously appear atop tall historic landmarks such as the Statue of Liberty in New York, the Great Pyramid of Giza in Egypt, and the Eiffel Tower in Paris. These events are all the work of the mysterious Robur (the specific epithet for the English oak (Quercus robur) and figuratively taken to mean "strength"), a brilliant inventor who intrudes on a meeting of a flight-enthusiasts' club called the Weldon Institute in Philadelphia, Pennsylvania.

Members of the Weldon Institute are all firm believers that mankind shall master the skies using "lighter than air" craft, and that "heavier than air" craft such as airplanes and helicopters would be unfeasible. The institute has been constructing a giant dirigible called the Go-ahead. During a heated discussion over where to place its propeller (in front to pull it, or behind to push it), Robur appears at the meeting and is admitted to speak. He chastises the group for being balloon-boosters when "heavier than air" flying apparatuses are the future. When asked if Robur himself has "made conquest of the air", he states that he has, leading to him accepting the title "Robur the Conqueror". During his short time at the Weldon Institute, Robur so incites the members that they chase him outside. Just as they are about to attack him, Robur appears to vanish into the mob, but he has actually been borne away by a flying machine.

Later that night Robur kidnaps the Weldon Institute's president, Uncle Prudent; his secretary, Phil Evans; and valet, Frycollin. He takes them on board his ship, a huge, battery-powered "aeronef" called the Albatross, which has many vertical airscrews to provide lift, and two horizontal airscrews in a push-pull configuration to drive the vessel forward. It bears the same black flag with golden sun that has been sighted on many landmarks, and a crewmen playing a trumpet accounts for the music in the sky. To demonstrate the vessel's superiority, Robur takes his captives around the world in the course of three weeks. Prudent and Evans are angry at Robur for kidnapping them and unwilling to admit that the Albatross is a fantastic vessel, or that their notions of "lighter than air" superiority are wrong. They demand that Robur release them, but he is aloof and always says that they shall remain as long as he desires it. Fearing they will be held captive forever, the two formulate plans both to escape and to destroy the Albatross.

After the horizontal propellers are damaged in a storm, the Albatross anchors over the Chatham Islands for repairs. While the crew is busy at work, Prudent and Evans light a fuze and make their escape. They try to bring Frycollin with them but cannot find him, only later discovering that he had already escaped without them. The Albatross explodes and its wreckage, along with Robur and his crew, plunges towards the ocean. Meanwhile, the three escapees are safe on a small but inhabited island and are later rescued by a ship; they then make a long journey back to Philadelphia.

The Weldon Institute members return, and rather than describe their adventures or admit that Robur had created a flying machine greater than their expectations of the Go-ahead, they simply conclude the argument the group was having during their last meeting. Rather than have only one propeller to their dirigible, they decide to have one propeller in front and another behind, similar to Robur's design.

Seven months after their return the Go-ahead is completed and making its maiden voyage with the president, secretary, and an aeronaut. The speed and maneuverability of the dirigible impress a huge crowd, but are trivial compared to Robur's Albatross. Suddenly, out of the sky there appears the Albatross. It is revealed that when the Albatross exploded, enough of it was intact so that at least some of the propellers operated and slowed its descent, saving the crew. The crew used the remains of the Albatross as a raft until they were rescued by a ship. Later, Robur and the crew made it back to his secret X Island, where the original Albatross had been built. Robur has built a new Albatross and now intends to exact revenge by showing that it is superior to the Weldon Institute's Go-ahead.

The entirety of the final scene is described from the crowd's point of view. The Albatross begins circling the Go-ahead; the Go-ahead drops ballast and rises to fourteen thousand feet. The Albatross follows, still a circling menace. The Go-ahead is at the mercy of the Albatross because the Albatross is both faster and more maneuverable. Finally, the Go-ahead exceeds her pressure-height limit, whereupon her gas bags rupture. Losing her buoyant gases, the Go-ahead drops out of the sky like a rapidly descending kite. The Albatross stays alongside of the Go-ahead as she falls, signalling the pilot and passengers of the Go-ahead to come on board the Albatross. They refuse, but then the crew of the Albatross seizes them and brings them aboard.

Having demonstrated his rule over the skies, Robur returns the three men to the ground. In a short speech, Robur says that nations are not yet fit for union. He cautions the crowd that it is evolution, not revolution, that they should be seeking. He leaves with the promise that he will one day return to reveal his secrets of flight. The people of Philadelphia subject Prudent and Evans to unrelenting ridicule for the rest of their lives.

== Influences ==
=== Film ===
The story was adapted into a 1961 film, Master of the World, starring Vincent Price as Robur. The film retained the novel's basic concept but added elements of intrigue and a romantic subplot.

In this version, Robur is an idealist who intends to conquer the world in order to end tyranny and war. He plans to use his airship, the Albatross to bomb the military forces of the world until all nations concede to his demands. (In contrast, the novel's Robur has no such aims, and bombs only one ground target: an African coronation where a mass human sacrifice is about to take place.)

Instead of the Weldon Institute members, he kidnaps Mr. Prudent of Philadelphia, an armaments manufacturer, along with his daughter Dorothy and her fiancé Phillip Evans. Charles Bronson plays Strock, the reluctant hero who comes to admire Robur, but not enough to allow him to carry out his plans.

The name Albatross is retained, though the novel's description and early illustrations that suggest a flush-decked clipper ship with propellers on its masts instead of sails, is replaced by a more contemporary design resembling a classic airship, or dirigible; though still given propellers for lift. The vessel is described in the film as being a 'heavier than air machine of several tons,' a statement later explained as the vessel 'is made entirely of straw paper, mixed with dextrin and clay, and squeezed in a hydraulic press...'

This construction also enables the Albatross to fly high enough to be impervious to contemporary weapons fire. When flown low to the ground, though, Albatross was heavily damaged while within the blast radius of one of its own bombs, and was finally damaged beyond repair and sank into the ocean when the gunpowder in its armory exploded due to sabotage by the passengers.

=== Novels ===
- In Kim Newman's alternate history novel The Bloody Red Baron, Robur (along with other such characters as Rotwang, Count Orlok, and Doctor Mabuse) works for Count Dracula during World War I.
- In Kevin J. Anderson's Captain Nemo: The Fantastic History of a Dark Genius, Robur is an official of the Ottoman Empire locked in a power struggle against his rival, Barbicane.
- In T.E. MacArthur's The Volcano Lady: Volume One and Volume Two, Robur carries out many of his activities from the original novel as a minor character as the novel follows the adventures of Dr. Leticia Gantry, the "Volcano Lady."

=== Comics ===
- Robur the Conqueror was adapted to comic book form in 1961 as Classics Illustrated No. 162.
- A graphic novel trilogy by writers Jean-Marc Lofficier and Randy Lofficier and artist Gil Formosa:
  - Volume 1 De la Lune à la Terre (Albin Michel, 2003) (From the Moon to the Earth, Heavy Metal, December 2003)
  - Volume 2 20.000 Ans sous les Mers (Albin Michel, 2004) (20,000 Years Under the Seas, Heavy Metal, Fall 2005)
  - Volume 3 Voyage au Centre de la Lune (Albin Michel, 2005) (Journey to the Center of the Moon)

In it, Robur (who is also an alias of Captain Nemo) is the leader of the resistance when H. G. Wells' Selenites invade the Earth. Other fictional characters which appear in the series include Fantômas, Josephine Balsamo, The Shadow and Professor Cavor.

- A character similar to Robur, named "Alexandre LeRoi", appears in Batman: Master of the Future, by Brian Augustyn and Eduardo Barreto, an early entry in DC Comics' Elseworlds series. The story mixes a Victorian-era Batman, with the film Master of the World.
- Robur is mentioned several times in the first three volumes of The League of Extraordinary Gentlemen, by Alan Moore and Kevin O'Neill. He is first mentioned in Volume 1 corresponding with Captain Mors, the "Sky Pirate", a German fictional air-based character. An entry in the supplementary The New Traveller's Almanac in the back of Volume 2 indicates that Robur is conscripted to lead Les Hommes Mysterieux ("The Mysterious Men"), which is a French analogue to the British team. Their fateful encounter with the League is detailed in The League of Extraordinary Gentlemen: Black Dossier. Robur also appears as a (losing) square in the attached Game of Extraordinary Gentlemen.

== See also ==
- Mystery airship
- Arthur Constantin Krebs, one of the many inspirations, with Charles Renard, for this novel, with their first fully controlled free-flight 8 August 1884.
