= Le Monde d'Edena =

Series of graphic novels

The World of Edena (Le Monde d'Edena in French, also published in English as The Aedena Cycle) is a series of graphic novels by French artist Jean "Mœbius" Giraud. It grew organically out of a promotional album Mœbius made for the French car manufacturer Citroën, called "The Star", in 1983.

== Background and publication history ==
In the initial story, Mœbius introduces two protagonists, Stel and Atan, who crash on a barren planet and must traverse it in an old Citroën. They eventually stumble on a camp of interstellar refugees surrounding a mysterious pyramid, and are transported to an unknown world described as a 'Garden of Eden somewhere in another galaxy'.

The open ending of the Citroën story inspired Mœbius to wonder what would happen next. He plotted out three or four books' worth of stories that were also conceived as the basis of a coherent Mœbius universe, one which crossed over with other major works like The Airtight Garage. In effect, a recurrent character in the series was "Master [Maître in French] Burg", Stel's dream guide who aided him in his quest on Edena, which was a palindrome of "[Major] Grubert", the main protagonist of The Airtight Garage, and by Mœbius intended to be one and the same person.

Mœbius was strongly influenced by the teachings of Jean-Paul Appel-Guéry, (Note: "Appel-Guéry encouraged Mœbius to tap into the more positive zones of his subconscious. 'Most of the people that were studying spirituality with Appel-Guéry did not know much about comics, but they immediately picked on the morbid, and overall negative feelings that permeated my work', said Mœbius. 'So I began to feel ashamed, and I decided to do something really different, just to show them that I could do it'".) whose commune on Tahiti he had joined with his family in the period 1983-1984, and Swiss nutritionist Guy-Claude Burger, as well as his own transient lifestyle ("The Gardens of Edena" was drawn in Tokyo and Los Angeles for example, and "The Goddess" was begun in France and completed in California, whereas "Stel" was begun in California and completed in France). Questions are posed about dreams, nutrition and health, biology and sexuality, the human desire to live in a structured society, and archetypal good and evil. All of these philosophical elements are organically embedded in deceptively 'light' stories. The two protagonists Stel and Atan for example, stemming from a highly industrialized civilization, (re)discover their human sexuality on Edena, brought on by the circumstance that they, cut off from that civilization, are forced to consume natural nutrition, with Atan in the process becoming "Atana".

Mœbius started out the series by restricting himself to a 'Clear Line' style (Ligne Claire), with minimal details, though in later outings, especially the short stories "The Still Planet" and "The Repairmen", his signature intricate Mœbius graphic style started to resurface, before returning to his original art style for the last outing in the main narrative, Sra.

== Acclaim ==
While Mœbius has received a multitude of (international) awards for the entirety of his body of work, this series did receive three specific ones; the first one concerned the 1991 Spanish Haxtur Award of the Salón Internacional del Cómic del Principado de Asturias, for La Diosa (The Goddess) in the category "Best Drawings". Concurrently, the short story "The Still Planet", which, coming in at 25 pages, accounted for half the contents of the comic book Concrete Celebrates Earth Day 1990 (52 pages, Dark Horse Comics, April 1990) in which it was first published, was decisive in winning the 1991 Eisner Award for "Best Single Issue". Noteworthy was, that the story is created as a wordless comic, save for the title, with only the (highly detailed) art intended to tell the story. In this, Moebius repeated the experimental style utilized for the comic that had brought him international renown in the mid-1970s, Arzach. Additionally, the story was under its French title "La planète encore" adapted into a French-produced animation short in 2010. Mœbius Production served as a production company, with wife Isabelle Giraud serving as one of its producers. Mœbius himself was one of the two directors of the short.

In 2017, five years after the artist had died, Dark Horse Books' The World of Edena, the first volume in Dark Horse's "Mœbius Library" anthology series which collects the entirety of the main narrative series, received a second Eisner Award (USA), this time in the category "Best U.S. Edition of International Material".

== Episodes ==
The series consists of five parts, each published as a separate volume, plus a sixth volume containing shorter stories "Seeing Naples", "Another Planet" (="The Still Planet"), "The Repairmen" and "Dying to See Naples", that are outside of the main narrative:

- Sur l'Étoile (The Star); Paris: Les Humanoïdes Associés, December 1983, ISBN 2731602929
- Les Jardins d'Edena (The Gardens of Edena); Tournai: Casterman, September 1988, ISBN 2203345012
- La Déesse (The Goddess); Tournai: Casterman, September 1990, ISBN 2203345020
- Stel; Tournai: Casterman, April 1994, ISBN 2203345047
- Sra; Tournai: Casterman, September 2001, ISBN 2203345241
- Les Réparateurs (The Repairers); Tournai: Casterman, September 2001, ISBN 2203380381

== English editions ==
In the English language, the series, translated by Jean-Marc and Randy Lofficier, has seen publications between 1988 and 1994 by Marvel Comics (under its Epic imprint), Titan Books, Graphitti Designs, and, at a later point in time, by Dark Horse as well, the latter completing the main narrative in translation in 2016, with the short stories following suit in 2018.

== Other editions ==
All novels have been (re-)released or licensed to foreign publishers in whole or in part by Casterman, in many languages other than English, including French (the originating language), Croatian, Danish, Dutch, Finnish, German, Italian, Japanese, Polish, Portuguese, Spanish and Ukrainian. Some (short) stories have seen serialized prepublication in Casterman's monthly magazine "(À suivre)", as well as in by Casterman licensed foreign comic magazines, but after the magazine went defunct in 1997, new additions were invariably directly released as comic albums.

- De Ster (The Star, Dutch edition), ISBN 90-303-8566-9.
- Stel (Dutch edition), ISBN 90-303-8576-6
