= Luciano Bernasconi =

Italian comic book artist

- Born: 1939 (age 86–87) Rome, Italy
- Area: Artist
- Notable works: Éditions Lug; Hexagon Comics

Luciano Bernasconi (born 1939, Rome) is an Italian comic book artist. In the early 1960s, he worked for fellow artist Carlo Cedroni's Studio Barbato, Éditions Lug in France, and Edizioni Europer in Rome.

== Career ==
Throughout the 1960s and 1970s, Bernasconi became one of Lug's major artists, co-creating a number of major characters such as Wampus, Kabur and Phenix and also Ami Barry, L'Autre, Billy Boyd, Bob Lance, Comte de Saint-Germain, Frères Thunderbolt, Gladiateur de Bronze, Jean Girodet, Jeff Sullivan, Kit Kappa, Sibilla, Starlock and Waki.

In the 1980s, Bernasconi's work appeared in Il Giornalino and he contributed erotic comics to Edifumetto in Milan. He also joined the team of artists working for Il Messaggero.

In the 1990s, he worked on Gordon Linch and had work published in magazines like Intrepido, Crimen (including an adaptation of Sherlock Holmes), and made a comic adaptation of the erotic novel Gamiani.

In 2000, he returned to Kabur, Phenix and Wampus for Semic Comics, the successor of Editions Lug. In 2004, he teamed up with other writers and artists to reclaim the rights to his characters under the banner of Hexagon Comics. Later he collaborated with Enrico Teodorani on Djustine.
