= Harry Dickson =

Fictional pulp detective

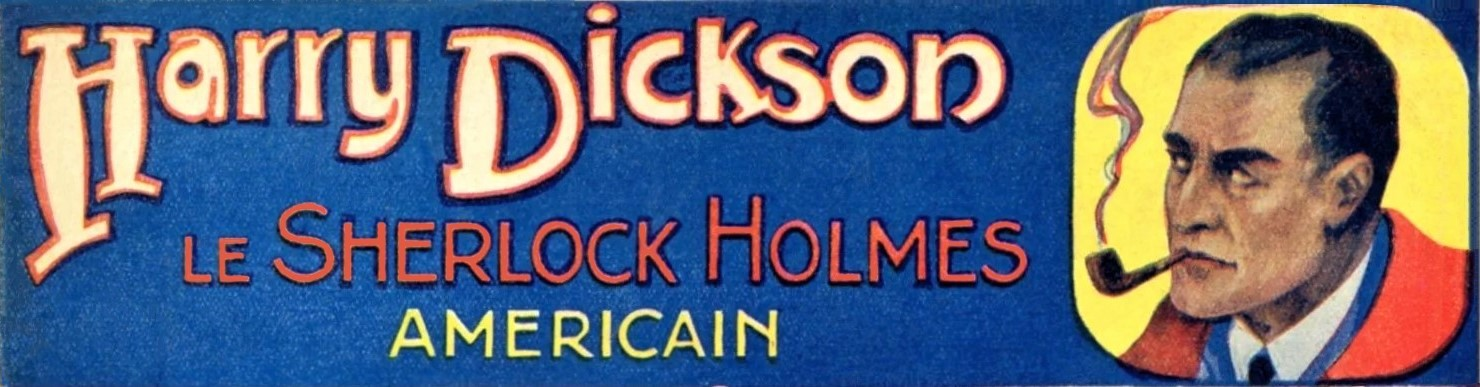
The Harry Dickson cover heading

Harry Dickson is a fictional pulp detective, born in America, educated in London, and was called The American Sherlock Holmes. He has appeared in almost 200 pulp magazines published in Germany, the Netherlands, Belgium and France.

== History ==
The original pulp dime-novel series that later became Harry Dickson began in Germany in January 1907 under the title of Detektiv Sherlock Holmes und seine weltberühmten Abenteuer (Sherlock Holmes' Most Famous Cases), published by Verlagshaus für Volksliteratur und Kunst, and comprised 230 issues in total, published until June 1911. The name Sherlock Holmes was actually used for the first 10 issues. After some concern about the rights of Sir Arthur Conan Doyle, the series was retitled Aus den Geheimakten des Weltdetektivs (The Secret Files of the King of Detectives) with No. 11, even though the main character was still called Sherlock Holmes inside. Holmes' Doctor Watson sidekick, however, was a younger man named Harry Taxon.

Sixteen issues of the original German series were adapted into French starting in October 1907 by publisher Fernand Laven for the magazine La Nouvelle Populaire under the title Les Dossiers Secrets de Sherlock Holmes (Sherlock Holmes' Secret Files) for No. 1, immediately changed to Les Dossiers Secrets du Roi des Détectives (The Secret Files of the King of Detectives) with issue No. 2.

In December 1927, the Dutch-Flemish publisher Roman-Boek-en-Kunsthandel launched a Dutch translation of the original German series, this time entitled Harry Dickson de Amerikaansche Sherlock Holmes (Harry Dickson, the American Sherlock Holmes). The first issue reprinted Aus den Geheimakten des Weltdetektivs No. 40, "An der Pforte des Todes" (At the Gate of Death).

The name Harry Dickson may have been inspired by that of Harry Taxon (from the German edition above), or by writer Arnould Galopin's Allan Dickson, the King of Australian Detectives which had been created in the early 1900s. Allan Dickson even met Sherlock Holmes in L'Homme au Complet Gris (The Man in Grey) (1912).

The Dutch series lasted 180 issues, until May 1935. In it, Dickson's young assistant was renamed Tom Wills

In 1928, Belgian publisher Hip Janssens asked writer Jean Ray to translate the Dutch series into French, for distribution in Belgium and France. The French-language edition, also entitled Harry Dickson, le Sherlock Holmes Americain, began in January 1929.

Eventually, Ray became tired of translating the mediocre original stories. Using the titles and the covers from the original pre-World War I German edition (by artist Alfred Roloff, a member of the Berlin Academy) as starting points, he began to write his own stories. The French edition lasted 178 issues, until April 1938.

== Overview ==
The adventures of Harry Dickson and his young assistant, Tom Wills, have delighted several generations of French readers. Because they were written by a master of horror fiction, they are far more fantasy-oriented than the true Holmesian canon. The best and most fondly remembered Harry Dickson stories are those that pit the Great Detective against some supervillains such as Professor Flax, the mad scientist known as the Human Monster, and, later, his daughter, the equally deadly Georgette Cuvelier, a.k.a. The Spider (with whom Dickson had a love-hate relationship); Euryale Ellis, a beautiful woman who had the power to turn her victims into stone and who may be a reincarnation of the legendary gorgon Medusa; Gurrhu, a living Aztec god who hid in the Temple of Iron, an underground temple located beneath the very heart of London, filled with scientifically advanced devices; the last, living Babylonian mummies who found refuge under a Scottish lake; a nefarious blood-drinking serial killer dubbed the Vampire with Red Eyes; the enigmatic, tuxedo-suited avenger known as Cric-Croc, the Walking Dead; the supervillain Mysteras, who relies on elaborate and deadly illusions; the bloodthirsty Hindu god Hanuman, etc.

Harry Dickson's fame in France rivals that of Sherlock Holmes and Arsène Lupin.

== Fictional Biography ==
Based on various clues mentioned in the series, Harry Dickson was likely born circa 1890 in New York City. He was educated from childhood in England, because his father wanted him to receive a British education. He only spent three months during his summer holidays in New York where, as a child, he befriended Reginald Marlow.

Dickson’s family background is unknown, but we know that Arsène Lupin studied magic with a stage magician named Dickson in Paris in 1893.

At age 15, Dickson was a student in England at the Pertwee Private School and solved a case involving a diamond smuggling ring. At age 20 or about, Dickson enrolled as a student at the University of South Kensington in London and became acquainted with Jean Ray’s armchair detective Mister Triggs. He also helped fellow French student Antoine de Hautefeuille solve a family mystery.

Coincidentally, Arnould Galopin began recording the adventures of a young detective named Allan Dickson also in 1910 although Galopin’s Dickson is said to be Australian.

In 1919, Dickson was on an official intelligence mission in post-war Berlin. There, he met the brilliant Professor Krausse, whom he much impressed. Dickson met Krausse again, ten years later, i.e.: in 1929, when he was already an established detective at 221B Baker Street. This supports the notion that Dickson’s published cases take place from the mid-1920s to the mid- or late 1930s when he was in his late thirties and early forties, which is consistent with his physical description and abilities.

== Bibliography (French Edition) ==
1. Échappé à une Mort Terrible (Escaped from a Dreadful Death) (1929)
2. L'Hôtel Borgne du Caire (The Shady Hotel of Cairo) (1929)
3. Idolatrie Chinoise (Chinese Idol-Worshipping) (1929)
4. Le Testament du Détenu (The Prisoner's Testament) (1929)
5. Le Secret du Gobelin (The Secret of the Gobelin) (1929)
6. L'École pour Meutriers à Pittsburgh (The Pittsburgh Murder School) (1929)
7. L'Europe en Péril (Europe in Danger) (1929)
8. Un Cadeau de Noces Horrible (An Awful Wedding Gift) (1929)
9. Le Roi des Malandrins (The King of Burglars) (1930)
10. Le Mystère de la Tour (The Mystery of the Tower) (1930)
11. Le Drame au Cirque Bianky (The Tragedy of Circus Bianky) (1930)
12. Le Modèle du Faux Monnayeur (The Counterfeiter's Model) (1930)
13. Le Dogue de Soho (The Mastiff of Soho) (1930)
14. Les Douze Coeurs Morts (The Twelve Dead Hearts) (1930)
15. Les Bandits de la Fête Populaire (The Robbers of the Popular Festivities) (1930)
16. Un Chevauchée à la Mort par le St. Gothard (The St. Gothard Death Ride) (1930)
17. Le Capitaine Disparu (The Disappeared Captain) (1930)
18. Le Professeur Flax, Monstre Humain (Prof. Flax, Human Monster) (1930)
19. Une Poursuite à travers le Désert (Desert Pursuit) (1930) (Flax)
20. La Femme à Quatre Faces (The Woman with Four Faces) (1930)
21. Le Repaire aux Bandits de Corfou (The Lair of the Corfu Bandits) (1930)
22. La Prisonnière du Clocher (The Prisoner of the Bell Tower) (1930)
23. Sur la Piste d'Houdini (On the Trail of Houdini) (1930)
24. La Sautoir Volé ou Les Mystérieux Voleurs de Bijoux (The Stolen Necklace or The Mysterious Jewel Thieves) (1930)
25. Dans la Vienne Souterraine (In Underground Vienna) (1930)
26. Le Rajah Rouge (The Red Rajah) (1930) (Flax)
27. Le Bourreau de Londres (The Executioner of London) (1930) (Flax)
28. Le Roi des Contrebandiers d'Andorre (The King of the Andorra Smugglers) (1930)
29. La Malédiction des Walpole (The Curse of the Walpoles) (1930)
30. Une Fumerie d'Opium Parisienne (A Parisian Opium-Smoking Den) (1930)
31. Le Toréador de Grenade (The Toreador of Granada) (1930)
32. Le Musée des Horreurs (The Horror Museum) (1930)
33. Miss Mercédes, la Reine de l'Air (Miss Mercedes, Queen of the Air) (1931)
34. Le Docteur Criminel (The Criminal Doctor) (1931)
35. Sous le Poids d'une Forfaiture (The Burden of Betrayal) (1931)
36. Un Réveillon au Dragon Rouge (New Year's Eve at the Red Dragon) (1931)
37. L'Ermite du Marais du Diable (The Hermit of the Devil Swamp) (1931)
38. L'Intrigante Démasquée (The Schemer Unmasked) (1931)
39. Les Voleurs Volés ou Le Carnaval Tragique (The Stolen Thieves or Tragic Carnival) (1931)
40. Les Détrousseurs de Cadavres (The Corpse Robbers) (1931)
41. Autour d'un Trône (Around the Throne) (1931)
42. Une Nuit d'Épouvante au Château Royal (A Night of Terror at the Royal Castle) (1931)
43. Le Sosie d'Harry Dickson (Harry Dickson's Look-Alike) (1931)
44. L'Agence des Fausses Nouvelles (The Phony News Agency) (1931)
45. Le Double Crime ou La Montagne Sanglante (The Double Crime or The Bloody Mountain) (1931)
46. Le Crucifié (The Crucified Man) (1931)
47. Le Mauvais Génie du Cirque Angelo (The Evil Genius of Circus Angelo) (1931)
48. La Mystérieuse Maison du Lutteur (The Wrestler's Mysterious House) (1931)
49. Le Repaire de Palerme (The Lair of Palermo) (1931)
50. La Veuve Rouge (The Red Widow) (1931)
51. Une Bête Humaine (A Human Beast) (1931)
52. Le Signe de la Mort (The Sign of Death) (1931; rep. NéO 3)
53. Le Tripot Clandestin de Franklin Street (The Secret Speakeasy of Franklin Street) (1931)
54. La Fatale Ressemblance (Deadly Resemblance) (1931)
55. Le Gaz Empoisonné (The Poisoned Gas) (1931)
56. Le Pari Fatal (The Fatal Bet) (1931)
57. Les Feux Follets du Marais Rouge (The Fireflies of the Red Swamp) (1932)
58. Tom Wills, Femme de Chambre (Tom Wills, Chambermaid) (1932)
59. Les Treize Balles (The Thirteen Bullets) (1932)
60. Harry Dickson s'amuse (Harry Dickson Has Fun) (1932)
61. Joly, Chien Policier (Joly, Police Dog) (1932)
62. Les Voleurs de Femmes de Chinatown (The Girl Snatchers of Chinatown) (1932)
63. L'Effroyable Fiancé (The Awful Fiancé) (1932)
64. Le Trésor du Manoir de Streetham (The Treasure of Streetham Manor) (1932)
65. On a Volé un Homme (They Stole a Man) (1932)
66. Au Secours de la France (To Rescue France) (1932)
67. Le Fantôme des Ruines Rouges (The Phantom of the Red Ruins) (1932)
68. Les Vengeurs du Diable (The Devil's Avengers) (1932)
69. L'Étrange Lueur Verte (The Strange Green Light) (1932)
70. Le Secret de la Jeune Veuve (The Secret of the Young Widow) (1932)
71. L'Énigme du Tapis Vert (The Mystery of the Green Carpet) (1932)
72. La Fille de l'Usurier (The Usurer's Daughter) (1932)
73. Le Monstre Blanc (The White Monster) (1932)
74. Le Flair du Maître d'Hôtel (The Butler's Flair) (1932)
75. Le Mystère de la Vallée d'Argent (The Mystery of the Silver Valley) (1932)
76. Le Démon Pourpre (The Purple Devil) (1932)
77. Les Gardiens du Gouffre (The Guardians of the Pit) (1932)
78. Le Fiancé Disparu (The Missing Fiancé) (1932)
79. La Vie Criminelle de Lady Likeness (Lady Likeness' Criminal Life) (1932)
80. La Dame au Diamant Bleu (The Lady with The Blue Diamond) (1932)
81. Le Vampire aux Yeux Rouges (The Red-Eyed Vampire) (1933)
82. La Flèche Fantôme (The Phantom Arrow) (1933)
83. Les Trois Cercles de l'Épouvante (The Three Circles of Terror) (1933)
84. La Maison du Scorpion (The House of the Scorpion) (1933)
85. La Bande de l'Araignée (The Gang of the Spider) (1933)
86. Les Spectres-Bourreaux (The Ghost Executioners) (1933)
87. Le Mystère des Sept Fous (The Mystery of the Seven Madmen) (1933)
88. Les Étoiles de la Mort (The Stars of Death) (1933)
89. La Pierre de Lune (The Moonstone) (1933)
90. Le Mystère de la Forêt (The Mystery of the Forest) (1933)
91. L'Île de la Terreur (The Island of Terror) (1933)
92. La Maison Hantée de Fulham Road (The Haunted House of Fulham Road) (1933)
93. Le Temple de Fer (The Iron Temple) (1933)
94. La Chambre 113 (Room 113) (1933)
95. La Pieuvre Noire (The Black Octopus) (1933)
96. Le Singulier Mr. Hingle (The Strange Mr. Hingle) (1933)
97. Le Dieu Inconnu (The Unknown God) (1933)
98. Le Royaume Introuvable (The Hidden Kingdom) (1933)
99. Les Mystérieuses Études du Dr. Drumm (The Mysterious Studies of Dr. Drumm) (1933)
100. La Mort Bleue (The Blue Death) (1933)
101. Le Jardin des Furies (The Garden of the Furies) (1933)
102. Les Maudits de Heywood (The Accursed of Heywood) (1933)
103. ??Mystéras?? (1933)
104. La Cour d'Épouvante (The Court of Terror) (1933)
105. Le Roi de Minuit (The King of Midnight) (1934)
106. Le Chemin des Dieux (The Path of the Gods) (1934)
107. Blackwell, le Pirate de la Tamise (Blackwell, Pirate of the Thames) (1934)
108. Les Dentelles de la Reine (The Queen's Lace) (1934)
109. Le Sosie du Banquier (The Banker's Look-Alike) (1934)
110. Le Trésor du Marchand d'Esclaves (The Treasure of the Slave Merchant) (1934)
111. Les Blachclaver (1934)
112. Le Fantôme du Juif Errant (The Ghost of the Wandering Jew) (1934)
113. Messire l'Anguille (Sir Eel) (1934)
114. Le Châtiment des Foyle (The Punishment of the Foyles) (1934)
115. La Grande Ombre (The Great Shadow) (1934)
116. Les Eaux Infernales (The Infernal Waters) (1934)
117. Le Vampire qui Chante (The Singing Vampire) (1934)
118. Le Mystère de Bantam House (The Mystery of Bantam House) (1934)
119. La Cigogne Bleue (The Blue Stork) (1934)
120. Ce Paradis de Flower Dale (That Paradise of Flower Dale) (1934)
121. L'Esprit du Feu (The Fire Spirit) (1934)
122. Turckle-le-Noir (Turckle-The-Black) (1934)
123. Les Yeux de la Lune (The Eyes of the Moon) (1934)
124. L'Île de Mr. Rocamir (The Island of Mr. Rocamir) (1934)
125. X-4 (1934)
126. La Maison des Hallucinations (The House of Hallucinations) (1934)
127. Le Signe des Triangles (The Sign of the Triangles) (1934)
128. L'Hôtel des Trois Pèlerins (The Hotel of the Three Pilgrims) (1934)
129. La Menace de Khâli (The Threat of Khâli)
130. Les Illustres Fils du Zodiaque (The Illustrious Sons of the Zodiac) (1935)
131. Le Spectre de Mr. Biedermeyer (The Ghost of Mr. Biedermeyer) (1935)
132. La Voiture Démoniaque (The Devil Car) (1935)
133. L'Aventure d'un Soir (An Evening's Adventure) (1935)
134. Le Dancing de l'Épouvante (The Night Club of Terror) (1935)
135. Les Plus Difficiles de mes Causes (My Most Difficult Cases) (1935)
136. L'Homme au Mousquet (The Man With the Musket) (1935)
137. Le Savant Invisible (The Invisible Scientist) (1935)
138. Le Diable au Village (The Devil In the Village) (1935)
139. Le Cabinet du Dr. Selles (The Surgery of Dr. Selles) (1935)
140. Le Loup-Garou (The Werewolf) (1935)
141. L'Étoile à Sept Branches (The Seven-Pointed Star) (1935)
142. Le Monstre dans la Neige (The Snow Monster) (1935)
143. Le Cas de Sir Evans (The Case of Sir Evans) (1935)
144. La Maison du Grand Péril (The House of the Great Peril) (1935)
145. Les Tableaux Hantés (The Haunted Paintings) (1935)
146. Cric-Croc, le Mort en Habit (Cric-Croc, The Walking Dead) (1935)
147. Le Lit du Diable (The Devil's Bed) (1935)
148. L'Affaire Bardouillet (The Bardouillet Case) (1935)
149. La Statue Assassinée (The Murdered Statue) (1935)
150. Les Effroyables (The Frightful Ones) (1935)
151. L'Homme au Masque d'Argent (The Man In the Silver Mask) (1936)
152. Les Sept Petites Chaises (The Seven Little Chairs) (1936)
153. La Conspiration Fantastique (The Fantastic Conspiracy) (1936)
154. La Tente aux Mystères (The Tent of Mysteries) (1936)
155. Le Véritable Secret du Palmer Hotel (The True Secret of the Palmer Hotel) (1936)
156. Le Mystère Malais (A Malaysian Mystery) (1936)
157. Le Mystère du Moustique Bleu (The Mystery of the Blue Mosquito) (1936)
158. L'Énigmatique Tiger Brand (The Enigmatic Tiger Brand) (1936)
159. La Mitrailleuse Musgrave (The Musgrave Machine Gun) (1936)
160. Les Nuits Effrayantes de Felston (The Frightful Nights of Felston) (1936)
161. Les Vingt-Quatre Heures Prodigieuses (The Prodigious 24 Hours) (1936)
162. Dans les Griffes de l'Idole Noire (In The Clutches of the Black Idol) (1936)
163. La Résurrection de la Gorgone (The Resurrection of the Gorgon) (1937)
164. La Cité de l'Étrange Peur (The City of The Strange Fear) (1937)
165. Les Énigmes de la Maison Rules (The Enigmas of Rules House) (1937)
166. Le Studio Rouge (The Red Studio) (1937)
167. La Terrible Nuit du Zoo (The Dreadful Night of the Zoo) (1937)
168. La Disparition de Mr. Byslop (The Disappearance of Mr. Byslop) (1937)
169. Les Momies Évanouies (The Vanished Mummies) (1937)
170. L'Aventure Espagnole (The Spanish Adventure) (1937)
171. La Tête à Deux Sous (The Two-Pennies Head) (1937)
172. Le Fauteuil 27 (Seat 27) (1937)
173. L'Affaire du Pingouin (The Penguin Affair) (1937)
174. La Nuit du Marécage (The Night of the Swamp) (1937)
175. On A Tué Mr. Parkinson (They Killed Mr. Parkinson) (1938)
176. La Rue de la Tête Perdue (The Street of the Missing Head) (1938)
177. L'Énigme du Sphinx (The Sphinx Enigma) (1938)
178. Usines de Mort (Death Factories) (1938)

Jean Ray's exact contribution to the Harry Dickson series is impossible to determine accurately, but all experts agree that he wrote or substantially rewrote all issues written from 1933 onward, and a number of issues published in 1932. There has been done substantial research bij the Vriendenkring Jean Ray / L'Amicale Jean Ray, who are re-publishing all Harry Dicksons written by Jean Ray in facsimile.

== Bibliography (in English) ==
Episodes 81, 93, 152, and 163 were translated into English by Jean-Marc Lofficier & Randy Lofficier and collected in Harry Dickson: The Heir of Dracula (2009) Black Coat Press, ISBN 978-1-934543-90-0. The husband-and-wife team followed this collection up with Harry Dickson: The Werewolf of Rutherford Grange (2011), Harry Dickson vs. The Spider (2014), Harry Dickson: The Man in Grey (2014), Tenebras (2016), Harry Dickson Vs. Mysteras (2021), Harry Dickson: Krik-Krok The Walking Dead (2022).

Harry Dickson: The Werewolf of Rutherford Grange contains episode #141, Harry Dickson vs. The Spider contains episodes #85 and 86, Harry Dickson Vs. Mysteras contains episodes #103, 104, 106, and 147.

Harry Dickson: The Man in Grey and Tenebras are translations of Arnould Galopin's works.

== Pastiches ==
- In 1996, Editions Fleuve Noir published Les Exploits d'Harry Dickson by Gérard Dôle, No. 29 in their SuperPoche imprint, an omnibus paperback reprinting a series of short stories.
- Harry Dickson has appeared in stories published in Tales of the Shadowmen
- Brice Tarvel wrote Les Dossiers Secrets de Harry Dickson (Harry Dickson's Secret Files) for Editions Malpertuis in 2009
- Also in 2009, Belgian publisher L'Âge d'or released Harry Dickson - Aventures Inconnues [Unknown Adventures] by Yves Varende, a collection of four, previously untranslated Harry Dickson stories taken from the original German/Dutch editions, adapted and retold into French by Varende.

== Comics ==
=== Published by Dargaud ===
Free adaptations written by Christian Vanderhaeghe; drawn by Pascal J. Zanon.

1. La Bande de l'Araignée (1986)
2. Les Spectres Bourreaux (1988)
3. Les Trois Cercles de l'Épouvante (1990)
4. Le Royaume Introuvable (1994)
5. L'Étrange Lueur Verte (1997)
6. La Conspiration Fantastique (1999)
7. Echec au Roi (2002)
8. Le Temple de Fer (2003)

=== Published by Soleil ===
New stories written by Richard Nolane; drawn by Olivier Roman.

1. L'île des Possédés (1992)
2. Le Démon de Whitechapel (1994)
3. Les Amis de l'Enfer (1995)
4. L'Ombre de Blackfield (1996)
5. La Nuit du Météore (1998)
6. La Terreur Jaune (2000)
7. Les Loups de Darkhenge (2001)
8. Le Sanctuaire du Grand Ancien (2002)
9. Le Secret de Raspoutine (2003)
10. La Sorciere du Kent (2004)
11. Le diable du Devonshire (2008)
12. Le semeur d'angoisse (2005)
13. L'héritage maudit de Rennes-le-Château (2009, 2014)

=== Published by Dupuis ===
Adaptations written by Doug Headline and Luana Vergari; drawn by Onofrio Catacchio.

1. Mysteras (2023)
2. La cour d'épouvante (2024)

== Others ==
Filmmaker Alain Resnais tried, unsuccessfully, to get a live-action Harry Dickson feature off the ground in the 1960s. The script has been published in a book title "Les aventures de Harry Dickson, scénario pour un film (non-réalisé) par Alain Resnais de Frédéric Towarnicki" - Capricci Editions - Paris décembre 2007

The first Harry Dickson novel translated into English

== Literature ==
- Hardy P., Institute B.F., ed. (1997). The BFI Companion to Crime. Film Studies. Cassell. p. 285. ISBN 9780304332151.
