= Zatanna (comic book) =

Comic book series featuring Zatanna

- Cover of Zatanna vol. 2 #1 (July 2010), art by Stéphane Roux

Publication information
- Publisher: DC Comics
- Schedule: Monthly
- Format: (vol. 1, 3); Limited series (vol. 2, 4); Ongoing series
- Genre: Superhero
- Publication date: (vol. 1); May 1993 – August 1993 (vol. 2); May 2010 – August 2011 (vol. 3); February 2025 – July 2025 (vol. 4); April 2026 – present
- No. of issues: (vol. 1): 4 (vol. 2): 16 (vol. 3): 6 (vol. 4): 1

Creative team
- Written by: (vol. 1); Lee Marrs (vol. 2); Paul Dini; Adam Beechen (#15-16) (vol. 3-4); Jamal Campbell
- Penciller: List: (vol. 1) Esteban Maroto (vol. 2) Stéphane Roux Chad Hardin Jamal Igle (#10) Cliff Chiang (#12) (vol. 3-4) Jamal Campbell
- Inker: List: (vol. 1) Esteban Maroto (vol. 2) Stéphane Roux John Kalisz Chad Hardin Wayne Faucher (#10) (vol. 3-4) Jamal Campbell

Collected editions
- Zatanna: The Mistress of Magic: ISBN 978-1401230074
- Zatanna: Shades of the Past: ISBN 978-1401233006
- Zatanna by Paul Dini: ISBN 978-1401268824

Zatanna is a series of American comic book featuring the eponymous superhero of the same name, created by screenwriter Paul Dini and French artist Stéphane Roux. The first series was originally published as a limited series in 1994, following with a spin-off and a second ongoing series which launched in July 2010. The second ongoing series ran for 16 issues, ending in October 2011 due to the New 52 reboot. In addition to comic titles taking place in mainstream DC Universe, several other Zatanna series also takes places in various Elseworlds.

The second series received mostly positive reviews, with critics praising it as "quirky and fun" and commending the artwork. Issue #1 became one of DC's best-selling comics of 2010 and was reprinted in July of that year after selling out. The collected volumes also achieved strong sales, consistently ranking in the top 100 best-seller lists.

== Publication history ==
The second, ongoing series was originally conceived as a project in 2007, but Paul Dini delayed it until 2010 due to other commitments and a desire to work with Zatanna when the timing felt right for him. The series explores Zatanna's background, illustrating how she navigates her various responsibilities while managing the burdens they bring. Set in the fictional DC Universe, the plot introduces both new characters created specifically for the saga and iconic figures from the publisher's history, as it recounts the magician and heroine's adventures. The comic also delves into Zatanna's more everyday life, highlighting her work as an illusionist beyond her world-saving efforts.

== Print media ==
=== Limited series ===
==== Zatanna (1993) ====
No	Title	Release date
1.	"Come Together; I"	July, 1993
2.	"Come Together; II"	August, 1993
3.	"Come Together; III"	September, 1993
4.	"Come Together; IV"	October, 1993

==== Zatanna: Bring Down the House (2024) ====
No	Title	Release date	Notes
1.	"Book One"	June 25, 2024	DC Black Label imprint
2.	"Book Two"	July 24, 2024	DC Black Label imprint
3.	"Book Three"	August 28, 2024	DC Black Label imprint

==== Zatanna (2025) ====
No	Title	Release date
1.	"A Tilnoom Edalb"	February 2025
2.	"Dellup Rednu"	March 2025
3.	"A Thgin Fo Ssol"	April 2025
4.	"Eht Niatruc Sllaf"	May 2025
5.	"Dniheb Eht Sniatruc"	June 2025
6.	"S'ti Emitwohs!"	July 2025

=== Ongoing series ===
==== Zatanna (2010–2011) ====
No	Title	Release date
1.	"The First Story"	May, 2010
2.	"Fuseli's Nightmare"	June, 2010
3.	"Night on Devil Mountain"	July, 2010
4.	"Playing With Cards"	August, 2010
5.	"Double or Nothing"	September, 2010
6.	"Married in Vegas"	October 27, 2010
Plot synopsis
Detective Dale Colton of the SFPD enlists Zatanna to investigate a paranormal murder, leading her to confront Brother Night, a mystic crime boss aiming to expand his territory. After Zatanna threatens his operations, Night unleashes dream demon Fuseli against her. When that fails, he targets her stage crew and uses the spirit of her father, Giovanni Zatara, as a weapon. Zatanna liberates Giovanni from Night's control and defeats him, breaking his hold on the souls that empowered him. Soon after, Zatanna helps Sonny Raymond, a casino owner with ties to her father, after a robbery by the Royal Flush Gang. However, Sonny poisons her, revealing he is actually Benjamin Raymond, who has extended his life by trading the souls of his coerced wives to Lord Mammon, a wealthy demon. Planning to do the same to Zatanna, he is thwarted by Zach Zatara. To prevent Benjamin's supernatural punishment and appease Mammon, Zatanna transforms him into a lump of gold. The first six issues of the ongoing series are re-printed under the Zatanna: The Mistress of Magic collected edition.
No	Title	Release date
7.	"Shades"	November 17, 2010
8.	"Pupaphobia"	December 22, 2010
9	"Stringleshanks" / Zatanna: Junior Sorceress: "Brace Yourself"	January 26, 2011
10.	"Strung Along"	February 9. 2011
11.	"Unstrung"	March 30, 2011
12.	"SymmetryγɿɟɘммγƧ"	April, 2011
Plot synopsis
At Hollywood's Magic Museum, Zatanna confronts the residual magic of Sargon the Sorcerer. She also attends therapy to address her fear of puppets and recalls her Oscar Hampel, an animated marionette who claims her father cursed him. Zatanna uncovers his deceit, revealing him as a murderous puppeteer who became a children's show star until Giovanni's fame eclipsed his. Desperate, he resorted to theft and violence, ultimately taking young Zatanna hostage, which led Giovanni to curse him as punishment. Though Giovanni wiped the traumatized Zatanna's memory of the event, she repressed the trauma, manifesting as nightmares and a fear of puppets. Oscar's actions turn her into a puppet, but her stage crew member, Mikey, rescues her and Zatanna seals him. The ordeal revealed her father's manipulation of her mind was the root cause of her fear. Afterwards she confronts and uses palindromes to defeat Backlash, a redneck villain powered by a fairy capable of manipulating time to his advantage. In the "Zatanna: Junior Sorceress: Brace Yourself" backup, a young Zatanna captures a murderer despite wearing braces and using a Speak and Spell. Issues 7-12 were re-printed in the Zatanna: Shades of the Past collected edition.

=== Collected editions ===
Title	ISBN	Materials collected	Release date	Ref
Zatanna: The Mistress of Magic	978-1401230074	Zatanna #1–6	March 2011	
Zatanna: Shades of the Past	978-1401233006	Zatanna #7–12	November 2011	
Zatanna by Paul Dini	978-1401268824	Zatanna #1–16, Zatanna: Everyday Magic, DC Universe Rebirth Holiday Special, DC Infinite Halloween Special	March 2017	
Elseworlds
Title	ISBN	Release date	Ref	
Zatanna and the House of Secrets	978-1401290702	2020		
Zatanna and the Ripper Vol. 1	978-1779523389	October 3, 2023		

== Reception ==
Andy Frisk from Comic Book Bin rated the first issue of the series 7.5 out of 10 stars and described Stéphane Roux's work as "very solid and smooth." Zack Little from Inside Pulse thought Jamal Igle's drawing style was "good," noting that his technique's best feature was "the attention he pays to detail." He also mentioned in his review of issue eleven that the characters Mikey Dowling and Brother Night were "the main attraction of the volume" and a "little bundle of suspense", respectively. Greg McElhatton of Comic Book Resources positively reviewed the first issue of Zatanna, finding it "enjoyable", and praised the way Paul Dini depicted Zatanna's daily life. He also referred to Roux and Karl Story's artistic work as "beautiful and exciting".

=== Sales and recognitions ===
The series generally sold well, frequently reaching the top 100 best-selling comics in the United States. The first issue became a DC Comics best-seller in May 2010. After selling out, it was reprinted in July of that year. Issue #3 ranked at number 72 on the Top 100 best-sellers list for July 2010, while Issue #4 climbed to number 67 the following month and maintained that position on the Top 300. By May 2011, Issue #13 had sold over 18,000 copies, ranking it number 100 in demand. According to Diamond Comic Distributors. Zatanna: Mistress of Magic was the eleventh best-selling comic in its compilation volume category for March 2011, and Zatanna: Shades of The Past ranked number forty-four.
