= Hexagon Comics =

French publisher

- Predecessor: Éditions Lug; Semic Comics
- Founded: 2004; 21 years ago
- Founders: Luciano Bernasconi
- Country of origin: France, United States
- Key people: Jean-Marc Lofficier
- Publication types: Comic books
- Fiction genres: Superheroes, Adventure
- Imprints: Black Coat Press
- Owner(s): Hollywood Comics

Hexagon Comics is a syndicate of French, Italian and Spanish comic book writers and artists formed in early 2004, after French publisher Semic Comics decided to cancel its line of comic books.

Taking advantage of European copyright laws, these writers and artists got together, reclaimed the rights to the more than 300 characters they had created for Éditions Lug, Semic Comics' predecessor, and reorganized under the banner of Hexagon Comics. Among these are Zembla, Jed Puma, Drago, Dragut, Rakar, Baroud, Wampus, Jaleb, Jaydee, Homicron, Brigade Temporelle, C.L.A.S.H., Sibilla, Phenix, Starlock, Kabur, Waki, etc.

Since 2006, Hexagon Comics has been releasing a number of books in English — primarily translated by Jean-Marc Lofficier — through its affiliated company, Black Coat Press.

In France, starting in May 2010, Hexagon Comics launched a series of monthly, 500-plus-page trade paperbacks reprinting classic stories from its library, as well as launching three 48-page comic-book series: Strangers, Strangers Universe and Le Garde Républicain.

== English titles ==
- Wampus (2006) ISBN 978-1-932983-61-6
- C.L.A.S.H. (2006) ISBN 978-1-932983-62-3
- Phenix (2006) ISBN 978-1-932983-63-0
- Kabur (2006) ISBN 978-1-932983-83-8
- Zembla (2007) ISBN 978-1-932983-93-7
- Strangers Origins: Homicron (2008) ISBN 978-1-934543-10-8
- Strangers Origins: Jaydee (2009) ISBN 978-1-934543-42-9
- Strangers Origins: Starlock (2009) ISBN 978-1-934543-65-8
- Hexagon: Dark Matter (prose novel) (2013) ISBN 978-1-61227-154-5
- Guardian of the Republic #1 (2014) ISBN 978-1-61227-242-9
- Strangers 1: Strangers in a Strange Land (2014) ISBN 978-1-61227-299-3
- Strangers 0: Omens & Origins (2015) ISBN 978-1-61227-396-9
- Bob Lance 1: The Round Table
- Bob Lance 2: To Seek the Holy Grail
- Bob Lance 3: The Ghost of Rasputin
- Tales of the Twilight People: Dr. Despair
- The Time Brigade: The Grail Wars
- Tiger & The Eye

== French titles ==
=== Trade paperback reprints of classic stories ===
- Wampus (Tome 1) ISBN 978-1-935558-50-7
- Wampus (Tome 2) ISBN 978-1-935558-51-4
- Strangers: Homicron/Jayde (Tome 1) ISBN 978-1-935558-57-6
- Strangers: Starlock/Jaleb (Tome 2) ISBN 978-1-935558-58-3
- Strangers: Tanka/CLASH (Tome 3) ISBN 978-1-935558-66-8
- Strangers: Jaleb (Tome 4) ISBN 978-1-935558-85-9
- Phénix (Tome 1) ISBN 978-1-935558-75-0
- Phénix à Paris (Tome 2) ISBN 978-1-61227-008-1
- Hexagon (Tome 1) ISBN 978-1-61227-029-6
- Hexagon (Tome 2) ISBN 978-1-61227-043-2
- Hexagon (Tome 3) ISBN 978-1-61227-064-7
- La Saga de Kabur ISBN 978-1-61227-048-7
- Brigade Temporelle (Tome 1) ISBN 978-1-61227-072-2
- Brigade Temporelle (Tome 2) ISBN 978-1-61227-077-7
- Les Exploits de Dragut ISBN 978-1-61227-092-0
- Kit Kappa ISBN 978-1-61227-093-7
- Comte de Saint-Germain ISBN 978-1-61227-103-3
- Ozark ISBN 978-1-61227-124-8
- Zembla (Tome 1) ISBN 978-1-61227-126-2
- Les Rois des Profondeurs (Tome 1) ISBN 978-1612271309
- Les Rois des Profondeurs (Tome 2) ISBN 978-1-61227-146-0
- Kidz (Tome 1) ISBN 978-1-61227-149-1
- Kidz (Tome 2) ISBN 978-1-61227-164-4
- Kidz (Tome 3) ISBN 978-1-61227-171-2
- Kidz (Tome 4) ISBN 978-1-61227-183-5
- Galaor ISBN 978-1-61227-158-3
- Ben Léonard ISBN 978-1-61227-158-3
- Frank Universal du Wold Safety Unit ISBN 978-1-61227-197-2
- Chevaliers de l'Espace ISBN 978-1-61227-206-1
- L'Etoile à 5 Branches ISBN 978-1-61227-215-3
- Lucifer ISBN 978-1-61227-224-5
- Gallix ISBN 978-1-61227-227-6
- Dick Demon - Stormalong ISBN 978-1-61227-236-8
- Le Gladiateur de Bronze ISBN 978-1-61227-235-1
- Agence Thunderbolt ISBN 978-1-61227-250-4
- Zembla (Tome 2) ISBN 978-1-61227-251-1
- Larry Cannon ISBN 978-1-61227-260-3
- Sergent Cannon ISBN 978-1-61227-266-5
- Jed Puma ISBN 978-1-61227-277-1
- Baroud ISBN 978-1-61227-286-3
- Drago ISBN 978-1-61227-310-5
- Bob Lance (Tome 1) ISBN 978-1-61227-318-1
- Bob Lance (Tome 2) ISBN 978-1-61227-325-9
- Bob Lance (Tome 3) ISBN 978-1-61227-341-9
- Gun Gallon ISBN 978-1-61227-332-7
- Zembla (Tome 3) ISBN 978-1-61227-296-2
- Afrikanders ISBN 978-1-61227-347-1
- Le Chat
- Dick Spade / Dave Kaplan
- Champagne
- L'Epervier
- Ricky Rox
- X-101
- Corsak
- Apollon
- Jean Brume
- Le Prince de la Nuit
- Zembla Tome 4
- Billy Boyd
- Rakar
- Galton & Trumbo
- Lone Bardo
- Brigade As
- Viking
- Zapo
- Flag des Neiges
- Utopie
- Johnny Bourask Tome 1
- Johnny Bourask Tome 2
- Johnny Bourask Tome 3
- Zembla Tome 5
- Gun Gallon Tome 2
- Ivan Karine
- Bill & Barry
- Jacky West
- Jed Puma Tome 2
- Luc le Clandestin
- Capitaine Tiger
- Gun Gallon Tome 3
- Tocard Gang Tome 1
- Tocard Gang Tome 2
- Zembla Tome 6
- Baroud Tome 2
- Drago Tome 2
- Waki
- Gun Gallon Tome 4
- Gun Gallon Tome 5
- Flambo * Tirtouche Tome 1
- Flambo * Tirtouche Tome 2

=== Color reprints of modern-day stories ===
- Dick Demon: Point de Chute (hardcover) ISBN 978-1-61227-196-5
- Kabur: L'Etoile Rouge (hardcover) ISBN 978-1-61227-196-5
- Strangers 0: Presages & Prologues (tpb) ISBN 978-1-61227-255-9
- Strangers 1: Etrangers en Terre Etrangere (tpb) ISBN 978-1-61227-193-4
- Strangers 2: Des Dieux et des Hommes (tpb) ISBN 978-1-61227-194-1
- Dragut: Bouche Rouge

=== Comic books ===
==== Le Garde Republicain (color) ====
- #1 ISBN 978-1-61227-241-2
- #2-A ISBN 978-1-61227-186-6
- #2-B ISBN 978-1-61227-195-8
- Les Partisans (b&w) ISBN 978-1-61227-267-2
- #3-A ISBN 978-1-61227-300-6
- #3-B ISBN 978-1-61227-301-3
- Special Noel 2014-A (b&w) (with Le Prince de la Nuit) ISBN 978-1-61227-353-2
- Special Noel 2014-B (b&w) (with Kit Kappa) ISBN 978-1-61227-354-9
- #4-A
- #4-B
- #5-A
- #5-B
- Special Noel 2015 (b&w) (with Dragut, Bouche Rouge, Brigade Temporelle)
- #6-A
- #6-B
- #7-A
- #7-B
- Special Noel 2016 (b&w) (with Hexagon)
- #8-A
- #8-B
- #9-A
- #9-B
- #10-A
- #10-B
- Special Noel 2017 (b&w) (with Comte de Saint-Germain)
- Special Vacances 2018 (b&w) (with Phénix, Super-Patriotes)

==== Strangers Saison 3 (black-and-white) ====
- #1 ISBN 978-1-61227-261-0
- #2 ISBN 978-1-61227-262-7
- #3 ISBN 978-1-61227-263-4
- #4 ISBN 978-1-61227-291-7
- #5 ISBN 978-1-61227-307-5
- #6 ISBN 978-1-61227-311-2
- #7 ISBN 978-1-61227-327-3
- #8 ISBN 978-1-61227-331-0
- #9 ISBN 978-1-61227-340-2
- #10 ISBN 978-1-61227-356-3
- #11 ISBN 978-1-61227-357-0
- #12
- #13
- #14
- #15
- #16
- #17
- #18

==== Strangers Saison 4 (b&w) ====
- #1
- #2
- #3
- #4
- #5
- #6
- #7
- #8

==== Strangers Saison 5 (b&w) ====
- #1
- #2
- #3
- #4
- #5
- #6
- #7
- #8
- #9
- #10
- #11
- #12
- #13
- #14

==== Strangers Universe (color) ====
- #1 Zembla/Kabur (Tome 1) ISBN 978-1-61227-377-8
- #2 Zembla/Kabur (Tome 2) ISBN 978-1-61227-140-8
- #3 Starlock/Homicron ISBN 978-1-61227-141-5
- #4 Galaor/Futura ISBN 978-1-61227-158-3
- #5 Garde Republicain/Jean Brume ISBN 978-1-61227-185-9
- #6 Gladiateur de Bronze
- #7 Brigade Temporelle
- #8 Phénix

==== Les Nouvelles Aventures de Zembla (b&w) ====
- #1
- #2
- #3

==== Misc. (b&w) ====
- Hexagon: La Ruche Noire
- Scarlet Lips: Crimson Dawn
- Le Dossier Homicron
- Kidz: Origions

=== Prose books ===
- Hexagon 1: Matiere Noire (novel) ISBN 978-1-61227-111-8
- Dimension Super-Heros (Tome 1) (anthology) ISBN 978-1-61227-060-9
- Hexagon 2: La Guerre des Immortels (novel) ISBN 978-1-61227-219-1
- Dimension Super-Heros (Tome 2) (anthology) ISBN 978-1-61227-173-6
- Sibilla: Cercles Mortels
- Barry Barrison et L'Héritage de Tarford Castle
- Dimension Super-Heros (Tome 3)
