= Arnould Galopin =

French writer (1865–1934)

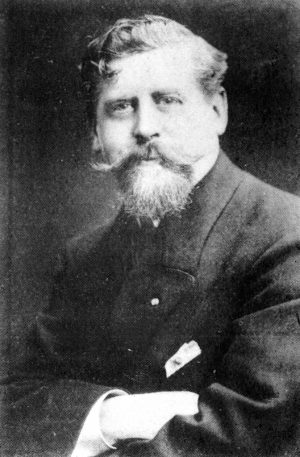
Arnould Galopin

Arnould Galopin (1865, Marbeuf, Eure - 1934) was a prolific French writer with more than 50 novels to his credit. Galopin won the French Academy's Grand Prize for his Sur le Front de Mer (1918), a critically acclaimed novel about the Merchant Navy during World War I, and wrote several equally acclaimed novels about his experiences during the war.

Galopin also wrote a number of science fiction novels in the Jules Verne and H. G. Wells style, including the remarkable Doctor Omega (1906), La Révolution de Demain (Tomorrow's Revolution) (1909) and Le Bacille (1928), an uncannily prophetic tale of a mad scientist who uses biological warfare for revenge.

He also penned numerous young adult novels such as Le Tour du Monde de Deux Gosses (Two Kids Around The World) (1908) and Un Aviateur de 15 ans (A 15-Year Old Aviator) (1926).

Finally, Galopin was the creator of Ténébras, the Phantom Bandit, a rival of Fantômas, and of the fictional detective Allan Dickson, one of the possible prototypes for the more famous Harry Dickson. Galopin had Dickson team up with Sherlock Holmes in L'Homme au Complet Gris (The Man in Grey) (1912), one of the first French Holmesian pastiches.
