= Harnois =

Harnois is a surname. Notable people with the surname include:

- Pauline Georgette Harnois, wife of Rene Gagnon
- Elisabeth Harnois (born 1979/1980), American actress
- Marlène Harnois (born 1986), French taekwondo practitioner
- Rolland Harnois Founder of Les Industries Harnois inc
