= Éditions Lug =

French comics publisher

- Founded: 1950; 75 years ago
- Founders: Marcel Navarro and Auguste Vistel
- Defunct: Jan 1989; acquired by Semic Group / Semic Press
- Successor: Semic Comics
- Country of origin: France
- Headquarters location: (1950–1956) 10, rue Bellecordière, Lyon (from 1956) 6, Rue Émile-Zola, Lyon
- Key people: Claude Vistel, Luciano Bernasconi, Roger Médina
- Publication types: Comic books (reprints, translations, original stories)
- Fiction genres: Adventure, war, superheroes

Éditions Lug (French: [lyg]) was a French comic book publisher based in Lyon, operating from 1950 to 1989. Originally known for publishing digest-sized reprints of old French and Italian comics, it then created its own characters and titles, such as the Tarzanesque Zembla. Later, Lug began licensing and publishing translated versions of Marvel Comics superhero comics with titles such as Fantask, Marvel, and most notably, Strange.

In 1989, the company was acquired by the Semic Group, a Scandinavian comic book publisher, and later became a French company, Semic Comics.

== History ==
=== Origins ===
Éditions Lug was created in 1950 by writer/editor Marcel Navarro and businessman Auguste Vistel. The name of the company came from Lugdunum, the Gallo-Roman name for the city of Lyon.

When it started, Éditions Lug only reprinted old French and Italian comics in digest-sized magazines.

Among its most popular Italian imports were:

- Tex Willer (which it began publishing in 1951, then moved to its eponymous magazine in 1952), from Sergio Bonelli Editore
- Il Grande Blek (which it began publishing in Kiwi in 1955)
- Capitan Miki (which it began publishing in Nevada in 1958)
- Alan Mistero (renamed Ombrax) (which it began publishing in an eponymous magazine in 1967)

The latter three are from Studio EsseGesse.

Another notable non-French comic book series published by Éditions Lug at the time was Dan Dare (in 1962).

=== Original characters ===
Early on, however, Navarro decided that his company needed some original characters. He enlisted a number of French and Italian studios to script and draw original series and began experimenting with a wide variety of genres. The look of these series was often evocative of 1960s DC Comics.

Éditions Lug's first major original success was a Tarzanesque jungle lord named Zembla (1963); its eponymous title was an immediate hit. Among other notable characters created at the times were Rakar, a masked Lakota chief; Tanka, another jungle lord; Gun Gallon, a John Carter of Mars-type hero lost on a parallel world with three moons; World War II hero Rick Ross, aka Baroud; kung-fu cowboy Jed Puma; Barbary Coast corsair Dragut; and superhero Pilote Noir.

=== Marvel Comics / superheroes ===
In 1968, Claude Vistel, Auguste Vistel's daughter, returned from a trip to New York and convinced Navarro to publish the first translations of Marvel Comics in France, in a magazine titled Fantask (1969), which featured Fantastic Four, Spider-Man and the Silver Surfer.

Sensing that he was on to something, Navarro followed suit with his own creations. Wampus was launched the same year; it featured the eponymous alien monster sent by an evil cosmic intelligence to destroy the Earth, and the exploits of a S.H.I.E.L.D.-like organization named C.L.A.S.H.. Unfortunately, Éditions Lug had run-ins with French censorship, and both Fantask and Wampus were canceled after only six issues.

The following year, Navarro re-launched the Marvel characters, first in a magazine called Strange, then in Marvel (which also fell victim to censorship a year later). At the same time, he continued to introduce more new French characters in magazines such as:

- Futura (1972), which published Jaleb, Homicron, Brigade Temporelle, L'Autre (The Other, a toned-down version of Wampus), Aster, Jeff Sullivan and Sibilla
- Waki (1974)
- Kabur which also published Le Gladiateur de Bronze (The Bronze Gladiator) (1975).

Throughout this period, Luciano Bernasconi became one of Éditions Lug's major artists, co-creating a number of major characters, such as Wampus, Kabur and Phenix.

=== 1970s/1980s success ===
The late 1970s and early 1980s were arguably the best years of the company. Its line of French-language Marvel editions thrived with titles such as Titans (1976), Nova (1978), Spidey (1979), and graphic novels of The Fantastic Four (1973), Conan the Barbarian (1976), etc.

A number of original titles were added, including a revamped version of Mustang (1980), which published Photonik, Mikros and Ozark. Other characters introduced during this period included Phenix (1978) and Starlock (1980). It even licensed its own creations to Spanish and Italian companies, where they sold with great success.

Around this time, a shared universe began to emerge. It wasn't nearly as tightly integrated as the Marvel Universe. While the titles made references to each other, characters from different titles never interacted directly.

=== Acquisition by Semic Press ===
In the mid-80's, Auguste Vistel died. This was the beginning of the end for Éditions Lug. Eventually, Marcel Navarro chose to retire. In 1989, the company was sold to the Semic Group, a Scandinavian comic book publisher, which renamed it Semic France. It later became a French company, Semic Comics.

== Hexagon Comics ==
In 2004, after Semic Comics decided to cancel the Éditions Lug lines of comic books, a syndicate of French, Italian, and Spanish former Lug writers and artists reclaimed the rights to their characters and reorganized under the banner of Hexagon Comics.

== Selected titles ==
- Plutos (1950)
- Rodeo (1951)
- Tex (1952)
- Pipo (1952)
- Pampa (1954)
- Kiwi (1955)
- Pim Pam Poum (1955) (French edition of the Katzenjammer Kids)
- Hondo (1956)
- Nevada (1958)
- Flambo (1959)
- Bourask (1960)
- Yuma (1962)
- Zembla (1963)
- Blek (1963)
- Bronco (1966)
- Baroud (1966)
- Dago (1966)
- Ombrax (1966)
- Mustang (1966)
- Fantask (1969)
- Wampus (1969)
- Strange (1970)
- Marvel (1971)
- Futura (1972)
- Yampa (1973)
- Waki (1974)
- Kabur (1975)
- Titans (1976)
- Nova (1978)
- Spidey (1979)

== Selected characters ==
- Afrikanders, Boer War adventures
- Agent Sans Nom, espionage
- Ami Barry, ghost detective
- Antonin, Musketeer adventures
- Apollo, western adventures
- Archie, eccentric scientist
- Aster, science fiction
- L'Autre, toned down sequel to Wampus
- Babette, young fashion model adventures
- Barefoot le Magnifique, French-Indian wars adventures
- Baroud, WWII adventures
- Bathy-09, underwater adventures
- Ben Leonard, archeological, science fiction adventures
- Benny du Bayou, growing up in Louisiana
- Bill & Barry, a boy looking for his parents
- Billy Boyd, western
- Bob Lance, modern-days descendants of the Round Table
- Bob Pepper, insurance investigations
- Bob Stanley, an American in 19th century Japan
- Brigade As, Interpol adventures
- Brigade Temporelle, time travel adventures
- Capitaine Giroflée
- Captain Tiger, Polynesian adventures
- Captain Tom & Co.
- Le Chat, international boxing
- Champagne
- Chevalier de l'Espace, science fiction
- Chikotawa, Canadian adventures
- C.L.A.S.H.
- Comte de Saint-Germain
- Corsak, jungle lord
- Dago, supernatural western
- Dan Diamond, espionage
- Dan Lucky, western
- Dan Sabre, western
- Dan Tempest, western
- Dave Kaplan, news photographer
- Dick Demon, supernatural western
- Dick Spade, journalist
- Digger Drake, India under the Raj
- Doc Sullivan, medical adventures
- Don Juan l'Epervier, swashbuckler
- Dragut, pirate
- Etoile à Cinq Branches, supernatural adventures
- Face d'Ange, espionage
- Fargo Jim, western
- Flag des Neiges, Mountain rescue adventures
- Flambo, Napoleon's Little Drummer
- Flanagan, detective
- Frank Ale, boxing adventures
- Frank Universal, ecological science fiction
- Fred & Gib, western
- Frères Thunderbolt, private eyes
- Fury, Korean War
- Galaor, sword & sorcery
- Gallix, heroic fantasy against Rome
- Galton & Trumbo, NYPD adventures
- Gladiateur de Bronze, superhero
- Greg Jordan, racecar driver
- Gun Gallon, heroic fantasy
- Havoc, western
- Homicron, superhero
- Homme de Metal, heroic fantasy
- Hunter, western
- Indian Kid, western
- Ivan Karine, Tsarist Russia adventures
- Ivan Wolonsky, Teenage Psychic
- Jacky West, western
- Jaleb, alien telepath
- Jaydee, alien shapeshifter
- Jean Brume, Scarlet Pimpernel-like hero
- Jean Girodet, espionage
- Jed Puma, western martial arts
- Jeff Sullivan, superhero
- Jill & John
- Jim Mississippi, masked western avenger
- Johnny Bourask, Colonial hero
- Kabur, heroic fantasy
- Kit Kappa, martial arts
- Larry Cannon, insurance investigations
- Lion des Thermopyles, Greek Antiquity adventures
- Lucifer, fallen angel must do good to redeem himself
- Lys Noir, pirate adventures
- Mac, three Scotsmen in the Old West
- Madison Bill, Prohibition-era adventures
- Malinbourne, space fantasy
- Marino, underwater superhero
- Masque Blanc, Apartheid superhero
- Max Flanagan, World War I photographer
- Max Tornado, superhero
- Mikros, superhero
- Morgane, supernatural adventures
- Motoman, teenage superhero
- Mozam, African jungle lord
- Neptune, underwater adventures
- Oncle Rufus, eccentric superhero
- Ozark, Lakota magic
- Patrouille des Profondeuirs, underground adventures
- Pedro & Doc, western odd couple
- Petit Cube, superhero
- Petit Scout, western adventures
- Phenix, superhero
- Photonik, superhero
- Pilote Noir, superhero
- Prince de la Nuit, crimefighter in 1800 Paris
- Quanter, genius scientist
- Rakar, Lakota superhero
- Rataplan, US Cavalry adventures
- Renard le Flambeur, Mississippi riverboat adventures
- Ricky Rox, western
- Ring Joe, boxing
- Rip MacQueen, journalist
- Rod Zey, engineer and troubleshooter
- Roi des Profondeurs, underwater superhero
- Sadko le Prince Archer, Robin Hood-type adventures
- Sergeant Cannon, WWII adventures
- Sibilla, supernatural adventures
- Silver Shadow, science fiction adventures
- SOS Trio, detective
- Starlock, superhero
- Stormalong, 1800 New Orleans adventures
- Superbill, young prodigy
- Tahy Tim, adventures in the Raj
- Tanka, jungle lord
- Ted Brenton, western adventures
- Tocard Gang, Prohibition-era adventures
- Trapper John, French-Indian Wars adventures
- Trois Lords, three British Lords fight crime
- Utopia, three kids found a new country
- Viking, a viking warrior in the New World
- Waki, post-cataclysmic adventures
- Wampus
- Wingo Scout, western hero
- X-101, espionage hero
- Yatan, a jungle lord
- Zapo, a western avenger
- Zembla

== Sources ==
- Éditions Lug at the Grand Comics Database
- Les Editions LUG. Les Editions Black and White. YouTube (in French). 18 September 2015.
- Potet, Frédéric (3 June 2016). "Lug : quand les super-héros affrontaient la censure en France »". Le Monde (in French).
- AGGABI, Pascal (11 December 2023). "Décès de Claude Vistel la "Miss" Marvel des Éditions Lug" [Death of Claude Vistel, 'Miss' Marvel from Éditions Lug]. ActuaBD (in French).
