= Strangers (French comic book) =

Cover of the first issue

Strangers is a French comic book depicting a superhero team, consisting of many of Éditions Lug's most popular heroes, all aliens residing on Earth (hence its name). It was written by Jean-Marc Lofficier and illustrated by various artists for publishers Semic Comics and Image Comics in 2002 and 2003.

== Membership ==
The team was composed of the following characters:

- Futura, a mysterious woman from another dimension somehow related to Wampus
- Homicron, a NASA physicist whose body is inhabited by the energies and memories of a powerful alien
- Jaleb, the agent of a race of galactic telepaths
- Jaydee (or Jayde in the French version), an alien shapeshifter killing machine and last of its kind
- Starlock, the former servant of awesome cosmic entities, now a fugitive
- Tanka, a former Tarzanesque jungle lord, empowered by men from the distant future to safeguard our segment of time.

== Story ==
Homicron asks Starlock to assist the international security organization C.L.A.S.H. with the disposal of WMDs stored in a space station. Meanwhile, on Earth, Tanka enlists Futura's help and tries to rescue Jaleb from his comatose state. In orbit, the space station is taken over by the robotic army of the power-mad scientist Astaroth.

Homicron, Starlock and Futura join the forces of C.L.A.S.H. to battle Astaroth. However, all is not what it seems, as a new villain is revealed, who was secretly pulling manipulating Astaroth all along: the deadly Tarantula, who uses a brainwashed Jaydee as her tool and plans to crash the station on Earth, virtually ending all life on the planet. Finally, the true mastermind behind the doomsday scheme is revealed: the arch-villain the Necromancer.

From his base on the Moon, the dying Necromancer schemes to turn Earth into his funeral pyre. But his passing would not be complete without the humiliation of his arch-enemies, the super-group known as Hexagon. As the Strangers mount a last, desperate attempt on the Moonbase to stop the villain's suicidal plan, he turns Hexagon against them.

The villain then takes refuge in his ultimate citadel: a station in orbit around the Sun, from which he plans to cause our star to go nova, using Starlock's precious starseed which he recovered on the Moon. The Strangers follow, and the final battle against the Necromancer begins. Tanka and Jaleb arrive in time to save the day.

The ultimate chess player finally reveals himself: Duke Oxian, the mad neuroform from the far future, who, from the heart of the Sun itself, schemes to reshape the patterns of time. Only Homicron and Jaleb can safely go to challenge him in the heart of the Sun.

Two subsequent episodes dealt with the origins of Futura and Starlock.

== Bibliography ==
=== Le Dossier Homicron ===
- 1. Un Tigre par la Queue (Lofficier/Dzialowski)
- 2. Double Jeu (Lofficier/Dzialowski)
- 3. L'Ombre du Passé (Lofficier/Dzialowski)
- 4. Le Regard de l'Abysse (Lofficier/Dzialowski)
- 5. Transition (Lofficier/Dzialowski)

=== Saison 0: Présages & Prologues ===
- Tanka: Les Origines (Lofficier/Lainé/Arden)
- Wampus: Interlude à Manhattan (Lofficier/Bernasconi)
- Frank Universal: Le Château du Nécromant (Lofficier/Dzialowski)
- Starlock: Le Retour de Starlock (Lofficier/Bernasconi)
- Gladiateur de Bronze: Les Origines (Stillborn/Corgeggiani/Malgrain/Vandaele)
- Futura: L'Autre Côté du Monde (Lofficier/Reed Man)
- Strangers: La Partie d’Echec (Lofficier/Various)

=== Saison 1: Etrangers en Terre Etrangère ===
- 1. Les Anges à l'Œil Fauve (Lofficier/Garcia/Alpuente)
- 2. Les Ombres de la Nuit (Lofficier/Garcia/Pina/Alpuente)
- 3. Caresses de Serpent (Lofficier/Pina/Alpuente)
- 4. Le Matin Livide (Lofficier/Garcia/Pina/Alpuente)
- 5. Au Soir, Il Fera Froid (Lofficier/Blanco/Alpuente)
- 6. Régner par l'Effroi (Lofficier/Blanco/Alpuente)
- 7. Où l'On Parle de Fins et de Débuts (Lofficier/Pasarin)
- 8. Le Jugement d'Alpha (Lofficier/Minne)

=== Saison 2: Des Dieux et des Hommes ===
- 1. Tanka à Feu et à sang (La Ménagerie Infâme) (Lofficier/Macall)
- 2. Jayde vs Hunter (Un Joueur Avide) (Lofficier/De La Torre)
- 3. Vierge ou Démon? (Lofficier/Minne) (22 p couleur)
- 4. La Colère d’Azaka Tonnerre (De Métal et d'Agate) (Lofficier/Macall)
- 5. La Mort est un Zorr-ko (L'Ange Inviolé) (Lofficier/Fernandez)
- 6. La Fin d’un Stranger (Sous de Vastes Portiques) (Lofficier/Ruis)
- 7. Le Retour d'Ozark (Solennelle Magie) (Lofficier/Macall)
- 8. L'Horizon Noir (Lofficier/De La Torre)

=== Saison 3: Atlantis, Mon Amour ! ===
- 1. La Veille de la Fin du Monde (Ce que pleurent les morts?) (Lofficier/Macall)
- 2. Jayde contre Mygalex / Le Secret de Futura / En ce grave moment...(Lofficier/Garcia/Mongiovi/Ouvrard)
- 3. La Venue de Starcyb (Des fantômes puissants...) (Lofficier/Macall)
- 4. L’Epervier entre en scène (L’Appareil sanglant de la destruction) (Lofficier/Vargas)
- 5. Strangers vs Dick Demon (S’agite le démon...) (Lofficier/Peniche)
- 6. Au secours de Malinbourne (L'Or des Voutes Azurées) / Les Constructeurs de Zade / Dick Spade, Revenant (Lofficier/Roncagliolo/Picard)
- 7. La Magie de Morgane (Vaincu, tu rêves en silence) (Lofficier/Lirussi)
- 8. Le Retour de Kit Kappa (Le sinistre miroir) (Lofficier/Garcia)
- 9. Le Défi de la Naine Blanche (Les chastes étoiles) (Lofficier/Ouvrard)
- 10. Au Royaume de Shivar (Où veillent des monstres visqueux) (Lofficier/Peniche)
- 11. Et enfin... Homicron! (Avec l’amas de sa crinière sombre) (Lofficier/Vargas)
- 12. Le Roi des Profondeurs vs Slyme (Et des parcelles d’or...) (Lofficier / Macall)
- 13. Le Grand Duel de Jaleb contre le Surmental (Etoile de mes yeux, soleil de ma nature) (Lofficier/Ouvrard)
- 14. A l’assaut d’Atlantis (Nuit noire, rouge aurore) (Lofficier/Garcia)
- 15. Los Frontizeros / Soeurette à Manhattan (Lofficier/Peniche/Mayorga)
- 16. Place aux Enchanteurs! (Je guette des êtres singuliers) (Lofficier/Mayorga) (
- 17. Enchanteurs vs Hexagon! (Ses noirs enchantements, son cortège infernal) (Lofficier/Castro)
- 18. Atlantis, mon amour! (Seul avec la nuit) (Lofficier/Macall)

=== Saison 4: Les Enfants de Zade ===
- 1. Côte à côte avec le Garde Républicain (Sa Parfaite Clarté...) (Lofficier/Macall/Peniche)
- 2. Futura ! Morgane ! Bouche Rouge ! Swords and Sorceress ! (...Aux lieux que la folie encombre) (Lofficier/Peniche)
- 3. Cela devait arriver... Zembla vs Yatan ! (Des Chemins Singuliers) (Lofficier/Ruiz)
- 4. A L’aide de la France ! (Du fond du gouffre obscur) (Lofficier/Vargas)
- 5. Le Retour de Jaleb / Les Partisans du Pacifique (Un Palais flétri/Les Partisans du Pacifique) (Lofficier/Mayorga/Guevara)
- 6. A L’ère du Roi Kabur (L'Épée et la dague traîtresse...) (Lofficier/Peniche)
- 7. Morgane traquée, Mr. 17 démasqué (Les cris lamentables des loups) (Lofficier/Garcia/Ouvrard)
- 8. L’Espoir de Zhud (Le Carnage et la Mort...) (Lofficier/Macall) (44 p n&b)

=== Strangers Universe ===
- 3. Starlock: Le Pont sur les Etoiles (Lofficier/De La Torre) + Starlock/Homicron/Gladiateur de Bronze: Les Démons de Céphée (Lofficier/De La Torre)
- 4. Futura/Galaor: L’Ile des Lamentations (Lofficier/Macall)
- 5. Le Triomphe du Gladiateur de Bronze (Lofficier/Ouvrard)
