= Airtight Garage =

1976 comic strip

The Airtight Garage (Le Garage Hermétique)
- The cover of the 1987 US edition of The Airtight Garage.
- Series: Major Fatal
- Publisher: Les Humanoïdes Associés; Humanoids Publishing; Marvel Comics; Epic

Creative team
- Creator: Mœbius

Original publication
- Date of publication: 1976–1979
- ISBN: 2731614145

The Airtight Garage (French: Le Garage Hermétique or, in its earliest serialized form, Le Garage Hermétique de Jerry Cornelius) is a lengthy comic strip work by the artist and writer Moebius (real name Jean Giraud). It first appeared in discrete two-to-four-page episodes, in issues 6 through 41 of the Franco-Belgian comics magazine Métal Hurlant from 1976 to 1979, and later in the American version of the same magazine, Heavy Metal, starting in 1977. It was subsequently collected as a graphic novel in various editions.

== Plot ==
Moebius has explained that the story was improvised in a deliberately whimsical or capricious manner. For this reason, the story is at times (deliberately) confusing. The "garage" itself is actually an asteroid in the constellation Leo which houses a pocket universe. Major Grubert orbits the asteroid in his spaceship Ciguri, from which he oversees the development of the worlds contained within. Several entities, including Jerry Cornelius, seek to invade the garage.

== Publication history ==
The book-length version appeared first in the original French and with the original black and white art, and only later in a US edition in English and in color. The US edition, published by Marvel Comics' Epic imprint in 1987 (as the third volume in a series devoted to the collected works of Moebius), used a new translation, by Jean-Marc Lofficier and Randy Lofficier, different from the Heavy Metal serialisation, and presented the work with the pages colored. This version, along with most of the other Epic volumes collecting Moebius's work, was later reprinted in a signed & numbered limited edition hardcover series from Graphitti Designs.

It was also published in the UK as a graphic novel by Titan Books in 1989, in advance of a Sony film adaptation that was never made. It was also reprinted in 1992 in the smaller, standard comic-book format, as a four-issue limited series that included several new pages drawn especially for that edition.

In the twenty years since then, no English-language edition has been published. In France, however, as of 2012, the French version (Le Garage Hermétique) is available in both the original black-and-white "classique" edition and in a "Moebius U.S.A." format that combines the color art from the US editions with the original French text. Various deluxe editions featuring larger pages and/or a slipcase have also been offered, indicating the book's continued popularity and centrality in the Moebius canon.

== Sequels and related works ==
The Airtight Garage was followed by L'Homme du Ciguri (The Man from the Ciguri) in 1995 and Le Chasseur Déprime (The Depressed Hunter) in 2008.

Some of the characters from these stories also show up in the 1974 comic Le Bandard Fou (The Horny Goof), which can be considered a prequel to The Airtight Garage.

The hero of The Airtight Garage, Major Grubert, was also the subject of some shorter comic-strip stories, poster images, and paintings over the course of his creator's long career, and eventually became the central character in an entire sketchbook-as-graphic-novel entitled Le Major, published in a limited edition facsimile in 2011. Major Grubert and his lady companion Malvina also appear throughout the six-volume Inside Moebius series (2000–2008).

== Critical responses ==
The Airtight Garage is "generally regarded as Moebius' masterpiece" according to journalist and critic Chris Mautner, who ranked it first on a list of "essential Moebius works" shortly after the author's death in March 2012. In Mautner's view, "Garage pulsates with life, slowly unwinding its various plot strands, and delighting you in the various ways those strands connect, or fail to". Writer Sean Witzke has called it "the perfect comic" and "the only comic I have ever read that feels alive. It digresses against itself, doubles back, thinks, laughs, pauses, lurches, and eventually gracefully dances. This comic breathes". Matthias Wivel, writing in The Comics Journal in December 2009, wrote: "The Garage is a map of creation. It goes beyond world-building to explore the creative act itself. . . . By virtue of Moebius' visual inventiveness and attention to detail, the Garage becomes a journey through [an] inner space . . . traveling at the speed of the reader's discovery". Wivel also noted that "the fantasy world of the Garage accommodated any idea [Moebius] could come up with and any representational style – from exquisite illustrative rendering to big-foot cartooning".

Critical opinion is divided, however, as to the virtues of the color version compared to the original black and white art. Wivel, for example, has referred to the 1987 American edition as "garishly colored" whereas Witzke feels "the colors can't be undersold . . . they are transformative to the work, and all you need to do is look at the sun setting over two pages, which is so good it's kind of an insult to call it stunning". Among Moebius admirers there seems to be no consensus on this matter, and some readers like both versions. Ian MacEwan, the creator of a popular Tumblr site dedicated to Moebius, has called himself "a huge fan of the coloring . . . I like it at least as much as the original b&w, purist in me be damned".

== Trademark dispute ==
The Jerry Cornelius character was originally invented by Michael Moorcock who at one point gave permission for him to be used by any artist or writer who wished to. There was later some dispute over the character, and the right of use was revoked. When Marvel Comics reprinted the series, the name Jerry Cornelius was changed to "Lewis Carnelian".

In 2006, on his website, Moorcock himself wrote:

I didn't retroactively withdraw permission. Moebius was a friend of friends of mine when he started and someone (I don't know who) told him I didn't like the strip. I loved the strip, though I'd said it wasn't really Jerry Cornelius. This got taken to mean by someone that I didn't like it and Moebius, whom I came to know later and explain that I hadn't withdrawn permission, took the JC out of the title. He knows now that I liked it and had no problems with it.

== Legacy ==
The Airtight Garage was also the name of a bar and videogame parlor in the Metreon in San Francisco, featuring unique original games developed for the venue. The name and architectural styling was no coincidence, and Moebius souvenirs could be purchased there. The arcade was later renamed Portal One, and the original games were phased out in favour of more familiar ones (although the decor was still Moebius-inspired). It closed permanently on 13 May 2007. It reopened briefly under the name Tilt with the same decor, but otherwise as a traditional arcade. Tilt is now closed, and the entire second floor of the building has become a City Target concept store.
