= Gil Formosa =

French cartoonist and illustrator (born 1959)

- Born: 1959 (age 66–67)
- Areas: Cartoonist, Artist

Gil Formosa (born 1959) is a French cartoonist and an illustrator.

Formosa entered the comics world in 1977 at the age of 18, he created four short stories for Pilote magazine. He also began the heroic fantasy series Légendes du Chevalier Cargal in this magazine in 1982. The series ran until 1989. Afterwards, Formosa went to work in the advertising and animation field creating the original character design for Totally Spies! He did several commissions for Glénat (two albums of Tex Avery), Marvel Comics (a Conan cover) and Semic Comics (several covers and illustrations)

Gil Formosa produced painted covers for a variety of French science fiction, comic book and game American publishers. Formosa became one of France's leading commercial illustrators, with credits including film posters (Lady Hawke) and major advertising campaigns. More recently, Formosa returned to comics, illustrating three Steampunk graphic novels featuring the character of Robur created by Jules Verne: With writer Jean-Marc Lofficier, he began the Robur series at Albin Michel in 2003. With writer Corbeyran, he began the "Double Gauche" series at Dargaud in 2006.
