= Semic Comics =

French comic book publisher

Semic S.A.
- Predecessor: Éditions Lug
- Founded: January 1989; 37 years ago
- Defunct: 2005
- Country of origin: France
- Headquarters location: (1989–1999) Lyon (from 1999) Paris
- Publication types: Comic books (reprints, translations, original stories)
- Fiction genres: Adventure, war, superheroes
- Owners: (1989–c. 1999) Semic Press (from c. 1999) Tournon Group

Semic Comics (French: [semik] is one of the leading comic book publishers in France. It is officially known as Semic S.A.

Along with French comics, the company formerly published the official translations of products produced by DC Comics and Marvel Comics. Today, Semic publishes translations from other American publishers such as Avatar Press, Dark Horse Comics, Image Comics, and Top Cow Productions.

Semic's imprints include Semic Books and Semic Manga.

== History ==
=== Éditions Lug ===
In 1950, writer/editor Marcel Navarro and Auguste Vistel founded Éditions Lug. At first, the company only reprinted old French and Italian comics. But soon, Navarro decided that his company needed some original characters. He enlisted a number of French and Italian studios to create a new series. Although many of them invoked characters featured in American comics, they had enough differences to make them unique.

In 1969, Éditions Lug began publishing licensed translations of Marvel Comics in a magazine called Fantask. That year also saw the creation of Wampus. But French censorship forced Éditions Lug to cancel both of these magazines after six issues.

In the next two decades, Éditions Lug continued to expand, thanks to its growing program of French editions of Marvel Comics, which began to include Conan the Barbarian. Many new magazines and series were added to their French line. A shared universe began to emerge, although not nearly as tightly integrated as the Marvel Universe.

In the mid-1980s, Auguste Vistel died. Eventually, Marcel Navarro chose to retire. In 1989, Éditions Lug was sold to the Semic Group / Semic Press, a Scandinavian comic book publisher, and renamed Semic France.

=== Semic Group ===
After Navarro's departure, Semic continued to publish French editions of Marvel Comics, but in 1993 discontinued the creation of original material. The half-dozen original Lug titles that remained became reprints-only; Lug was fully merged into Semic in 1994.

=== Tournon Group / Semic S.A. ===
In 1997 the Semic Group was sold to the Danish media house Egmont. At the time of the sale, the Semic Group sold a controlling interest in the company that had formerly been Éditions Lug back to its French partners/distributors, the Tournon Group. The new, autonomous publisher operated under the name Semic S.A. In May 1999, Tournon moved the company's headquarters from Lyon to Paris.

In 2000, under new editor-in-chief Thierry Mornet, Semic S.A. revamped its old characters and began publishing new stories. In late 2003/early 2004, Semic canceled the new lines. As a result, in early 2004, a multinational group of writers and artists formed Hexagon Comics and reclaimed the rights to the characters they had created for the publisher.

In 2005, the Tournon Group dissolved the company, although the "Semic" brand continued to belong to Tournon.

Since 2011, the name has been revived by one of Tournon's companies, Semic Distribution, which is responsible for marketing derivative products, in particular those of Marvel Comics.

== Titles ==
=== Franco-Belgian comics ===
==== Carabas ====
- See Carabas

==== Tournon/Semic ====
- L'Affaire se Corse
- Brigade Temporelle
- C'est la Vie
- Caleb
- Cosmic Patrouille
- Fallait Pas Faire les Cons
- Hé, Nic ! Tu rêves? ("Hey, Nick! Are you dreaming?")
- Hip Flask
- La Grande Purge
- La Légende de la Jarre
- Légendes Celtes
- Légendes Lakotas
- Les Mysteres du Meurtre
- No Man's Land
- OverEarth
- Relais & Mago
- Ruse
- La Tapisserie de Soie
- La Voie du Samouraï

=== Comics ===
==== Semic Comics ====
- Alone in the Dark
- Aria
- BattleGods
- Buffy contre les Vampires
- City Legends (Nash & Zentak) – Formerly. Now published by Delcourt
- Concrete
- The Creech
- CrossGen Chronicles
- CrossGen Extra
- CrossGen Spécial
- CrossGen Universe
- Les CrossOvers
- The Dirty Pair
- The First
- Futurians
- GateCrasher
- Ghost
- Grendel
- Hellboy – Formerly. Now published by Delcourt
- Hellcop
- HellSpawn
- Just a Pilgrim
- Lady Pendragon
- Leave It to Chance
- Lenore
- Meridian
- Ministère de l'Espace
- More Than Mortal
- Motor Mayhem
- Mystic
- Photonik
- La Planète des Singes
- Powers
- The Red Star
- Rex Mundi
- Sam and Twitch
- Savage Dragon – later acquired by Delcourt
- Scion
- Shi
- Shock Rockets
- Sigil
- Smart Guns (Carmen McCallum & Travis) – later acquired by Delcourt
- Sojourn
- Spawn – later acquired by Delcourt
  - "Simony"
- Stone
- Strangers
- Tellos
- The Tenth
- The 10th Muse
- Titan A.E.
- TransFormers
- Vampi
- Vampirella
- Witchblade – later acquired by Delcourt
- The Wicked
- YoungBlood

=== Manga and manhwa ===
==== Semic Manga ====
- Le mystère d'Aloa
- Shadows of Spawn
- Sentaï School

== See also ==
- Panini Comics
