= Alone in the Dark (disambiguation) =

Alone in the Dark is a survival horror video game series.

Alone in the Dark may also refer to:

== Films ==
- Alone in the Dark (1978 film) (Spanish: Solos en la madrugada), a 1978 Spanish film
- Alone in the Dark (1982 film), a 1982 horror film
- Alone in the Dark (2005 film), a 2005 horror film loosely based on the video game series
- Alone in the Dark II (film), a 2008 horror film sequel to the 2005 film

== Video games ==
- Alone in the Dark (1992 video game), the first in the series of Alone in the Dark video games
- Alone in the Dark 2 (video game), 1993 sequel to the first game
- Alone in the Dark 3, 1994 sequel to the second game
- Alone in the Dark: The New Nightmare, 2001 video game
- Alone in the Dark (2008 video game), first reboot of the series
- Alone in the Dark: Illumination, second reboot of the series
- Alone in the Dark (2024 video game), third reboot of the series

== Music ==
- "Alone in the Dark", a song by John Hiatt from his 1987 album Bring the Family
- "Alone in the Dark", a song by Testament from their 1987 album The Legacy
- "Alone in the Dark", a song by Iron Fire from their 2006 album Revenge
- "Alone in the Darkness", a song by All That Remains from their 2018 album Victim of the New Disease
