= Alone in the Dark (2024 video game) =

2024 video game

- Developer: Pieces Interactive
- Publisher: THQ Nordic
- Director: Mikael Hedberg
- Producers: Claes Johansson; Michael Paeck; Andreas Schmiedecker
- Designer: Magdalena Erlikson
- Programmer: Carl-Oscar Lönn
- Artists: Rikard Ryberg; Robin Koitzsch
- Writer: Mikael Hedberg
- Composers: Árni Bergur Zoëga; Jason Köhnen
- Series: Alone in the Dark
- Engine: Unreal Engine 4
- Platforms: PlayStation 5; Windows; Xbox Series X/S
- Release: 20 March 2024
- Genre: Survival horror
- Mode: Single-player

Alone in the Dark is a 2024 survival horror video game developed by Pieces Interactive and published by THQ Nordic. It is a reimagining of the original 1992 Alone in the Dark and is the seventh installment in the Alone in the Dark series. The game features a single-player narrative set in the 1930s, where players can choose to play as Edward Carnby (David Harbour) or Emily Hartwood (Jodie Comer), as they make their way through Derceto Mansion to uncover the mysteries within.

Alone in the Dark was released for PlayStation 5, Windows, and Xbox Series X/S on 20 March 2024. Upon release, the game received mixed reviews from critics and failed to meet the sales expectations of THQ Nordic's parent company Embracer Group, which led to the closure of Pieces Interactive in June 2024.

== Gameplay ==
Alone in the Dark features an "over-the-shoulder" third-person perspective, doing away with the fixed camera angles of the original. This is similar to the Resident Evil franchise, which also chose this presentation for their recent remakes. Combat is available with various firearms, as well as melee weapons that can be found throughout the game. Players can choose to play as Emily or Edward, both campaigns featuring different cutscenes and levels.

Combat consists of firearms, melee weapons and throwable objects, along with environmental hazards that can be used to have an edge on the monsters. The environment is filled with items for the player to find, such as ammo, melee weapons, keys, collectibles such as journals, letters and lagniappes that unlock secret informations about the story and objectives.

== Plot ==
Sometime in the 1930s Louisiana, private investigator Edward Carnby accompanies Emily Hartwood to Derceto Manor, a remote sanatorium, after Emily receives a disturbing letter from her missing uncle, Jeremy Hartwood. Jeremy, a once-renowned artist, had been receiving treatment at Derceto, but his message hints at danger and urges Emily to stay away. Upon arrival, Edward and Emily find Jeremy missing and the manor filled with signs of unrest among both patients and staff. (Note: Players can choose to play as either Edward or Emily; both offer the same gameplay experience but with differences in dialogue and collectibles.)

As they search for Jeremy within the compound, they uncover evidence of a secretive voodoo-influenced cult operating within the institution. Their investigation leads them into hidden passages and eventually into nightmarish alternate realities, accessed through a talisman that belonged to Jeremy. These realms, which represent twisted reflections of the real world, manifest Jeremy's deteriorating mind and are populated by monstrous, surreal creatures. Along the way, they encounter a strange masked entity called the Dark Man.

Throughout the journey, Edward confronts his mounting guilt toward Grace Saunders, a young resident of Derceto whom he once failed to protect on a previous case. The resurfacing of his memories intensifies as the supernatural influences of the manor grow stronger. Meanwhile, Emily struggles with deep emotional wounds from the death of her husband in World War I, a loss that the Dark Man tries to exploit to break her resolve.

The investigation reveals that Jeremy has made a desperate pact with the Dark Man in exchange for keeping a cosmic entity known as "The Black Goat of the Woods with a Thousand Young" trapped within the confines of Derceto Manor. This pact has placed the mansion within a maze of alternate dimensions, essentially trapping all the residents within without any means of escape. Jeremy trapped fragments of his consciousness in a submerged dream-temple within his own mind. A battle ensues with a monstrous creature in the alternate world, and after defeating it by stabbing it in the left eye, it is revealed to be Jeremy in the real world. The result of the incident leaves him lobotomized. Ultimately, both the patients and staff of Derceto are revealed to be cult members and are preparing a final ritual centred around a corrupted “wish tree” in the conservatory, intending to summon a cosmic being known as the Mother or Black Goat.

Alone in the Dark features multiple possible endings, determined by character choice and specific collectible sets:

- Default Ending (Edward or Emily): When Edward and Emily stop Grace from being sacrificed, the tree becomes angry and reveals its true monstrous form, causing several cult members to be killed. Edward and Emily defeat the Black Goat and effectively destroy it. In the wake of dawn, the surviving characters leave the premises as Derceto is engulfed in flames.
- Edward's Alternate Ending – “One of the Thousand Young”: If Edward discovers a specific Lagniappe set, he may interact differently with the wish tree during the final ritual. This choice results in him being absorbed into the cult's cosmic design, suggesting he becomes part of the Mother's brood.
- Emily's Alternate Ending – “Radical Acceptance”: With a different set of collectibles, Emily can access a hidden sequence in Dr. Gray's apartment, where she ultimately submits to the Dark Man's influence. In this ending, she embraces oblivion rather than resisting the supernatural forces that have haunted her.
- Secret Grace Ending – “What Just Happened?” (both characters): After completing both campaigns and acquiring the “All the World’s a Stage” Lagniappe set, the player may give Grace a toy during the final chapter. This triggers a metafictional, fourth-wall-breaking ending in which Grace appears aware of the game's structure and resets the narrative in a surreal, comedic twist.

== Development ==
A remake of the original 1992 game Alone in the Dark was in active development by Eden Games after the release of Alone in the Dark: Inferno. But following the liquidation of the studio by Atari in 2013, the game was cancelled.

Three years after the poor reception of Alone in the Dark: Illumination, then-owner Atari SA sold the Alone in the Dark franchise to THQ Nordic in September 2018. Pieces Interactive, which was most known for making Magicka 2, commenced development of the game in late 2019. The game was written by Mikael Hedberg, who had previously worked at Frictional Games on Soma and Amnesia: The Dark Descent. Artist Guy Davis, best known for his work with Guillermo del Toro, the comic series B.P.R.D., and his own comic series The Marquis, was recruited to design the monsters featured in the game. Series creator Frédérick Raynal gave his blessings to the reimagining saying that Pieces Interactive did a great job preserving the "core feeling" from the original game.

English actress Jodie Comer and American actor David Harbour were recruited for the voice and facial motion capture of the two protagonists.

== Release ==
In August 2022, Alone in the Dark was revealed at THQ Nordic's Showcase. A playable prologue for the game, titled Grace in the Dark, was released for PlayStation 5, Windows, and Xbox Series X/S on 25 May 2023. The full game was originally scheduled to release for those platforms on 25 October 2023, but was delayed a month before release to 16 January 2024 to "avoid competing with" Alan Wake 2 and Spider-Man 2. In December 2023, it was again delayed to 20 March 2024 to "avoid any potential crunch over the Christmas holidays".

== Reception ==
Reception

Aggregate scores
Aggregator	Score
Metacritic	(PC) 67/100 (PS5) 63/100 (XSXS) 66/100
OpenCritic	43% recommend

=== Critical reception ===
Alone in the Dark received "mixed or average" reviews from critics, according to review aggregator website Metacritic. Fellow review aggregator OpenCritic assessed that the game received weak approval, being recommended by 43% of critics.

=== Sales ===
Alone in the Dark failed to meet the sales expectations of THQ Nordic's parent company Embracer Group, leading Embracer to shut down Pieces Interactive in June 2024.

=== Accolades ===
The game was nominated for "Best Audio for an Indie Game", "Best Dialogue for an Indie Game" and "Best Ensemble Cast Performance" at the Game Audio Network Guild Awards in March 2025.
