= We Are Zombies =

2023 Canadian/French horror film

- Official release poster
- Directed by: François Simard; Anouk Whissell; Yoann-Karl Whissell
- Written by: Jerry Frissen; François Simard; Anouk Whissell
- Based on: The Zombies That Ate the World by Jerry Frissen
- Produced by: Laurent Baudens; Didar Domehri; Fabrice Giger; Gaël Nouaille; Pierre Spengler
- Starring: Alexandre Nachi; Derek Johns; Megan Peta Hill
- Cinematography: Jean-Philippe Bernier
- Edited by: Joris Laquittant
- Production companies: Borsalino Productions; Maneki Films; Christal Films; Humanoids Inc.; WAG Prod
- Distributed by: Capella Films
- Release date: August 9, 2023 (FanTasia)
- Running time: 80 minutes
- Countries: Canada; France
- Language: English

We Are Zombies is a 2023 Canadian French zombie horror comedy film based on the comic series The Zombies That Ate the World written and directed by Yoann-Karl Whissell, François Simard and Anouk Whissell. The film stars Alexandre Nachi, Derek Johns and Megan Peta Hill.

== Plot ==
In a world where humans peacefully coexist with docile zombies, who are treated as second-class citizens due to their "living-impaired" handicap, small-time thief Maggie Neard intercepts a call to collect an unwanted zombie via the Coleman Corporation's Retirement Services for the Living-Impaired. Posing as the collectors, Maggie's half-brother Karl and his best friend Freddy Mercks pick up the zombie from the McKenna residence, although they accidentally decapitate the zombie and it bites a family member. Due to the damage, the crew's black market contact Don only pays the trio half-price for the zombie. Meanwhile Hannity, a militaristic officer for the Coleman Corporation, berates his collectors Stanley and Rocco for repeatedly allowing the three thieves to intercept zombies they were assigned to pick up. Hannity orders the two of them to recover the $25,000 total they've missed out on.

Freddy reveals to Karl that his longtime crush on Maggie has inspired him to propose to her with a garish ring. When Karl counters that Freddy and Maggie have never even dated, Freddy insults Karl for being a chronic masturbator. Stanley and Rocco capture the two distracted friends during their argument. While confronting Karl and Freddy, Rocco accidentally shoots himself and becomes a zombie. Karl mentions his grandmother Mrs. Neard, which gives Stanley a new idea to get back the money he's owed.

Upon recovering at home with Maggie after having been knocked unconscious, Karl and Freddy find a videotape where Stanley and Rocco reveal they kidnapped Mrs. Neard and are demanding a ransom. Desperate to make quick cash, Karl, Maggie, and Freddy turn to Don for a job. Don refers the three thieves to controversial performance artist Otto Maddox, who negotiates to pay the trio $50,000 if they steal the corpse of actress Debbie Jones, who was famously first to play Zelvirella, a character similar to Vampira. Concerned that the undead will eventually outnumber the living, Hannity presents his "Project Zoltan," an experimental gas designed to reengineer zombies, to Coleman Corporation's board of directors. During a demonstration performed by Dr. Judith West, the undead test subject's head unexpectedly explodes. Disappointed with these results, Coleman CEO Bob Coleman terminates the project. However, Coleman subsequently dies from a sex swing "accident" (presumably killed by Hannity) and resurrects as a brain-damaged zombie, so Hannity uses the opportunity to take control of the company. Hannity later tests Project Zoltan on Coleman as well as Dr. West to confirm he can turn zombies feral.

Karl, Maggie, and Freddy infiltrate Country Hill Cemetery only to discover Debbie Jones's corpse is too skeletal to be reanimated. Maggie recognizes Stanley as her ex-boyfriend when he calls to reinforce his ransom demand. During that same call, Rocco carelessly shoots Mrs. Neard, who then becomes a zombie. Karl remembers that Jane, an undead, online sex performer he has a fascination with, resembles Zelvirella and can stand in for Debbie Jones. Along with Freddy and Maggie, Karl goes to the place where Jane performs and convinces her to come with them. Following a series of mishaps and odd events, including Karl having sex with Jane and an encounter with a state trooper, Karl, Freddy, and Maggie escort Jane back to Otto Maddox's private suite above his latest performance art show. Meanwhile, Hannity deploys his Project Zoltan gas on the show floor, which makes the zombies suddenly turn violent against humans.

Not wanting to see Jane leave because he has romantic feelings for her, Karl calls off the deal with Otto. Jane still chooses to go with Otto, so Karl confesses she isn't the real Zelvirella. Otto grows angry, but his outrage is interrupted when an undead Mother Theresa comes up to the suite and kills him. Don escapes with a briefcase full of Otto's money while everyone else in the room fights off another zombie. Don ends up overwhelmed by zombies when he gets down to the show floor. Jane collects the dropped briefcase and tries sneaking away as Karl, Maggie, and Freddy learn they have been framed as bioterrorists for the attack on Otto's art show.

Hannity captures Jane. Stanley reveals he was disguised as one of Hannity's henchmen when he unmasks and takes Hannity at gunpoint. Freddy breaks Hannity's neck, but he resurrects as a zombie and shoots Freddy. Maggie kills Hannity by decapitating him with a buzzsaw. Freddy reveals he survived the gunshot because the bullet hit the ring he planned to give to Maggie. Stanley steals the briefcase in the commotion. Stanley escapes, but he gets bit in the process and becomes a zombie.

Two weeks later, Karl, Maggie, Freddy, and Jane avoid getting arrested for the supposed terrorist attack, but only because Hannity's viral gas turned the world into a typical zombie apocalypse. Along with Rocco and Mrs. Neard, the four of them continue surviving in a diner owned by Freddy's Uncle Dave while Stanley wanders the wasteland still clutching the briefcase.

== Cast ==
- Alexandre Nachi as Karl Neard
- Derek Johns as Freddy Mercks
- Megan Peta Hill as Maggie
- Vincent Leclerc as Seth Mckenna
- Stéphane Demers as Otto Maddox
- Carlo Mestroni as Don
- Guy Nadon as Bob Coleman
- Patrick Abellard as Stanley
- Marc-André Boulanger as Rocco
- Rosemarie Sabor as Jane
- Clare Coulter as Mrs. Neard
- Teneisha Collins as Chelsea Lee
- Dusan Dukic as Brad Thompson
- Michelle Leblanc as Dr. Judith West
- Adrian Burhop as Oscar
- Kevin Woodhouse as State Ranger
- Benz Antoine as Hannity
- Charles Groulx as Pop pop
- David-Emmanuel Jauniaux as Road kill zombie
- Bianca De Luca as Beverly
- Frédérique Proulx as Susan Mckenna
- Odile Prouveur as Mother Theresa
- Hinde Rabbaj as Meteo Lady
- Aiden Shapiro as Twin Goon #1

== Production ==
=== Filming ===
The cast started to shoot the film on March 29, 2022, around Montreal, Canada.

== Release ==
The film premiered at Fantasia International Film Festival on August 9, 2023, Fantasy Filmfest on September 6, 2023, Slash Film Festival on September 22, 2023, Fantastic Fest on September 23, 2023 and Festival Européen du Film Fantastique de Strasbourg on September 27, 2023.

The film also premiered at Sitges Film Festival on October 8, 2023, Celluloid Screams on October 19, 2023, IFI Horrorthon on October 26, 2023, Toulouse Grindhouse Paradise Festival on April 27, 2024 and it is scheduled to release on Russia on August 15, 2024.

== Reception ==
On the review aggregator website Rotten Tomatoes, 100% of 6 critics' reviews are positive, with an average rating of 7.00/10.

Trace Thurman of Bloody Disgusting rate the film 3½ over 5 rating and wrote: We Are Zombies is a delightful, if slight, entry into the zombie sub-genre. It never goes beyond its surface-level observations, but it also doesn't have such lofty ambitions, so it's hard to hold that against it. Plus, it's so goddamn charming you're going to have a difficult time not having a complete and utter blast with it.

Donald Plante of Infamous Horror gave the film a perfect 5/5 rating and wrote: We Are Zombies refuses to take itself too seriously. While not falling into the B-movie category, it's sure to appeal to enthusiasts of indie horror films made on a shoestring budget. The gore effects are impressive and put on quite the spectacle. Each RKSS film stands apart from the rest, and this one is no exception. Undoubtedly, this movie will captivate zombie comedy aficionados, and it's well worth a watch for the sheer enjoyment it brings; it's a future cult classic that could rival Turbo Kid.

Matt Donato of Slashfilm rate the film 7 out of 10 and he wrote: "We Are Zombies" is an uneven zom-com until the third act's elegant gala backdrop becomes a living impaired feeding ground. You'll have tons of fun with the gore once circular saws spring geysers of bloody juices, and will laugh heartily throughout. There's just less to get excited about in certain scenes, like behind closed Coleman doors. Thankfully, RKSS muster "Turbo Kid" energy in enough bursts to power the charmingly oddball "We Are Zombies," offering an exotic zombie take along the lines of "Fido" or "Warm Bodies" (with more butt munching).

SAF Movie Reviews rated it 64 out of 100 and said: "A pleasant little gore comedy with some witty dialogue and cool one-liners. Standing not out might be its biggest flaw because the ingredients to create awesomeness are all there.

=== Accolades ===
Year	Awards	Category	Recipient	Result	Ref.
2023	Fantasia International Film Festival	Best Québec Feature	RKSS	Won	
2024	Fant, Bilbao Fantasy Film Festival	Best Film	We Are Zombies	Nominated	
