= Guy Davis (artist) =

American comic book artist

- Born: November 20, 1966 (age 60)
- Areas: Concept Designer, Production Designer, Creature Designer, Illustrator
- Notable works: Pacific Rim (film), Guillermo del Toro's Pinocchio (film), B.P.R.D., The Marquis
- Awards: 2023 Annie Award Winner (Pinocchio/ Best Production Design), 2023 Art Director Guild Winner (Pinocchio/ Best Production Design), "Best Penciller/Inker or Penciller/Inker Team" Eisner Award (2009)

Guy Davis (born 1966) is an American creature designer, concept artist, production designer, illustrator and storyboard artist who has worked on film, television, comic book and video game projects. He is known for his collaborations with filmmaker Guillermo del Toro, including the television series Cabinet of Curiosities (2022), The Strain (2014–17) and the films Pacific Rim (2013), Crimson Peak (2015), The Shape of Water (2017) and Pinocchio (2022) along with video game properties including Diablo IV, Gears of War 4 and Alone in the Dark. He has also provided illustration work for the White Wolf role-playing game series and TCM Underground, cover artwork for Criterion, poster art for Mondo and product design for Patrón. He started his art career illustrating comic books in 1985 and was the regular artist for the Hellboy spinoff comic B.P.R.D. (2003–2010), as well as the artist behind his own creator-owned comic The Marquis (1997-2009).

== Biography ==
=== Early Comics Career 1985 - 2010 ===
A self-taught illustrator, Guy Davis began his art career in 1985. Soon his independent work attracted the editors of Caliber Press, who published his first creator-owned series — the Harvey Award-nominated Baker Street. It was the success of Baker Street that got Davis work with DC Comics/Vertigo, illustrating Sandman Mystery Theatre. He illustrated Mike Mignola's ongoing B.P.R.D. series, The Zombies That Ate the World for Métal Hurlant, and his creator-owned series The Marquis for Dark Horse Comics. At the 2011 ECCC, Davis announced he would be leaving as the ongoing B.P.R.D. artist and no longer continue working in comics.

Concept Design and Film Work 2011 - present

Since leaving comics, Davis has moved to a career in Conceptual Design and Production Design, providing concept art, character design and storyboards for film, television and video games. He worked on Pacific Rim, designing the Kaiju Otachi and Slattern, along with various props and storyboards. Other conceptual design projects for director Guillermo del Toro include Cabinet of Curiosities where he worked as series creature designer, Nightmare Alley, The Shape of Water, Crimson Peak, The Strain TV series, The Simpsons Treehouse of Horror XXIV opening and the Frankenstein film from the director. He was also the award winning Production Designer and Character Designer on Guillermo del Toro's Pinocchio. Other concept and character design work includes Antlers, The Sea Beast, Lost in Space, MST3k: The Return, Steven Universe, ParaNorman, The Mill at Calder's End, The Haunted Swordsman, Asura, Big City Greens, Monster Hunter and We are Zombies, along with Costume Concept for Lord of the Rings: The Rings of Power and video game projects including Evolve, InSane, Gears of War 4, Diablo IV, State of Decay 3 and Alone in the Dark (2024).

=== Personal life ===
Davis currently resides in Michigan.

== Filmography / Bibliography ==
Concept art / Character design:

- Frankenstein (Netflix) Concept Designer 2022-2024
- Murderbot (Apple TV+) Concept Art 2022
- The Shape of Water (Fox/ Searchlight) Concept Designer 2013-2016
- Diablo IV (Blizzard Entertainment) Concept Designer 2017
- Antlers (Fox/ Searchlight) Creature Concept Designer 2018
- State of Decay 3 (UnDead Labs) Creature Designer 2021
- We Are Zombies (RKSS Films) Zombeast Concept Design 2022
- Cabinet of Curiosities (Netflix) Series Creature Designer 2022
- Lord of the Rings: The Rings of Power (Amazon) Costume Concept Design 2019
- Guillermo del Toro's Pinocchio (Netflix) Production Design / Character Design 2019
- Big City Greens the Movie: Spacecation (Disney) Concept Design 2022
- The Sea Beast (Netflix) Character/Creature Design 2018
- Nightmare Alley (Fox/Searchlight) Concept Designer 2019
- Asura Concept Designer 2015
- Fantastic Voyage (Fox/Searchlight) Concept Designer 2017
- Monster Hunter (Mr. X VFX) Concept Designer 2016
- Lost in Space (Spectral Motion VFX/ Netflix) Creature Design 2016
- Alone in the Dark (THQ Nordic) Creature Concept Design 2024
- Crimson Peak (Legendary Pictures) Concept Art 2013–2014
- The Strain (FX) Concept Art 2013–2014
- Big City Greens (DisneyXD) Concept Artist 2014
- Steven Universe (Cartoon Network) Additional Character Design / Additional Background Design Arcade Mania / Giant Woman, Tiger Millionaire / Steven's Lion 2013
- The Haunted Swordsman (Kevin McTurk/ The Spirit Cabinet) Production Designer / Creature Concept 2016
- The Mill at Calder’s End (Kevin McTurk / The Spirit Cabinet) Creature Concept 2013
- Pinocchio (Guillermo del Toro / Jim Henson Co) Concept Art 2012
- EVOLVE Video Game (Turtle Rock / THQ) Additional Creature Concept Design 2012
- The Simpsons Tree House of Horror XXIV Opening Titles / Couch gag (Fox) Storyboards / character design 2011
- Pacific Rim (Legendary Pictures / Warner Bros) Concept Art 2011–2012
- Pacific Rim: Uprising (Legendary Ent./ Universal Pictures) Concept Design 2015
- InSANE (THQ / Volition) Concept Art / Design 2010–2012
- At the Mountains of Madness (Guillermo del Toro) Concept Art 2010
- ParaNorman (Laika) Character Design 2008
- Black Sky (Chamber Six Productions) Concept Art 2007
- The Amazing Screw-On Head (KickStart Entertainment) Prop Design 2005
- The Zombies That Ate the World pilot (Les Humanoides Associes) Character Design 2004

IMDB

Comics work includes:

- Baker Street (art and script, with writer Gary Reed (first arc), ten-issue limited series, March 1989 - February 1991, collected as 2 trade paperbacks by Caliber Comics, single volume, iBooks, 352 pages, 2003, ISBN 978-0-7434-5904-4)
- Sandman Mystery Theatre (with Matt Wagner and Steve Seagle, Vertigo)
- Vertigo Visions: Phantom Stranger (with Alisa Kwitney, one-shot special, Vertigo)
- The Nevermen (with Phil Amara, Dark Horse Comics):
  - The Nevermen (4-issue mini-series, 2000, tpb, 120 pages, 2001, ISBN 1-56971-575-0)
  - Streets of Blood (3-issue mini-series, 2003, tpb, 80 pages, 2003, ISBN 1-56971-823-7)
- The Marquis (script and art, Dark Horse Comics):
- Fantastic Four: Unstable Molecules (with James Sturm, Marvel Comics, March–June, 2003, tpb, 2003, ISBN 0-7851-1112-3)
- Batman: Nevermore (with Len Wein, 5-issue mini-series, Elseworlds, DC Comics, June – October, 2003)
- The Zombies That Ate the World (art, with writer Jerry Frissen, in Métal Hurlant, #8-14, Sept/Oct. 2003 – Nov/Dec. 2004, tpb, Devil's Due Publishing, 184 pages, October 2009, ISBN 1-934692-66-2)
- B.P.R.D. (art, with writer Mike Mignola, Dark Horse Comics, July 2003 – 2011)
- Judge Dredd: "Out Law" (with Rob Williams, in Judge Dredd Megazine #296, March 2010)

Other Projects:

- At Home with Monsters / AGO/ LACMA / MUSA (Show Artwork / Exhibition Book Design)
- Patrón Tequila- Patrón X Guillermo del Toro (Packaging Design/ Illustration)
- The Devil's Backbone / Criterion (DVD cover art)
- White Wolf Games 1995-2004 (Chapter illustrations/ character sheets/ spot illos)
- Legacy by blues musician Guy Davis (cover and liner artwork)

== Awards ==
- 2023 Annie Award Winner: Pinocchio/ Best Production Design
- 2023 Art Director Guild Winner: Pinocchio / Best Production Design
- 2023 BAFTA Nomination: Pinocchio / Best Production Design
- 2021 FilmQuest Cthulhu Winner: The Haunted Swordsman / Best Production Design/Art Design-Short
- 2021 New York Cinematography Award Winner: The Haunted Swordsman / Best Production Design

He won the Eisner Award in

- 2004: Won "Best Limited Series," for Fantastic Four: Unstable Molecules with James Sturm
- 2009: Won "Best Penciller/Inker or Penciller/Inker Team," for BPRD
