= Alone in the Dark (1992 video game) =

Survival horror game

- Cover art for the North American MS-DOS release and CD-ROM version in Europe
- Developer: Infogrames (Note: PC-98 and FM Towns versions developed by Arrow Micro-Techs Corp; 3DO and Archimedes versions developed by Krisalis; iOS version developed by Kung-Fu Factory.)
- Publishers: EU: Infogrames; NA: I•Motion/Interplay (Note: The current publisher is THQ Nordic, who purchased the game franchise from Atari in 2018.)
- Director: Frédérick Raynal
- Producer: Bruno Bonnell
- Programmers: Frédérick Raynal; Franck De Girolami
- Artists: Didier Chanfray; Yaël Barroz; Jean-Marc Torroella
- Writers: Hubert Chardot; Franck Manzetti
- Composer: Philippe Vachey
- Series: Alone in the Dark
- Platforms: MS-DOS, RISC OS, 3DO, Mac OS, PC-98, FM Towns, iOS
- Release: 1992
- Genre: Survival horror
- Mode: Single-player

Alone in the Dark is a 1992 survival horror video game designed by Frédérick Raynal. Developed and published by Infogrames in 1992 for MS-DOS, the game was eventually ported to Mac OS, the PC-98, the FM Towns, the 3DO, RISC OS, and iOS. Alone in the Dark is set in 1920s Louisiana and challenges the player to escape a haunted mansion. To advance, the player must solve puzzles while banishing, slaying, or eluding various ghosts and monsters. The player can collect and use weapons, manage a weight-based inventory system, and explore a partially nonlinear map.

Raynal was motivated to create Alone in the Dark due to his interest in 3D animation and his fondness for horror films. The storyline was inspired by the Cthulhu Mythos of H. P. Lovecraft and the work of directors like Dario Argento and George A. Romero. Raynal's programming team worked to convey much of this story via key texts scattered about the game's environment. To overcome technical limitations, the production team also employed a fixed camera angle system to dramatically frame the movement of three-dimensional characters on top of two-dimensional background images.

Upon its release, Alone in the Dark received acclaim, with critics applauding its unsettling atmosphere, effective soundtrack, and technical inventiveness. The game also won several industry awards and is regularly included in lists of the best video games ever made. Often identified as the first 3D survival horror game, Alone in the Dark strongly influenced the production of Capcom's Resident Evil (1996), and it also spawned a series of follow-up games and two films. A reimagining of the original game, published by THQ Nordic, was released on 20 March 2024.

== Gameplay ==
The player can select a male or female character (Edward Carnby or Emily Hartwood, respectively), and is then trapped inside the haunted mansion of Derceto. The player character starts in the attic, having ascended to the top of the mansion without incident, and is tasked with finding a way out of the mansion while avoiding, outsmarting, or defeating various supernatural enemies. Although most enemies can be killed with fists and feet, the player can also find and utilize various weapons. Other opponents can only be defeated by solving a particular puzzle rather than a straight fight, while some cannot be killed at all and must be avoided.

Much of the game involves exploration and puzzle-solving, and the house can be searched through for clues as to what occurred before the player's arrival. The player can also open and close doors, push certain objects, and pick up and use key items. The inventory is limited, and the player must often discard items to make room. It is possible to discard items needed to complete the game, but discarded items remain in play and can be retrieved later, even if the player character leaves the room. Inventory space is determined by weight, not number of items. For example, the player may discard several lightweight items yet still be unable to pick up a heavy object.

Alone in the Dark has a partially non-linear level design. The player character is initially restricted to the attic and third floor, whose rooms are arranged in a way where they must be traversed in a linear order. Completing the puzzle at the end of the third floor grants the player character access to the first and second floors. The player can explore the rooms in this area in any order and revisit the attic and third floor if desired. Upon completing a specific puzzle, the player gains access to the caverns beneath the mansion. The caverns are entirely linear, and each puzzle must be overcome as it is encountered.

== Plot ==
In 1925, Jeremy Hartwood, a noted artist and owner of the Louisiana mansion Derceto, has died by suicide. His death appears suspicious yet seems to surprise nobody, for Derceto is reputed to be haunted by an evil power. The player assumes the role of either Edward Carnby (a private investigator who is sent to find a piano in the loft for an antique dealer) or Emily Hartwood (Jeremy's niece, who is also interested in finding the piano because she believes it contains a secret note that explains Jeremy's suicide). Depending on whether the player chooses to play as Carnby or Hartwood, the game begins with that character going to the mansion to investigate. Upon entering the house, the doors mysteriously slam shut behind the player character, and once they make it to the attic, they are attacked by monsters. The player character progresses down through the house, fighting off various creatures and hazards.

The player character finds documents throughout the house indicating Derceto was constructed by an occultist pirate named Ezechiel Pregzt, and that beneath the house are caverns wherein Pregzt performed dark rituals to enlarge his fortune and unnaturally extend his life. Pregzt was shot, and Derceto was burned down by encamped Union soldiers during the American Civil War. However, Pregzt's spirit lived on, coming to inhabit an old tree in the caverns underneath Derceto. Over the course of the game, the player discovers that Jeremy Hartwood killed himself to prevent his body being used by Pregzt as a host; for this reason, Pregzt is now targeting the player. If the player is incapacitated, their body is subsequently dragged to a sacrificial area and possessed by Pregzt, whereupon the game ends with an image of supernatural horrors being unleashed from the house into the world at large.

In another ending, the player character finds a passage into the caverns in Hartwood's study and makes their way to the tree where Pregzt resides. The player character throws a lantern at the tree, then flees the collapsing cavern. The flames consume Pregzt, and the house is purged of supernatural creatures and other effects caused by his influence. The player can finally open the front doors and leave the house (which, now empty of monsters, is mostly safe to explore). The game ends with the player returning to their car, only to discover that the person behind the wheel is a zombie, who drives the car back to civilization.

=== Cultural references ===
The story is heavily influenced by the works of H. P. Lovecraft. Grimoires found in the mansion's library include the Necronomicon and De Vermis Mysteriis, both taken from Lovecraft's Cthulhu Mythos. The last name of the character Edward Carnby is a reference to John Carnby, a character in the Mythos tale The Return of the Sorcerer by Clark Ashton Smith. Finally, several supernatural opponents are recognizable creatures from the Mythos (e.g., Deep Ones, Nightgaunts, Chthonians), and Pregzt even mentions Cthulhu.

== Development ==
=== Background ===
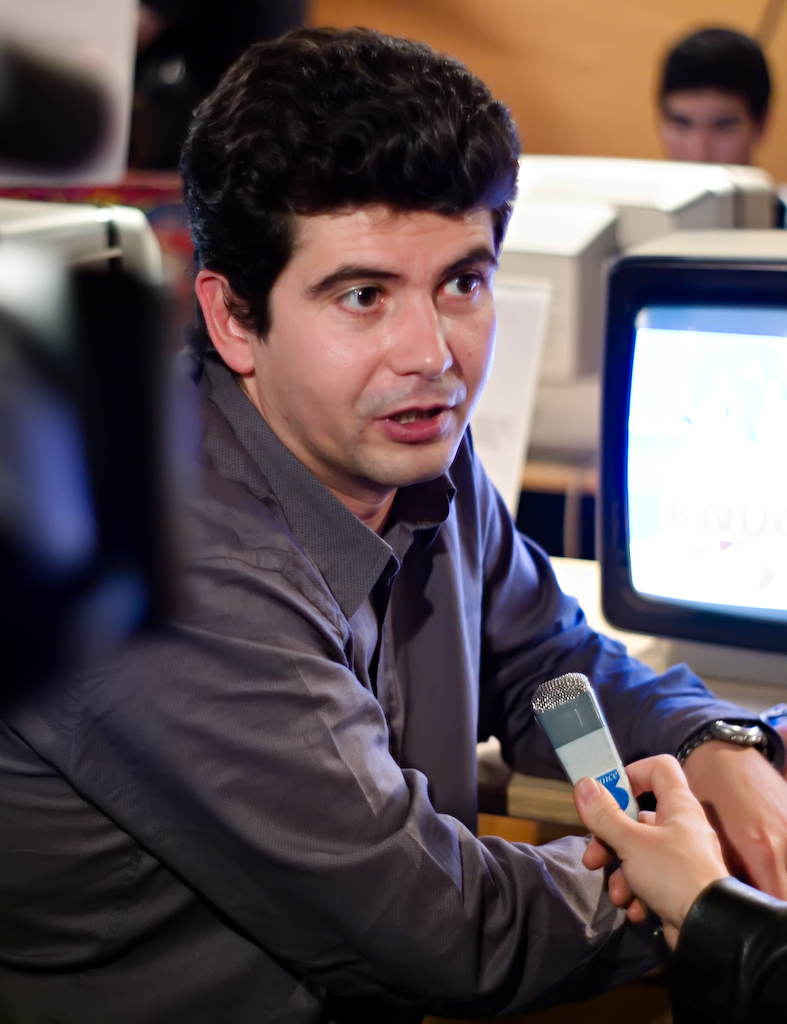
Alone in the Dark was directed by Infogrames programmer Frédérick Raynal (pictured in 2007).

In 1991, the French video game developer Infogrames acquired the rights to adapt Chaosium's Call of Cthulhu role-playing game (based on H. P. Lovecraft's Cthulhu Mythos) into a series of video games. When brainstorming ideas for what an adaptation would entail, Infogrames CEO Bruno Bonnell proposed a game where players would use matches to gain snapshot views of a completely dark environment. Frédérick Raynal, a programmer at Infogrames, was struck by the concept. As a fan of horror film directors like Dario Argento and George A. Romero, Raynal had long wanted to create a horror-based game, and so he approached Bonnell, asking if he could lead the project. Raynal also proposed that the game be rendered using 3D animation. However, Bonnell felt that such a game was not possible, given the technical limitations of the time, and so he assigned Raynal to work on a French port of Maxis's city-building simulator SimCity (1989). Despite this setback, Raynal was determined to realize his horror game concept, and to convince Bonnell that such a project was feasible, he—with the help of fellow Infogrames employee Didier Chanfray—spent his evenings working on a 3D animation engine to power the game.

Chanfray played a significant role in developing the nascent game's tone and visual style during this stage of production. Using white chalk and black Canson paper, he created a concept sketch of an individual standing in a dark, eerie hallway, illuminating the environment with a lantern—a sketch that Raynal later called "iconic". To determine the set decorator, Raynal organized an internal contest among Infogrames' staff, inviting them to design potential background sets for the game. One of those who participated in this contest was Yaël Barroz, a graphic artist nearing the end of her fixed-term contract with Infogrames. Barroz's submissions emulated the style of traditional paintings, and Raynal found them so striking that he brought her on to help develop the look of the game's environments.

In September 1991, Raynal and his team presented an early proof of concept of their horror game to Infogrames. At the time, the game only contained a few rooms, but when Bonnell and Infogrames head of productions Éric Motet saw this demo, they were convinced of the game's potential for success and officially approved the project. Infogrames subsequently diverted resources to Raynal's project, which resulted in the development team expanding from three individuals to seven. (Note: Viz., Frédérick Raynal, Didier Chanfray, Yaël Barroz, Franck De Girolami, Philippe Vachey, Hubert Chardot, and Franck Manzetti) During this phase of production, the game went by several working titles, including In the Dark, Screams in the Dark, The Old Dark House, The Thing in the House, and The Evil Fear. The name Alone in the Dark was eventually settled upon, with the word "Alone" being added to "reinforce the tragic nature" of the game.

=== Writing and animation ===
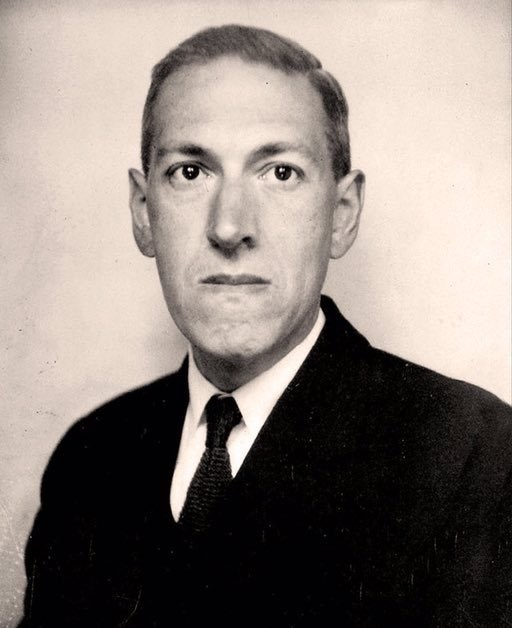
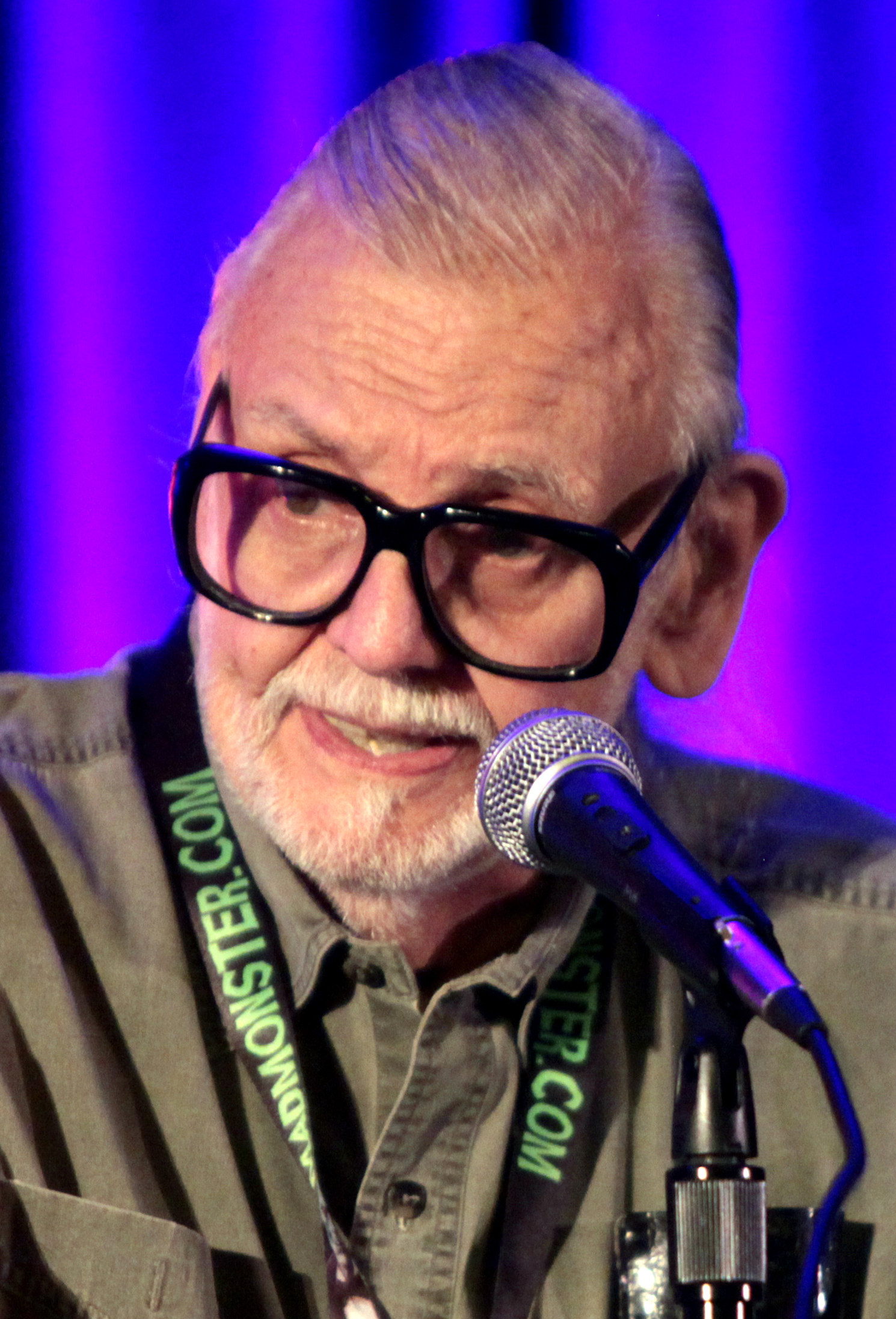
The story to Alone in the Dark was inspired by the Cthulhu Mythos of H. P. Lovecraft (left) and the work of horror director George A. Romero (right), among others.

To help develop the story, Infogrames hired Hubert Chardot, a screenwriter who had worked for 20th Century Fox. Chardot outlined the plot in only three afternoons, and he also wrote most of the dialogue. While Alone in the Dark would go on to be advertised as a game "inspired by the work of H. P. Lovecraft", Raynal has admitted the works of Argento and Romero were stronger influences on the game and that Lovecraft was used to provide "ambiance, to give roots to the mystery and to add a few creatures to the bestiary". This decision to allude to the author's creations rather than directly adapt one of his works led Chaosium to contend that the game was "too far removed from the spirit of H. P. Lovecraft", and so they subsequently revoked Infogrames' Call of Cthulhu license. Other sources claim that Chaosium revoked their license because they believed Raynal's game to be too simple to do justice to the complex rules of their pen-and-paper game.

Due to his belief that computer graphics at the time were not sufficiently frightening on their own, Raynal decided to integrate key texts into the game which could convey necessary backstory details: "A few polygons", he noted in an interview with GamaSutra, "[is] not very frightening, so I knew that I needed the text to put the situation into a very heavy background story for the game." In terms of the setting, Raynal also decided that the game should take place in a 1920s mansion, as such an expansive locale would be conducive to player exploration, and the specific time frame would allow "for weapons while avoiding the modern commodities that were too difficult to properly handle" or which would have "caused atmosphere and consistency problems". To heighten player anxiety, the game was designed so that simple tasks like walking down a hall, opening a door, or reading a book could potentially result in death. While these deaths occurred in only a few areas, Raynal and his team included them to make the player worry about seemingly ordinary actions.

This brief video, which depicts Carnby walking through the Derceto mansion, illustrates Alone in the Dark's fixed camera angle system. While this system was necessitated by the technical limitations at the time, the designers nevertheless used it to frame scenes and build tension.

Items and characters in Alone in the Dark are three-dimensional objects, with characters averaging around 250 polygons. These 3D objects are rendered upon a two-dimensional fixed background. Due to the technical limitations, the mixing of polygons and pre-rendered background images required the use of fixed camera angles—a situation which the designers used to limit the player's field of view, thereby engendering an aura of "apprehension and fear". Raynal had initially wanted to use photos of an actual mansion built in the 1920s as backgrounds, but this idea proved too ambitious for the 3D rendering tools available, and the team instead resorted to using hand-drawn bitmaps.

The soundtrack to Alone in the Dark was created by Infogrames' in-house composer Philippe Vachey with the use of Ad Lib, Inc. sound cards. Vachey's "haunting and organic" score incorporated sonic elements often found in horror soundtracks, including piano hits and plucked strings. Upon Raynal's request, Vachey also created musical compositions that corresponded to each of the monsters. While Raynal intended these tracks to only play whenever a monster appeared on-screen, Vachey proposed that they occasionally play even when an enemy was absent. Vachey reasoned that this would scare the player into thinking they were in danger when they were otherwise perfectly safe. Raynal also wanted the game to have realistic sound effects to heighten its atmosphere, and so Vachey incorporated Sound Blaster audio samples into his sound design. While absent from the original release, the 1993 CD-ROM re-release of Alone in the Dark featured introductory voice-overs.

While most of Alone in the Dark's production cycle was defined by a spirit of optimism and creative enthusiasm, the bug-testing phase wore out the team. Raynal, in particular, grew dissatisfied with almost every aspect of Alone in the Dark and felt certain players would notice all of its flaws. Raynal's mood further declined when, just before release, Bruno Bonnell requested that Raynal replace the line "Game created by Frédérick Raynal" in the credits with "Game created by Infogrames". Raynal complied, but felt as if he was being denied full recognition for his work (a snub he later called "the trauma of [his] life"). After Alone in the Dark proved to be a success, Infogrames tapped Raynal to direct a sequel. However, they demanded that he "keep the same engine", which Raynal felt was too great of a restriction; he and his team left the company soon thereafter.

=== Releases, ports, and remakes ===
Initially released for the MS-DOS operating system, Alone in the Dark was published in 1992 for the European market by Infogrames. The game was released in the United States in 1993 by I•Motion and Interplay Entertainment. That same year, it was released in Japan by Arrow Micro-Techs Corp. for the PC-98 and FM Towns computers. In 1994, the game was ported to Mac OS by MacPlay and to the 3DO by Krisalis, and the following year, Krisalis ported the game to RISC OS for the Acorn Archimedes and the Risc PC. Ports for the Atari Jaguar CD and the 32X were also in development by Infogrames, but were never released. In 2014, Atari released an official port for iOS that had been co-developed by Kung Fu Factory.

Before the release of Alone In The Dark (2008), Eden Games attempted to remake the original game, but after the 2008 installment was met with mediocre reviews, parent company Atari laid off most of Eden's employees and ultimately canceled the game. In August 2022, an announcement was made that a reboot of the original was in development at Pieces Interactive. THQ Nordic, the new owner of the Alone In The Dark franchise, published the game for PlayStation 5, Windows and Xbox Series X/S on 20 March 2024. This remake features the same setting and protagonists as the original, but it has a completely new story written by Mikael Hedberg, a former Frictional Games writer who had worked on Penumbra: Black Plague (2008), Amnesia: The Dark Descent (2010), and SOMA (2015).

== Reception ==
=== Critical reception ===
Reception

Review scores
Publication	Score		
Publication	3DO	DOS	Macintosh
AllGame	N/A	3.5/5	3.5/5
Electronic Gaming Monthly	9/10, 8/10, 7/10, 8/10, 8/10	N/A	N/A
Famitsu	8/10, 8/10, 9/10, 8/10	N/A	N/A
IGN	N/A	6/10	N/A
Next Generation	3/5	N/A	4/5
Tilt	N/A	19/20	N/A
3DO Magazine	4/5	N/A	N/A

Alone in the Dark received positive reviews upon release, with many hailing it as a trailblazing piece of media. Dany Boolauck of the French gaming magazine Tilt called Alone in the Dark "a real revolution in the field of gaming" and compared it positively to other groundbreaking titles like Dungeon Master (1987), Prince of Persia (1989), and Another World. Next Generation called Alone in the Dark "a breakthrough game", and AllGame wrote that, among the games released in the early 1990s, Alone in the Dark "stands out as a graphical gem".

Several critics wrote highly of the atmosphere and sound design. In a review of the 3DO version of the game, Next Generation said "Alone's subtle mix of eerie music, grim animation sequences, and suspense-filled storyline create an atmosphere of tense horror that adds an interesting new twist to the standard graphic adventure." Charles Ardai, in his review for Computer Gaming World, applauded the frightening ambiance, which he claimed caused him to "jump in fright at the slightest sound [as if he had] been inside a real house". In the same issue of Computer Gaming World, Scorpia commended the designers for "establishing mood" through key interactables and for utilizing sound "to good effect". Similarly, GamePro's Lawrence Neves lauded the sound design, noting that "weird moaning, zombie laughter, and occasional hands-around-the-throat screams instill the right mood". Neves also held that the sparing use of music effectively enhanced key scenes.

Alone in the Dark's fixed camera angle system also engendered critical discussion, specifically regarding its similarity to horror film cinematography. Jacob Blackford of Computer Shopper praised this system, asserting that it created an "engaging, movie-like" environment. Similarly, a review in Computer Gaming World noted that the "clever use of camera angles" added a "startlingly cinematic touch" to the overall experience. In her review, Scorpia called the camera system a "unique feature". "Years of watching horror movies", she wrote, "have taught us that when the viewing perspective changes, it usually means that something is up". For this reason, she argued that Alone in the Dark's decision to integrate perspective changes into the game "very effectively [keeps the player] alert and worried over what's about to happen". In a retrospective consideration of the game, John Cantees of GamingBolt wrote that the use of fixed camera angles was "a great way to set a cinematic tone" while also "work[ing] within the very tight technical limitations of the time."

Conversely, criticism was aimed at the compatibility of the game's fixed camera angle system with some of its more action-heavy set pieces. Scorpia, for instance, wrote: "There are some situations where maneuvering the character while the angles change can make your life difficult. Imagine running around narrow library corridors while being chased by a critter ... while the perspective changes constantly as you move." Other criticisms were aimed at the ambiguity about which monsters can be killed, the existence of interactables that can kill the player without warning, the game's linear design, and the look of its monsters.

=== Sales ===
According to PC Research, Alone in the Dark was the second best-selling MS-DOS game of March 1993. In February 1997, it was reported that Alone in the Dark had sold 600,000 copies, and by January 2000, that number had grown to 2.5 million.

=== Accolades ===
Alone in the Dark won numerous gaming and industry awards, including the European Computer Trade Show awards for "Best Graphics", "Most Original Game", and "Best French Game of the Year" (1993), and the Consumer Electronics Show award for "Best Foreign Game" (1993).

Alone in the Dark has been included on lists of the best video games ever made by Computer Gaming World, Empire, Game Informer, GamesMaster, GameSpot, Gameswelt, IGN, PC Gamer, Polygon, and Stuff magazine. The game was also included in Cassell Illustrated's reference book 1001 Video Games You Must Play Before You Die (2010).

== Legacy ==
Alone in the Dark was followed by seven more games in the series: Jack in the Dark (1993), Alone in the Dark 2 (1993), Alone in the Dark 3 (1995), Alone in the Dark: The New Nightmare (2001), Alone in the Dark (2008), Alone in the Dark: Illumination (2015), and Alone in the Dark (2024). The game also inspired two live-action films: Alone in the Dark (2005) and Alone in the Dark II (2008).

Alone in the Dark is often heralded as the first 3D survival horror game, and some commentators have asserted that it was the first survival horror game regardless of graphical perspective. Critics have also credited Alone in the Dark with setting the standard for subsequent survival horror games by popularizing limited player inventory, a heavy focus on puzzle-solving, an emphasis on survival rather than direct combat, and the use of fixed camera angles.

During the production of Capcom's 1996 horror game Resident Evil, the game's director Shinji Mikami discovered Alone in the Dark. Mikami believed that the cinematic fixed-view camera system enabled "greater expressiveness" and a higher level of detail than what was currently possible in fully 3D games, and so he decided to adopt a fixed-view camera system for his project. In several interviews, Mikami has stated that, if it were not for Alone in the Dark, the inaugural Resident Evil would have likely become a first‑person horror game.
