= Ted Stryker =

Ted Stryker may refer to:

- Stryker (disc jockey)
- A character from Alone in the Dark 2
- Ted Stryker, a character from Zero Hour!
- Ted Striker, a character from Airplane!
