= RKSS =

Canadian filmmaking trio

- Company type: Filmmaking collective
- Founded: 2004; 22 years ago
- Headquarters: Quebec, Canada
- Key people: Anouk Whissell; Yoann-Karl Whissell; François Simard (until 2024)

RKSS, an initialism for Roadkill Superstars, is a filmmaking duo consisting of Canadian film directors Anouk Whissell and Yoann-Karl Whissell.

They are known for writing and directing their debut feature film Turbo Kid (2015) and for directing the horror mystery film Summer of 84 (2018).

== History ==
The group have been making short films since the mid-2000s, and cited their 2004 short Le Bagman as the first that "got an audience to follow [their] work", additionally crediting Total Fury (2007) and Demonitron (2010) as projects that further defined their style and technique.

In 2011, the trio submitted a short to the anthology film The ABCs of Death, which features 26 short films based on each letter of the English alphabet. The film's producers Ant Timpson and Tim League held a competition seeking unknown directors to create a short for the letter "T", and the group submitted T is for Turbo, which placed third in the competition and was included on the film's home release. Impressed with their work, Timpson approached them to develop the short into the feature film Turbo Kid. Jason Eisener, who directed the Y is for Youngbuck section of the anthology, also supported RKSS at the Fantasia International Film Festival's Frontieres Co-Production Market in 2013. Turbo Kid premiered at the 2015 Sundance Film Festival and was theatrically released on August 28, 2015, by Epic Pictures Group.

RKSS signed to an agency after the success of Turbo Kid, and during a "tour of meetings" were approached by production company assistant Matt Leslie, who pitched them the idea for Summer of 84. Leslie and co-writer Stephen J. Smith described the film's ending to the trio, and they signed on to direct. With the unexpected release and subsequent success of the Netflix series Stranger Things in 2016, the group was afraid of possible similarities between the two projects. Anouk Whissell watched the series and found it "very different", with only a reference to the tabletop role-playing game Dungeons & Dragons removed from Summer of 84 as a result. The film premiered at the 2018 Sundance Film Festival, and received a simultaneous release in August 2018. That October, it was released to streaming as a Shudder-exclusive film.

On November 1st 2024, François Simard was removed from the collective following criminal accusations.

=== Future projects ===
In January 2015, the group said that they were developing a revenge film titled Elora. That August, they were preparing a pitch for that film, now referred to as Elora's Death Wish, along with an adaptation of the comic book series The Zombies That Ate the World.

In September 2016, RKSS directed a music video for Le Matos' song "No Tomorrow", which also served as a prequel to Turbo Kid and featured Laurence Leboeuf reprising her role as Apple. The next day, they confirmed that a sequel had been greenlit and that they hoped to begin filming by mid-2017. By August 2018, the group confirmed the film was still in development and that they were "deep in the writing process" for it. In February 2020, Timpson said that the script was finished and the crew was seeking financiers as the sequel requires "a little bit more money than [they] had for the first film". In 2018, the group was also writing adaptations of two comics books, with Yoann-Karl Whissell saying that one is a horror comic and the other is about zombies.

== Filmography ==
Year	Title	Director	Writer	Role(s)
2015	Turbo Kid	Yes	Yes	The Father (François Simard); The Mother (Anouk Whissell); Bald Guard (Yoann-Karl Whissell)
2018	Summer of 84	Yes	No	—N/a
2023	We Are Zombies	Yes	Yes	
2023	Wake Up	Yes	No	
