= Baker Street (comics) =

Comic book by Gary Reed and Guy Davis

Publication information
- Publisher: Caliber Comics
- Format: Limited series
- Genre: Alternate history
- Publication date: March 1989 - February 1991
- No. of issues: 10

Creative team
- Created by: Gary Reed; Guy Davis
- Written by: Gary Reed (1-5); Guy Davis
- Penciller: Guy Davis
- Inker(s): Vince Locke; Alan Oldham; Guy Davis
- Letterer(s): Dan McKinnon; Vince Locke; Kathy Thomas
- Editor(s): Bryan Andrews; Deb McKinnon; Chester Jacques; Gary Reed

Collected editions
- Honour Among Punks: The Complete Baker Street Graphic Novel: ISBN 1-59687-802-9

Baker Street is a ten-issue comic book series created by Gary Reed and Guy Davis, and published by Caliber Comics between 1989 and 1991.

== Publication history ==
The series consists of two story arcs "Honour Among Punks" written by Reed and Davis and "Children of the Night" written by Davis alone, who also provided the bulk of the art (with some early fill-in inking).

== Plot ==
Baker Street features an alternative Sherlock Holmes world where the values and class system of Victorian era England carried over into a late 20th century where World War II never occurred. The story mainly concerns a group of punks attempting to solve a series of murders reminiscent of the Jack the Ripper killings of the late 19th century.

== Collected editions ==
Ten issues were published and collected in two trade paperbacks (one for each story arc) by Caliber:

- Honour Among Punks (collects Baker Street #1-5, 175 pages, 1993, ISBN 0-941613-42-9)
- Children of the Night (collects Baker Street #6-10, 178 pages, 1993, ISBN 0-941613-43-7)

and then as a single volume:

- Honour Among Punks (iBooks, 352 pages, 2003, paperback, ISBN 0-7434-5904-0, hardcover, ISBN 0-7434-7993-9)
- Honour Among Punks: The Complete Baker Street Graphic Novel (Milk and Cookies Press, paperback, 368 pages, 2008, ISBN 1-59687-802-9)

== Awards ==
- 1990: Nominated for "Best New Series" Harvey Award

== See also ==
- Sherlock Holmes pastiches
- List of steampunk works
