= Gary Reed (comics) =

American comics publisher and writer

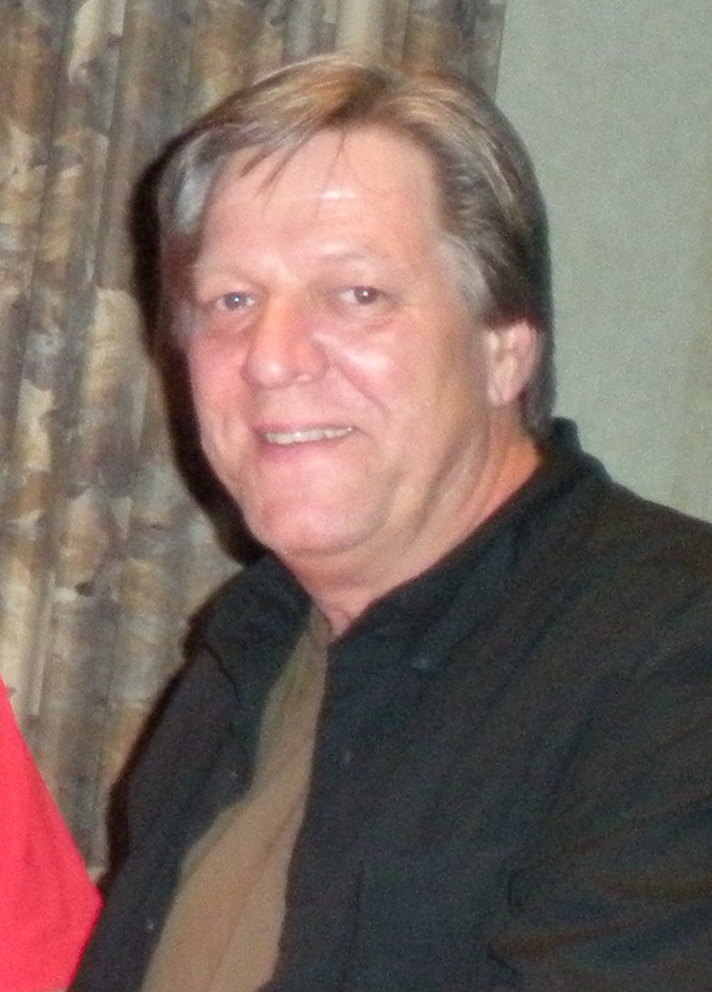
- Gary Reed in 2009
- Born: May 21, 1956 Detroit, Michigan, U.S.
- Died: October 3, 2016 (aged 60)
- Areas: Writer, Editor, Publisher
- Pseudonyms: Kyle Garrett; Brent Truax; Randall Thayer
- Notable works: Baker Street; Deadworld
- Awards: Shel Dorf Award, 2012
- Spouse: Jennifer
- Children: 4

Gary Reed (May 21, 1956 – October 3, 2016) was an American comic book writer, and the publisher of Caliber Comics, an independent comic book company that released 1,300 titles in the 1990s and published early work by many popular creators. Reed wrote over 200 comics and graphic novels, sometimes under assumed names (including Kyle Garrett, Brent Truax, and Randall Thayer). He was also Vice President of McFarlane Toys when the company launched in 1993. His comics writing credits include Saint Germaine, Baker Street and Deadworld. In addition to comics, Reed wrote a role-playing game for Palladium and wrote some of the storyline scenarios for Final Fight: Streetwise for Capcom.

== Biography ==
=== Early life and education ===
Gary Reed was born in 1956 and raised in Detroit, Michigan. He grew up in the projects in Detroit and graduated from Redford High School, attending community college at night while working to put his wife through school at the University of Michigan. Reed opened his first bookstore while still a student at Eastern Michigan University. By the time he graduated with his Master's degree (in biology, specializing in molecular genetics), he had four stores that specialized in used books, comic books, and other popular culture items.

=== King Kon ===
In 1984, while still a graduate student, Reed launched the King Kon Comic & Fantasy Convention, an annual event celebrating comics and pop culture. It was the first regular comic book convention in the Detroit area since the demise of the Detroit Triple Fan Fair in 1977. During this time he also did a weekly radio show and television show on public-access television. With the arrival of his first daughter, Reed discontinued King Kon after the 1986 show. In 2010, Reed would join Detroit Fanfare Conventions as an adviser and serve on its board of directors.

=== Caliber Comics ===
In 1989, Reed launched Caliber Comics, an independent publishing company which gave exposure at an early stage of their careers to many of today’s top comics talents, including Brian Michael Bendis, David W. Mack, Vince Locke, Guy Davis, Michael Lark, Patrick Zircher, Jim Calafiore, Ed Brubaker, Michael Gaydos, James O'Barr, Kevin VanHook and Mike Carey. The initial titles were Deadworld, Realm, Caliber Presents, Moontrap, The Crow, and Baker Street (a series co-created by Reed with Guy Davis). Reed and Davis were nominated for a Harvey Award for Best New Series for Baker Street. Baker Street was later nominated for another Harvey Award, for a collection put out by iBooks. During this time, Reed also became vice president of McFarlane Toys for the first three years of that company’s existence. Reed sold the last of his comics shops and ceased publishing in 2000. He started teaching at Henry Ford Community College as an adjunct professor.

=== Return to comics ===
Reed concentrated on his teaching until 2004, when he started working with Byron Preiss, who contracted to reprint all of the issues of Baker Street in a single collection to be distributed by Simon & Schuster. Reed was brought in to write graphic novel adaptations of the classic horror novels from Penguin Books. Frankenstein and Dracula were released before Preiss died in a car accident, and the line was canceled.

In 2006, Reed wrote a young adult novel for the new Actionopolis line. His Spirit of the Samurai was the first in a series of books featuring a young heroine with an ancestry she never knew she had. He also wrote a series of children's stories for Magic Wagon Publishing, a company specializing in children's literature for libraries.

=== Desperado/Image ===
In 2005 and 2006, Reed launched a new series of Deadworld through Desperado Publishing and Image Comics, and brought back many of the Caliber titles with Image, such as Red Diaries, Saint Germaine, and Renfield. In 2009, he released A Murder of Scarecrows through Desperado as well as a hardcover original tale of Deadworld in Slaughterhouse with art by Hatter M's Sami Makkonen.

=== Transfuzion Publishing ===
In 2007, Reed formed a new company with fellow writer Rafael Nieves called Transfuzion Publishing, which collected many of his previous work into compilations, and also published new material. The company released graphic novels collecting Reed's works and also series on H.P. Lovecraft, Vietnam Journal, Chillers anthology, and others. Night Pieces, a collection of Reed's short stories, and the last Transfuzion release, was selected by horror journalist Decapitated Dan as the best archival collection of 2013.

=== IDW ===
Deadworld has had most of its recent issues released from IDW, including the two Classics, the Omnibus, and the last two mini-series: Deadworld: War of the Dead and Deadworld: Restoration. War of the Dead was nominated as Best Mini-Series for 2012 from Comic Monsters.com and Shel Dorf Awards. It won the Ghastly Award for Best Mini-Series the same year. Reed also had Curious Cases of Sherlock Holmes released by IDW.

At one point Deadworld had been signed up for a film, with David Hayter (Watchmen, X-Men) providing the script, but Reed announced in January 2014 that he had not renewed the option and he was looking to move Deadworld to another producer.

=== Binary Publications ===
Reed teamed up with Paul Burke, his former partner at Stabur Press, to launch Binary Publishing, a line of books centered on pop culture. Featuring titles centered on The Rocky Horror Picture Show and cartoonists such as Jack Davis. Reed wrote the young adult tale Zelda’s Zombie Zoo for Binary.

=== Caliber Comics relaunch ===
In 2014, Reed announced that he was bringing Caliber Comics back, in a partnership formed with Eagle One Media’s Eric Reichart. The relaunched company released collections of material originally published by Caliber in addition to all new material.

== Personal life ==
Reed lived in a suburb of Detroit with his wife, Jennifer. They had four daughters. In addition to his freelance writing, Reed taught various biology-related courses at several community colleges in his area. In 2012, Reed was presented with a special Shel Dorf Award for his contributions to the comic industry.

He died unexpectedly on October 3, 2016, from a heart attack.

== Legacy ==
Shortly after Reed's death, the Traverse City, Michigan-based Cherry Capital Comic Con created an award named in Reed's honor, the Gary Reed Independent Creator of the Year Award.

Winners include:

- 2017 Seth Damoose
- 2018 Dan Dougherty
- 2019 Travis McIntire
- 2020 Kasey Pierce
- 2021 Joshua Werner
- 2022 Joe Pruett
- 2023 Doug Wood
- 2024 Corinne Roberts

== Bibliography ==
Comics work includes:

- A Murder of Scarecrows (Desperado)
- Baker Street (Caliber)
- Book of the Tarot (Tome Press)
- Cortez and the Fall of the Aztecs (Tome Press)
- Deadworld: Requiem for the World (Image)
- Deadworld: The Dead-Killer (Image)
- Deadworld Chronicles (Desperado)
- Deadworld: Slaughterhouse (Desperado)
- Deadworld Classics 1 and 2 (IDW)
- Deadworld: War of the Dead (IDW)
- Deadworld: Restoration (IDW)
- Deadworld: Voices from the Deadworld (Transfuzion)
- Dracula (Penguin)
- Frankenstein (Penguin)
- Ghost Sonata (Transfuzion)
- Helsing (Transfuzion)
- Honour Among Punks: Complete Baker Street (iBooks)
- Jack London's Call of the Wild (Magic Wagon)
- Jack the Ripper (Transfuzion)
- Magus (Caliber)
- Night Pieces (Transfuzion)
- Of Scenes and Stories (Transfuzion)
- Pandora (Magic Wagon)
- Raven Chronicles (Transfuzion)
- Realm (Caliber)
- The Red Diaries (Image)
- Renfield (Image)
- The Red Revolution (Tome Press)
- Saint Germaine (Image, Transfuzion)
- Seeker: Identity Crisis (Transfuzion)
- Sherlock Holmes' Curious Cases (IDW)
- Sherlock Holmes: Murder at Moulin Rouge (Transfuzion)
- Sin Eternal: Return to Dante's Inferno (Transfuzion)
- Song of the Cid (Tome Press)
- Spirit of the Samurai (Actionopolis)
- The Call of the Wild (Magic Wagon)
- Troy: An Empire in Siege (Tome Press)
- True Spy Stories (Tome Press)
- Zelda's Zombie Zoo (Binary)
- Zulunation: End of Empire (Transfuzion)
