= Lucha Libre (comics) =

Anthology comic book series by Jerry Frissen

- Cover of the first issue

Publication information
- Publisher: Les Humanoïdes Associés
- Format: Ongoing series
- Genre: Humor/comedy
- Publication date: August 2006 – present
- No. of issues: 11

Creative team
- Written by: Jerry Frissen
- Artist(s): Bill (The Luchadores Five); Witko (Profesor Furia); Tanquerelle, Romuald Reutimann (Luchadoritos); Gobi (Tequila); Fabien M (Tikitis); Christophe Gaultier (El Gladiador)
- Colourist: Lucie Firoud
- Editor: Robert Silva

Collected editions
- Introducing: The Luchadores Five: ISBN 2-7316-1800-0
- Volume 1: ISBN 1607060280

Lucha Libre is an anthology comic book series written by Jerry Frissen. It is published in France by Les Humanoïdes Associés and reprinted in North America by Image Comics. It is also published in Spain, Italy and Korea. It is regularly illustrated by Gobi, Bill, Fabien M., Hervé Tanquelle, Nikola Witko, Romuald Reutimann, Christophe Gaultier along with several other guest artists.

== Publication history ==
The Image Comics translation started in September 2007 and a first trade paperback collecting the first three stories of The Luchadores Five, Tequila and The Tikitis was released in 2008 under the title Heroing's A Full Time Job (Tips Appreciated).

== Stories ==
=== Luchadores 5 ===
A group of five middle aged Mexican men don wrestling masks and protect East L.A., together they face the likes of stereo stealing werewolves, Tiki warriors, deep sea greasers and rude gun-toting rednecks. The Luchadores 5 never take their masks off and only respond to their wrestling names. Although they consider themselves superheroes, most people think of them as overgrown nerds. The first Luchadores 5 story appeared in the pages of Métal Hurlant.

=== Tequila ===
Tequila faces the daily rigors of married life in a trailer park, but is forced to go on the run after being framed for the apparent murder of his friend Walter.

=== Luchadoritos ===
The short misadventures of a young professional wrestling obsessed boy named Melindez and his indifferent friends. The word Luchadoritos isn't grammatically accurate, it should be Luchadorsitos, but is spelled incorrectly as a pun.

=== Professor Furia ===
Follows the exploits of a corrupt and inept wrestling teacher who regularly physically abuses and takes advantage of his gullible students.

=== The Tikitis ===
A team of supposedly science minded superheroes who have retired to a small island in the South Pacific and charged with preventing its strongest resident 'King Katch' from leaving the island.

=== Covers ===
Also featured in the anthology are a series of comic book covers depicting the supposedly past adventures of the Luchadores 5, Tequila, El Panda and the Pom Pom Ninjas, among others. In contrast to the satirical stories portrayed, the covers seem to display the 'Golden' and 'Silver' Age exploits of the Lucha Libre Cast; Implying that their current stories are of them past their prime.

== Characters ==
El Gladiador: The de facto leader of the Luchadores Five. Since he is supported by his parents he is able to dedicate all of his focus to crime fighting and chastises his teammates for not having the same devotion. He is something of a braggart and has been known to wildly exaggerate his romantic conquests. Despite considering himself and his team the protectors of East L.A, he has no qualms about tipping off the police when the odds look unfavorable.

Doctor Pantera: The only married member of the Luchadores 5. He is overweight, wears a Harvard sweatshirt and a mask with a leopard print design. He and his wife Suzy are trying to have a baby. He has a difficult time justifying his crime fighting career to his wife, who seldom believes any of his adventures are real. King Karateca accuses him of being the weakest of the group due to Pantera's weight, although he is rather spry in combat.

Red Demon: The team's token smooth operator, he is the most stylish of the bunch and has no trouble picking up women despite always wearing a dorky mask. He claims to have developed a technique that allows him to date three women at once, without making any of them question his fidelity. Has trouble maintaining a relationship over long periods of time.

Diablo Loco: Lives with his mother and can usually be found with a cigar in his mouth. A party animal, he is usually in a cheerful gait while his teammates brood.

King Karateca: The only member of the Luchadores 5 with a background in martial arts. Karateca is considered to be the strongest of the Luchadores 5 (possibly since the dismissal of Tequila) and regularly questions the decisions of El Gladiador, not so much out of necessity but principle. He has an affinity for plants and in turn only eats meat.

Dr. Destruction: The leader of the French super hero team Les Formidables. He is a big fan of Fantomas and owns a Citroen CX he claims once belonged to Charles de Gaulle. However, he has displayed a great deal of fallacious knowledge that borders absurdity; he believed that the France defeated Britain in World War II and is under the impression that J.K Rowling, Shakespeare, and Stephen King are French authors. Les Formidables' exploits range from acts of cultural vandalism (that is, attacking establishments they deem Anti-French), helping the needy and oppressed, to outright 'heroic' deeds, usually at the expense of their luchador counterparts.

Tequila: A gargantuan and powerful former wrestler raised by cacti in the wild deserts of Mexico. Tequila wears a cactus shaped mask and a tattered sarape, he also carries a bottle containing the distilled remains of his downed cactus family and drinks it when he needs a special boost of strength. He was once a member of the Luchadores 5 although he seems to have had a falling out with El Gladiador. He has since renounced heroism and lives in a trailer park with his loving (albeit feisty) wife.

Cheryl Goldstein: Tequila's wife, despite her small stature she has no problem controlling Tequila with her expletive filled tirades. Though dedicated to her husband, she expresses disappointment in him, citing that he could've become a successful wrestler, instead of collecting food stubs for a living.

El Panda: A communist Panda themed wrestler who claims to be Chinese despite the fact he doesn't speak the language and only repeats a series of vaguely Chinese sounding nonsense words. El Panda is accompanied by a genuinely Chinese man who translates his jargon, though, he doesn't understand Panda either and merely dictates what he feels like. He is Tequila's childhood nemesis and remains unintimidated at the prospect of confronting him.

Paquito Furioso: The world's most irritable man, ex-hairdresser turned wrestler and Cheryl's former husband, he hates Tequila with a passion for stealing his wife (who in turn, stole his car). A passionate dancer, he frequents clubs and other dance haunts, though is given a wide berth as his dancing becomes so violent he is capable of injuring everyone around him. Despite his violent and formidable reputation, he is easily dispatched by Cheryl.

Stacy K: The leader of the Pom Pom Ninjas, a band of vengeful cheerleader shinobi. She has a personal grudge against Tequila. Rumor has it, that she knows El Gladiador's secret identity.

Walter Van Krrh: Tequila's friend and neighbor, who never removes his slippers (which hide his reputedly, hideous feet) and only wears shirts with the sleeves cut off to showcase his less than impressive arm muscles. Walter is Belgian and bears a strong resemblance to Jerry Frissen. It is stated in his bio that he left Belgium after being accused of cannibalism during his tenure as a railroad worker. Despite being out of shape, he was able to hold his own against Tequila in a fight concerning the latter's cooking and walked away with little injury. He is brutally beaten near the beginning of the story by an unknown assailant, who is attempting to frame Tequila for multiple crimes.

== References to real life wrestling ==
- One of the Luchadoritos pin ups features Melindez inserted into the poster for "Santo Contra Las Mujeres Vampiro".
- The first issue features an article on the history of pro wrestling in Mexico. El Santo is mentioned but the picture used of him is of his earlier days as a heel named El Hombre Rojo.

== Cultural references ==
- El Gladiador drives a Pontiac Firebird.
- The first Citroën CX was released in 1974, unless he is referring to his grandson it is unlikely Dr Destruction's car ever belonged to Charles de Gaulle who died in 1969.
- When Gojira is in the dump the homeless men sing Lonesome Town by Ricky Nelson.
- Tequila somewhat resembles Marvel Comics anti-hero Hulk and also speaks in a similar manner.
- All of the members of the Pom Pom Ninjas, except for chubby Kimberly, share the name Stacy. This is reminiscent of the eponymous popular clique in the movie Heathers.

== References to others works by Catfish Studio ==
- El Gladiador appears in a single panel of Bill and Gobi's Zblucops strip for Tchô! magazine.
- The appearance of Doctor Pantera's wife Suzy changes drastically from the first time she is seen in issue 1. By the time she is show again in issue 4 she resembles Zblucops character Valentine, both in hairstyle and violent demeanor apparently.
- El Panda dresses similarly to Dragon Ball character Oolong, both sport slacks, suspenders and a Chairman Mao Zedong styled cap. Bill and Gobi are fans of Dragon Ball creator Akira Toriyama, Zblucops is influenced by Toriyama's Dr Slump.

== Collected editions ==
Albums from Humanoids include:

1. Introducing: The Luchadores Five (48 pages, 2006, ISBN 2-7316-1800-0)
2. Se llama Tequila! (48 pages, 2006, ISBN 2-7316-1815-9)
3. Hele mei hoohiwahiwa: Les Tikitis (48 pages, 2007, ISBN 2-7316-1920-1)
4. I wanna be your Luchadorito (64 pages, 2007, ISBN 978-2-7316-1970-6)
5. Diablo Loco a disparu! (56 pages, 2007, ISBN 978-2-7316-2070-2)
6. Traité de savoir-vivre (54 pages, 2008, ISBN 978-2-7316-2129-7)
7. On dirait le sud (49 pages, 2008, ISBN 978-2-7316-2164-8)
8. Pop-culture mythologique (56 pages, 2008, ISBN 978-2-7316-2182-2)
9. Catchéchisme (56 pages, 2008, ISBN 978-2-7316-2213-3)
10. Surfin' USA (56 pages, 2009, ISBN 978-2-7316-2222-5)

The English translations are being collected into trade paperbacks:

- Lucha Libre: Volume 1 (collects Lucha Libre #1-6, 160 pages, Image Comics, November 2008, ISBN 1-60706-028-0)

== Awards and recognition ==
- Lucha Libre was nominated for a 2008 Eisner Awards in the Best Humor Publication category.

== Merchandise ==
There is also a line of wrestling art toys manufactured by Muttpop and featuring vinyl representations of characters from the series. The toy line is notable for being made available before the first issues of wrestling were published. Muttpop produced toys of four of the Mexico's professional wrestling characters, Tequila, El Panda, Red Demon and Dr. Destruction. Various Repaints of the original toys have been made including several designs by Frank Kozik.

== Other media ==
- A Luchadores 5 live action film is in the early stages of production.
- An original Tequila art toy adorns the work area of Judah Friedlander's character in the NBC sitcom 30 Rock.
- A Luchadores 5 video game option has been acquired by Biodroid Entertainment

== See also ==
- Lucha libre
- ¡Mucha Lucha!, animated series about luchadores
- The Haunted World of El Superbeasto, a comic book and animated series by Rob Zombie
- Sonambulo, a comic book series combining lucha libre and noir
