= Alone in the Dark: Illumination =

2015 video game

- Developer: Pure FPS
- Publisher: Atari Inc.
- Director: Jason Brice
- Writer: Matthew Barcas
- Composer: Jeffrey Brice
- Series: Alone in the Dark
- Engine: Unreal Engine 4
- Platform: Microsoft Windows
- Release: June 11, 2015
- Genre: Third-person shooter
- Modes: Single-player, multiplayer

Alone in the Dark: Illumination is a 2015 third-person shooter video game developed by Pure FPS and published by Atari for Microsoft Windows. The game is the sixth installment of the Alone in the Dark series.

It received negative reviews from critics and was the last title in the series to be published by Atari, as the intellectual property has since been acquired from Atari SA by THQ Nordic.

== Gameplay ==
The game is an up-to-four-player cooperative experience with four distinct player characters working together to solve a mystery in an action-horror setting. Some characters wield firearms whereas others use magical abilities. Players make their way through levels with randomly generated elements such as enemy locations, locked doors, or even room layouts to make their way to a safety vault at the end of the level. Throughout it, the players will have to fight off various types of enemies by means of firepower and creating light-sources to defeat them.

== Plot ==
The game brings players to the abandoned town of Lorwich, Virginia. Located near Virginia's southern border, Lorwich was a flourishing industrial town with a bustling business generated by the local coal mines. Those prosperous days came to an end when a flood devastated the mining facility, leaving behind nothing but destruction in its wake. The disaster forced an immediate evacuation, leaving the town desolate. It has been years since the accident, and the town has long been forgotten.

The cause of the accident is still a mystery and, years later, nobody dares to step a foot in the town for fear of what lies there. There have been numerous reports of strange creatures and a dark, brooding fog within the town. Some locals who believe in the supernatural say that there lurks an ever-present force known as The Darkness. The Darkness is said to envelop everything in its path and can reveal itself in many ways, such as fog, apparitions, and creatures.

The main source of the Darkness plaguing Lorwich is Cthulhu, an ancient being that came from the stars hundreds of millions of years ago with his people to war against the Elder Things of Earth. After the task was completed, Cthulhu retreated to the city of R'lyeh where the rise of the ocean buried him into a death-like slumber. An Obelisk was made to enable Cthulhu to walk the Material World.

Players destroy the Obelisk. However it does not stop Cthulhu from being unleashed into the world. Upon defeat, he is banished back to his dimension. A statement that plays before the credits roll concludes that portals are materializing around Lorwich and that Cthulhu will return one day.

== Characters ==
There are four player characters:

- Theodore "Ted" Carnby (The Hunter) is a direct descendant of Edward Carnby, the male protagonist of the original Alone in the Dark and three of the sequels. He is actually implied to be the original Edward Carnby living under an assumed identity, still alive in the modern era due to the events of the 2008 Alone in the Dark game. He carries 3 automatic weapons as his primary weapons, namely an AK-47, M4, and P90. He also has a flamethrower attached to each primary weapon that can be used to burn enemies, making them vulnerable to damage. His secondary weapon is a pair of revolvers, which fire more slowly than the other characters' secondary weapons.
- Celeste, born Sara Hartwood (The Witch) is the great-granddaughter of Emily Hartwood, the female protagonist of the original game. She is a member of a coven of witches, who has come to Lorwich searching for 3 of her missing comrades. She fights with a pistol as well as a number of magical abilities, such as throwing a bolt of lightning, enchanting light sources so that they burn nearby enemies, and firing a wave of electricity that travels along the ground. She can also release an area-of-effect electrical burst that deals moderate damage and will activate any nearby electrical light sources.
- Gabriella Saunders (The Engineer) is a young woman who has come to Lorwich searching for her missing miner father. Besides her pistol sidearm, her primary weapons are a double-barreled shotgun, a tesla coil device that can be placed on the ground to damage nearby enemies, and a throwing disc that can be triggered to explode. She can also repair electrical light sources after they shut down.
- Father Henry Giger (The Priest) is a Catholic priest who has been sent by the Vatican to investigate the town of Lorwich. He dual-wields a pair of pistols, and can also use a number of holy abilities, such as firing an energy-imbued bullet that stuns an enemy and turns it into a light source, summoning a beam of light from the sky which explodes, and creating a fiery explosion around himself. His melee attacks also set enemies on fire and leave them vulnerable to damage.

== Development ==
Logo for Alone in the Dark: Illumination

The game was in development by Pure FPS under the name Alone in the Dark for an indeterminate time. Originally prepared for announcement in May 2014, the announcement was delayed until August 20, during PAX East of the same year. The official YouTube channel suggested that the original name for the game would have been Alone in the Dark: Online before settling on the final title. The game entered a closed alpha test in mid-August and entered beta later in fall. Beta access was available for a limited time to players who pre-ordered the title from select retailers. The game was released on June 11, 2015. The 'Summer Update 2016' introduced updates to the objective system, player abilities & progression, monster behavior and voiceover for all narrative text.

== Reception ==
Reception

Aggregate score
Aggregator	Score
Metacritic	19/100

Alone in the Dark: Illumination received "overwhelming dislike", according to review aggregator website Metacritic.

Hooked Gamers rated it a 1.5 out of 10, stating "Alone in the Dark is dead, and now fans share the task of burying it away and trying to retain the good memories. Alone In The Dark: Illumination comes across as trying to be a Left 4 Dead 2 and Resident Evil 6 hybrid while doing absolutely nothing right, and favoring to do everything wrong."

== See also ==
- List of video games notable for negative reception
