= Alexandre Nachi =

Canadian actor (born 1993)

Alexandre Nachi (born August 16, 1993) is a Canadian actor born in Montreal and raised in Sainte-Julie, Quebec. He is noted for his supporting role as Arturo in Ricardo Trogi's film 1991, for which he was a Prix Iris nominee for Best Supporting Actor at the 21st Quebec Cinema Awards in 2019.

Nachi began his career as a child actor in 2006 in the mini series "Bon Voyage". He then worked as Freddie Highmore’s voice on camera in "The Spiderwick Chronicles" which help him book his first lead role afterwards in Paolo Barzman’s "Emotional Arithmetic" where he played Gabriel Byrne’s younger role. In Quebec, he appeared in television series such as Sam Chicotte. He has also appeared in films including Emotional Arithmetic, Stonewall, Allure, Fabulous (Fabuleuses), Death of a Ladies' Man and Arlette, and most recently in TV series Les Mecs.
