= Jerry Frissen =

American comic book writer and toy designer

- Born: Thierry Frissen; June 2, 1964 (age 62) Brussels, Belgium
- Areas: Writer, Toy Designer
- Notable works: Lucha Libre; The Zombies That Ate The World; The Metabarons

Jerry Frissen (born Thierry Frissen in Brussels, on June 2, 1964) is an American comic book writer and a toy designer from Los Angeles, California. He has written the anthology comic book series Lucha Libre, The Zombies That Ate The World illustrated by Guy Davis and "The Metabarons", illustrated by Valentin Secher, Niko Henrichon and Esad Ribic.

== Bibliography ==
In English

- Pin-Up Girls From Around the World (with Fred Beltran and Ian Sattler), 2002, Humanoids Publishing
- Lucha Libre #1: Introducing The Luchadores Five, Image Comics
- Lucha Libre #2: ¡Se Llama Tequila!, Image Comics
- Lucha Libre #3: Hele Mei Hoohiwahiwa, Image Comics
- Lucha Libre #4: I Wanna Be Your Luchadorito, Image Comics
- Lucha Libre #5: Diablo Loco Is Missing, Image Comics
- Lucha Libre #6: Etiquette Essentials For Success, Image Comics
- The Zombies That Ate The World 8 issues limited series, Devil's Due
- World War X #1: Helius, Titan Comics
- The Fire of Theseus, 2020, 2 issues, Humanoids Publishing

in French

- Meurtres (avec Jean-Luc Cornette), 1995, Niffle-Cohen
- Pin-Up Girls (with Fred Beltran and Ian Sattler), 2002, Les Humanoïdes Associés
- Les Zombies qui ont mangé le monde, tome 1: Une odeur épouvantable, June 2004, Les Humanoïdes Associés
- Lucien, 25 piges, octobre 2004, Les Humanoïdes Associés
- Les Zombies qui ont mangé le monde, tome 2: Esclaves de l'amour, January 2005, Les Humanoïdes Associés
- Les Zombies qui ont mangé le monde, tome 3: Popypop a disparu, January 2006, Les Humanoïdes Associés
- Lucha Libre #1: Introducing The Luchadores Five, August 2006, Les Humanoïdes Associés
- Lucha Libre #2: ¡Se Llama Tequila!, October 2006, Les Humanoïdes Associés
- Lucha Libre #3: Hele Mei Hoohiwahiwa: Les Tikitis, January 2007, Les Humanoïdes Associés
- Lucha Libre #4: I Wanna Be Your Luchadorito, May 2007, Les Humanoïdes Associés
- Lucha Libre #5: Diablo Loco a disparu, September 2007, Les Humanoïdes Associés
- Les Zombies qui ont mangé le monde, tome 4: La Guerre des papes, January 2008, Les Humanoïdes Associés
- Lucha Libre #6: Traité de savoir-vivre, January 2008, Les Humanoïdes Associés
- Lucha Libre #7: On dirait le sud, April 2008, Les Humanoïdes Associés
- Luuna: Sur les traces de Luuna, June 2008, Soleil Productions
- Lucha Libre #8: Pop culture mythologique, August 2008, Les Humanoïdes Associés
- Luchadores Five #1: La Cité des hommes brisés, August 2008, Les Humanoïdes Associés
- Les Tikitis #1: La Guerre des cerveaux, September 2008, Les Humanoïdes Associés
- Tequila #1: Les Épines de la destruction, October 2008, Les Humanoïdes Associés
- Lucha Libre #9: Cathéchisme, November 2008, Les Humanoïdes Associés
- Lucha Libre #10: Surfin' USA, March 2009, Les Humanoïdes Associés
- Luchadores Five #2: Lucha Beach Party, March 2009, Les Humanoïdes Associés
- Les Tikitis #2: L'Aventure de l'inventif, April 2009, Les Humanoïdes Associés
- Tequila #2: Tant pis pour le sud, May 2008, Les Humanoïdes Associés
- Tequila #2: Tant pis pour le sud, May 2008, réédition, Les Humanoïdes Associés

== Awards ==
Frissen was nominated for the 2008 "Best Humor Publication" Eisner Award.
