= The Marquis (comics) =

American independent comic book series

Publication information
- Publisher: Caliber Comics; Oni Press; Dark Horse Comics
- Format: Limited series
- Genre: Action-horror, dark fantasy
- Publication date: 1997–2009

Creative team
- Created by: Guy Davis
- Written by: Guy Davis
- Artist: Guy Davis

Collected editions
- Danse Macabre: ISBN 1-929998-15-5
- Intermezzo: ISBN 1929998740
- 1 – The Marquis: Inferno: ISBN 978-1595823687

The Marquis is an American independent comic book series written and illustrated by Guy Davis, released by Caliber Comics, Oni Press and Dark Horse Comics.

== Publication history ==
The Marquis was originally published by Caliber Comics where the Les Preludes issue appeared in 1997, followed by the rest of the Danse Macabre series from Oni Comics in 2000. This was followed by a one-shot and a two-issue miniseries in 2002–2003. Davis will be finishing the story he started at Dark Horse Comics, where he was working on B.P.R.D. from 2003 to 2011. He said:

When they expressed interest in The Marquis, I immediately knew Dark Horse was a perfect fit with the types of books they publish. They have a great horror lineup and I couldn't be happier with having the series completed with them."

The ultimate plan was to make The Marquis a five-volume series. The first volume, Inferno, collects the trade paperbacks Danse Macabre and Intermezzo. Davis plans to release the rest as graphic novels, starting with The Marquis and the Midwife and then two more that finish the Marquis' story, followed by a final prequel volume. A one-shot prequel to Danse Macabre, titled The Marquis and the Coachman, was published in MySpace/Dark Horse Presents #22 (2009).

== Plot ==
The Marquis takes place in Venisalle, a fictional land resembling France during the mid-18th century, complete with stratified society and Church dominance of everyday affairs. The story revolves around Vol de Galle, a former Inquisitor of The Faith who seemingly has the ability to see demons, many of which have infiltrated society disguised in human form. De Galle combats these supposed entities with his sabre and a pair of specially built, anachronistic machine pistols.

== Reception ==
While ostensibly a horror-action comic, The Marquis analyses personal and religious issues through the conflicted character of de Galle, and has been received well by critics and comics professionals including Mike Mignola and Stan Sakai for both its content and Davis's detailed and disturbing artwork.

== Collected editions ==
To date, two trade paperbacks have been released by Oni Press and one volume collecting all prior material published by Dark Horse.

#	Title	Published	Publisher	Collects	Additional Material	Pages	ISBN
―	The Marquis: Danse Macabre	28 September 2001	Oni Press	Danse Macabre #0–5		176	978-1929998159
―	The Marquis: Intermezzo	29 December 2003	Oni Press	Hell's Courtesan #1–2; A Sin of One		112	978-1929998746
1	The Marquis: Inferno	12 August 2009	Dark Horse	Danse Macabre; Intermezzo	Cover Gallery; Sketchbook	336	978-1595823687
2	The Marquis and the Midwife	Cancelled	Dark Horse	Original material			978-1595824998
