= Alone in the Dark 2 (video game) =

1993 video game

- Developers: Infogrames: Arrow Micro-Techs Corp (PC-98, FM Towns) Krisalis (3DO); Brainstorm Software (Mac)
- Publishers: Infogrames: EU: Infogrames; NA: Kokopeli Digital Studios (PS1/Saturn); NA: Interplay Productions (3DO); EU: Infogrames Multimedia (PS1/Saturn); JP: Arrow Micro-Techs Corp (PC-98, FM Towns); JP: Electronic Arts Victor (3DO, Saturn, PS1); WW: THQ Nordic (Steam)
- Director: Franck De Girolami
- Producer: Bruno Bonnell
- Designers: Christophe Anton, Josiane Girard
- Composer: Jean-Luc Escalant
- Series: Alone in the Dark
- Platforms: MS-DOS, PC-98, FM Towns, 3DO, Sega Saturn, PlayStation, Mac OS
- Release: 1993: MS-DOS; EU: 1993 (floppy); EU: 1994 (CD-ROM); NA: September 25, 1994 PC-98; JP: December 3, 1994 FM Towns; JP: December 3, 1994 3DO; NA: November 22, 1995; EU: 1995 Saturn; JP: February 23, 1996; EU: May 1996; NA: August 6, 1996 PlayStation; EU: May 3, 1996; NA: August 22, 1996; JP: November 8, 1996 Mac OS; NA: 1996
- Genre: Survival horror
- Mode: Single-player

Alone in the Dark 2 is a 1993 survival horror video game developed and published by Infogrames. It is the second installment in the Alone in the Dark series. It was ported to the PC-98 and FM Towns in 1994, 3DO in 1995 under the same name, and to the Saturn and PlayStation in 1996 as Alone in the Dark: Jack Is Back in Europe, and renamed as Alone in the Dark: One-Eyed Jack's Revenge in North America.

== Gameplay ==
The original game's horror theme has been significantly de-emphasized in the sequel. While there are some supernatural goings-on (Voodoo black magic), the main villains are gangsters and pirates. While the enemies are revealed to be possessed by evil spirits, and are green and zombie-like in appearance, they are far from the shambling walking corpses of the first game, and walk, talk, and behave much like ordinary people, arming themselves with guns and shooting at the player. The player can pick up weapons on the way with firearms such as the Revolver equipped at the start of the game, Shotguns, Tommy guns, a Derringer pistol, Flintlock pistols and melee weapons such as Swords. The game world is larger than that of the original, encompassing not only a mansion, but also the surrounding gardens as well as a pirate ship hidden in caverns beneath the house; however, unlike the first game, with the exception of the main house, its locations may only be explored in a strictly linear sequence, a pattern that would continue in later sequels.

Although much of the game is spent playing as Carnby, the player will occasionally take control of Grace Saunders. Grace, a child, cannot fight and is instantly captured if the gangsters spot her, so instead she must sneak around and defeat the gangsters by turning common household objects into booby traps.

== Plot ==
It is Christmas of 1924, three months before the events in Alone in the Dark. "Supernatural Private Eye" Edward Carnby and his partner Ted Stryker are investigating the kidnapping of young Grace Saunders. The trail of clues leads to an old mansion named "Hell's Kitchen" - the home of an infamous gangster boss and his gang. Edward decides to pick up the trail when he learns of Ted's disappearance in the mansion, but Edward soon finds out that Ted has been murdered.

Carnby eventually finds out that the mobsters are the corporeal forms of the spirits of pirates that plundered the sea hundreds of years ago, the lot having sold their souls in exchange for eternal life through voodoo magic. Fighting his way into the house and ultimately onto a pirate ship hidden in the cliff on which Jack's house is built, Edward must survive, discover the secret of the pirates' apparent immortality, rescue little Grace, and find out why the pirates are so interested in her.

== Jack in the Dark ==
Jack in the Dark is a small game made during production of Alone in the Dark 2. It was used as a promotional game distributed during Christmas in 1993 (just before Alone in the Dark 2 was released). The game was on a single floppy disk in a golden wrapping featuring a Jack-in-the-box illustration on the top. It is a short adventure featuring the young child Grace Saunders. During Halloween, she enters a small toy store after dark and gets locked in it. There, the toys are alive, and Grace must save Santa Claus from an evil Jack-in-the-box. Jack in the Dark is an adventure game that focuses purely on puzzles and has no combat. Later CD versions of both Alone in the Dark and Alone in the Dark 2 came packaged with Jack in the Dark.

== Release ==
The original MS-DOS version shipped on floppy disk. The CD-ROM release added a full Red Book audio soundtrack, dialogue speech (in English, French, German, Italian, Spanish and Japanese, depending on the country the game was released), and a new playable section of Grace Saunders which connects the mansion and the ship areas.

As with the first installment in the series, outside of Europe the game was distributed in North America by Interplay Entertainment and in Japan by Arrow Micro-Techs Corp, which once again developed and published Japanese-exclusive versions for the PC-98 and FM Towns.

The console releases of Alone in the Dark 2 include a 3DO port (1995), and also versions for the Saturn and PlayStation in 1996 with reworked and fully textured polygonal models. New FMV cutscenes were also added to these ports. All console releases were also published in Japan by Electronic Arts Victor, with the Saturn and PlayStation versions being released as Alone in the Dark: Jack Is Back.

== Reception ==
Reception

Review scores
Publication	Score
AllGame	3.5/5 (PC); 3.5/5 (MAC); 2/5 (SAT); 1.5/5 (PS1)
Edge	9/10 (PC)
Electronic Gaming Monthly	4.25/10 (SAT)
Famitsu	5/10, 4/10, 5/10, 5/10 (PS)
Next Generation	2/5 (PS1); 4/5 (3DO); 3/5 (SAT)
Arcane	8/10 (PS1)
Maximum	3/5 (PS1); 2/5 (3DO, SAT)
Sega Saturn Magazine	54% (SAT)

Award
Publication	Award
PC Gamer UK	#7, Top 50 PC Games of All Time

Computer Gaming World in April 1994 said that the computer version of Alone in the Dark 2 "looks rich enough to meet gamers' expectations for a solid sequel". In May 1994 the magazine said that with improved graphics, it "offers plenty of game play for those who like their adventures with a dash of the macabre". In June 1994 the magazine said that the game was not "for those who are easily frustrated". It concluded that "Despite its weak ending ... Alone 2 is a good, solid challenge. Much more so than its predecessor, it will test players' reflexes as well as their minds".

Edge gave the PC version 9/10, praising the "more responsive" character control, "nerve-tinglingly clear" audio samples and "movie-style production" values, as well as the huge increase in the number of locations from the first game. They warn players that the game is "gruesome" and "bloody frightening", concluding that it's "also great entertainment."

Reviewing the PlayStation version, Maximum called the PC original "one of the most ground-breaking arcade/adventures to date" and hailed its appearance on the PlayStation as "the first true arcade/adventure for the system." They commented approvingly on the H. P. Lovecraft-inspired locations, the way the player is eased into the controls, and the twist of having to play through a segment of the game as Grace. However, they remarked that the game is outdated and outclassed by the upcoming Resident Evil. Next Generation emphasized the last point: "frankly it's yesterday's news, and releasing it to PlayStation in the wake of Resident Evil just makes it redundant."

James V. Trunzo reviewed Alone in the Dark 2 in White Wolf #47 (Sept., 1994), rating it a 4 out of 5 and stated that "In the end, Alone in the Dark 2 should be experienced by all serious gamers."

Steve Bradley reviewed the PlayStation version of Alone in the Dark: Jack Is Back for Arcane magazine, rating it an 8 out of 10 overall. Bradley comments that "The 3D graphics are superb, the use of camera angles dynamic, but the strength of AITD is the sheer suspense generated as you explore a haunted mansion and its environs - it's genuinely frightening. Sure, the control can be a bit iffy (a general rule of thumb in such fare as this) and the graphics are a mite patchy, but it's by far the best roleplaying adventure game for the PlayStation."

Maximum was more harsh with the 3DO version, saying that the game is far too old to be worth converting to home console. They said it looks especially poor due to being (by pure coincidence) released in Europe at the same time as the PlayStation version: "The Sony conversion boasts texture-mapped characters moving at higher speeds and with less loading time, whilst the poor old 3DO struggles with flat shaded polygons, a smaller screen size and a chugging frame rate." A reviewer for Next Generation complained that a combination of poor control and awkward fixed camera angles makes battling enemies more difficult than it should be. He nonetheless gave it a strong recommendation, and summarized it as "a direct port of the PC title, and a huge game with a great cinematic feel and lots of fiendishly clever puzzles."

The Saturn version received generally negative reviews. Electronic Gaming Monthly gave it a 4.25 out of 10, citing difficult aiming, poor graphics, confusing cutscenes, absurd voice acting, and camera angles which change too frequently, making it difficult to hit enemies or get a sense of direction. Rob Bright of Sega Saturn Magazine commented that the game has "a well worked plot mixing the fantasy and myth of pirates with a bootlegging 1920s America to create a sort of Gothic noir", but echoed Electronic Gaming Monthly's criticisms with the aiming, graphics, and camera angles. GamePro's Scary Larry remarked that even though the original Alone in the Dark was the probable inspiration for Resident Evil, the sequel dramatically fails to measure up. He particularly commented that the graphics and audio lack the realism and life that made Resident Evil so scary, and that "The quirky controls don't help the less-than-appealing gameplay or the boring story line." Yasuhiro Hunter of Maximum similarly commented that the game is a feeble attempt at giving the Saturn an equivalent to Resident Evil, with a poor CG intro, frustrating controls, and animations which fail to induce Resident Evil's sense of fear. He said that Alone in the Dark 2 did have a deep plot and was very good at the time of its original release on PC, but had become very outdated in the two years since. Next Generation, while acknowledging that the game was dated next to recent efforts, contended that it "still manages to hold up fairly well on its own." The reviewer criticized the sometimes poorly chosen camera angles but was pleased with the game's graphics and massive size.

In 1994, PC Gamer UK named Alone in the Dark 2 the 7th best computer game of all time, calling it "an incredibly involving and film-like experience".
