= Alone in the Dark: The New Nightmare =

2001 video game

- European box art
- Developer: Darkworks (Note: Ported to Windows and PS2 by Spiral House. Pocket Studios developed the Game Boy Color version.)
- Publisher: Infogrames
- Producer: Kurt Busch
- Designer: Laurent Franchet
- Composers: Thierry Desseaux; Stewart Copeland
- Series: Alone in the Dark
- Platforms: PlayStation; Game Boy Color; Windows; Dreamcast; PlayStation 2
- Release: May 18, 2001: PlayStation, Game Boy Color; EU: May 18, 2001; NA: June 29, 2001 Windows, Dreamcast; EU: June 22, 2001; NA: June 29, 2001 (PC); NA: September 24, 2001 (DC) PlayStation 2; EU: September 28, 2001; FR: October 15, 2001
- Genre: Survival horror
- Mode: Single-player

Alone in the Dark: The New Nightmare (alternatively and internally known as Alone in the Dark 4) is a survival horror video game and the fourth installment and first reboot of the video game series Alone in the Dark, developed by Darkworks and published by Infogrames. The game was released in 2001 on Windows, PlayStation, Dreamcast, and Game Boy Color. A PlayStation 2 version of the game was also released several months after and only in Europe.

== Plot ==
Set on October 31, 2001. Edward Carnby's best friend and partner, Charles Fiske, has been found dead off the coast of Shadow Island, a mysterious island near the coast of Massachusetts. Carnby's investigation quickly leads him to Frederick Johnson, who informs him of Fiske's search for three ancient tablets with the ability to unlock an incredible and dangerous power. Johnson pleads with Carnby to take the place of Fiske and reopen the investigation in order to recover the tablets. Carnby accepts and makes it his mission to find Fiske's killer. Johnson introduces Edward to Aline Cedrac, an intelligent, young university professor. She joins Edward to recover the missing tablets and assist Professor Obed Morton, whom she believes to be her father. While flying over the coast of Shadow Island, Edward and Aline's plane comes under attack by an unknown creature. Edward and Aline both jump out of the plane and parachute to the ground, but are separated immediately. Edward lands in the dense forest just outside a manor, while Aline lands on the roof of it. The game's plot is a separate canon from the main of the series.

== Gameplay ==
The player is given the option of choosing which of the two protagonists they play as. Carnby's side of the plot is based mainly on fighting the monsters by physical means, particularly with his trusty double barreled revolver, while Aline's is more centered on puzzles. The two occasionally meet up, and the main areas of plot intersect.

The player soon comes under attack from Creatures of Darkness that appear out of nowhere and seem to be living shadows. These Creatures of Darkness are eventually revealed to be reptilian, silicon-based life forms from the center of the Earth, an enormous world of dark caverns known as the World of Darkness. Shadow Island apparently contains one of the many portals to this underground world. True to their name, the game's enemies are averse to light (which apparently turns them into ash), and this figures heavily in gameplay. Players can use their flashlight to repel certain creatures, and killing them is accomplished with such light-producing ammunition as magnesium bullets and phosphorus shells.

Light plays a significant role in this game. One of the game's main features is the flashlight that can be used to light up the game's darkened scenes, revealing hidden details and uncovering items. To this end, the developers crafted an unusual graphics engine which allowed the 3D player character's flashlight to properly illuminate and cast shadows on the 2D, pre-rendered backdrops. This was accomplished by rendering the backdrops at various levels of illumination and including information on the distribution of objects in the scene. The graphics engine could then properly use brighter versions of the backdrop where the flashlight was expected to be casting light, and leave shadowed areas dark.

== Development and release ==
For the first time in the series, the game was based on console development and released as a multiplatform title. Darkworks handled the development of the PlayStation and Dreamcast versions, the latter being released one month after the former and featuring major graphic improvements. Spiral House ported the Dreamcast version to Windows. It was released at the same time of the Dreamcast version, but suffers from sound conversion issues which turn the overall soundtrack into noticeably worse quality renditions. Spiral House also ported the Dreamcast version to the PlayStation 2 and released it several months after, with the addition of lip synchronization for the polygon models during cutscenes.

A Game Boy Color version of the game was separately developed by Pocket Studios which was a relatively faithful version of the home console game. Its format necessitated the loss of the full motion video cut scenes from the other versions, Edward is the only player character, and many gameplay areas had to be reduced in size while some were eliminated entirely.

The game was released in North America by Infogrames, except for the PlayStation 2 version, which was only released in Europe. In Japan, the PlayStation and PlayStation 2 versions were planned to be released by Capcom, but these releases were cancelled. The game was eventually released in Japan for Windows in 2002 by CyberFront, featuring English voices and Japanese subtitles unlike the Japanese versions of the previous Alone in the Dark games, which were fully dubbed to Japanese.

A prequel comic, Alone in the Dark: Life Is a Hideous Thing, was published in France by Semic Comics in 2001 and was released in English in September 2002.

The PlayStation version was released in May 2012 as a PSone classic on the PlayStation Network. As of September 1, it is also compatible with the PlayStation Vita, but is not compatible with PSP due to porting issues. As of April 2024, the game was made available for PlayStation 4 and PlayStation 5 as part of the Premium tier for PlayStation Plus.

As of October 2013, the Windows version was released on Steam. The Game Boy Color version was later released on the Nintendo Classics service as one of its debut Game Boy games on February 8, 2023.

== Reception ==
Reception

Aggregate scores
Aggregator	Score			
Aggregator	Dreamcast	GBC	PC	PS
GameRankings	74%	62%	70%	76%
Metacritic	75/100	N/A	66/100	77/100

Review scores
Publication	Score			
Publication	Dreamcast	GBC	PC	PS
Computer Gaming World	N/A	N/A	3/5	N/A
Electronic Gaming Monthly	N/A	N/A	N/A	5.67/10
Eurogamer	N/A	N/A	N/A	8/10
Game Informer	8/10	7.5/10	N/A	8/10
GamePro	4/5	N/A	N/A	4.5/5
GameRevolution	N/A	N/A	N/A	B
GameSpot	6.9/10	N/A	5.6/10	6.4/10
GameSpy	(EU) 8.5/10 (US) 7.5/10	N/A	72%	N/A
GameZone	7/10	N/A	7/10	8.3/10
IGN	7.3/10	4/10	8/10	N/A
Next Generation	3/5	N/A	3/5	N/A
Nintendo Power	N/A	2.5/5	N/A	N/A
Official U.S. PlayStation Magazine	N/A	N/A	N/A	4/5
PC Gamer (US)	N/A	N/A	65%	N/A
The Cincinnati Enquirer	N/A	N/A	3/5	N/A
The Sunday Times	N/A	4/5	N/A	N/A

Alone in the Dark: The New Nightmare was well received. The PlayStation and Dreamcast versions received "generally favorable reviews", while the PC version received "average" reviews, according to the review aggregation website Metacritic. GamesMaster gave the Game Boy Color version 90%, and The Sunday Times gave it the award of Game of the Week. According to Darkworks, The New Nightmare sold almost 1.4 million units by 2005.

AllGame gave the GBC version three stars out of five, saying, "Despite the frightening battle system and confusing play, the game is ultimately redeeming. It is definitely worth seeing; the eerie graphics can really pull a player into its spooky environment. But customers should think carefully before purchasing it, and not jump into things as fast as Edward Carnby did. Those who are patient and dedicated will probably find Alone in the Dark: The New Nightmare very rewarding, while everyone else might consider this game a bit too difficult and trying." The website also gave the PlayStation version three stars out of five, saying, "This game should have been in development longer and more polished (there are numerous graphical glitches and clipping that occurs). A good game, but it could've been great. As with all survival horror games, play this game in the dark, and only at night. It's vital that you do, and it accents the game." Edge gave the same console version seven out of ten. X-Play gave the Dreamcast version three stars out of five and said that it " isn't really bad. However, it also isn't really new. It's just a shambling clone in step with the rest of the survival horror games. Perhaps its creators would have been better off evoking an old nightmare instead." Carla Harker of Next Generation said of the PC version in its October 2001 issue, "Despite its faults, very few PC games provide these kinds of Lovecraftian thrills and chills. The New Nightmare suffices." Jeff Lundrigan of the same magazine later said of the Dreamcast version in its final issue, "If you haven't tried any other version, Dreamcast is definitely the way to go with this one."

Computer Games Magazine nominated The New Nightmare as the best adventure game of 2001, but ultimately gave the award to Myst III: Exile.

== Film ==
In 2005, a film adaptation was released called Alone in the Dark loosely based on the fourth installment. It was directed by Uwe Boll and was a box office flop costing $20,000,000, which was not recovered, and poorly received by critics, although it made a profit on the DVD market. Guinness World Records named the film the "Lowest-Grossing Game Based Movie" in the Guinness World Records: Gamer's Edition 2008 edition. An Unrated Director's Cut was released in Germany, France and Australia and was #1 on the German DVD market for three weeks.
