= Alone in the Dark 3 =

1995 video game

- MS-DOS version box art
- Developers: Infogrames Multimedia: AMT Savan Corps (PC-98); Brainstorm Software (Mac)
- Publishers: Infogrames Multimedia: EU: Infogrames Multimedia; NA: I•Motion; JP: AMT Savan Corps (PC-98); JP: Electronic Arts Victor (Windows, Mac)
- Director: Christiane Sgorlon
- Producer: Bruno Bonnell
- Writers: Hubert Chardot; Christian Nabais
- Composer: Frédéric Mentzen
- Series: Alone in the Dark
- Platforms: MS-DOS, PC-98, Windows, Mac OS
- Release: February 1995: MS-DOS; EU: February 1995; NA: March 16, 1995 Windows; EU: 1995; JP: June 21, 1995 Mac; NA/EU: 1996; JP: June 21, 1996 PC-98; JP: December 8, 1996
- Genre: Survival horror
- Mode: Single player

Alone in the Dark 3 is a 1995 survival horror video game developed and published by Infogrames Multimedia. It is the third installment of the Alone in the Dark video game series. The video game was released for MS-DOS in 1995. It was ported to the PC-98 later that year. Versions for Windows and Mac OS were also released in 1996.

== Plot ==
It is July 1925 and after Edward Carnby's success in his previous two investigations, a journalist has nicknamed him the 'Supernatural Private Eye'. This time, he is called to investigate the disappearance of a film crew at a two-bit ghost town known by the name of Slaughter Gulch located in the Mojave Desert in California. Among the disappeared crew is Emily Hartwood, Jeremy Hartwood's niece from the original. Edward soon discovers that a curse has gripped the town, and an evil cowboy from the Badlands named Jed Stone is the villain who is responsible for the crew's disappearance. Lurking around town are many trigger-happy sharpshooters, deranged prospectors, and bloodthirsty lost souls whom Edward must ward off with both his strength and his wit.

== Gameplay ==
The main theme of this game is the Wild West, as Carnby is pitted against a town filled with "zombie cowboy outlaws" who attack him with revolvers and lever-action rifles. More traditionally mindless, shambling zombies begin to appear about midway through the game. Towards the end of the game, the concept of radioactive mutation plays a significant role in the story, and the player ends up fighting monstrous creatures created from the radiation.

== Release ==
This was the first game in the series not to be released on floppy disks. Rather, it was released as a CD-ROM game since the initial release, with full Red Book audio soundtrack and dialogue speech (in English, French, German, Spanish, Italian, Japanese and Portuguese, depending on the country the game was released, and with the Mac version specifically featuring a different English dub) like the CD-ROM re-releases of the previous two games. It was also the first game in the series to be exclusively released for several computer formats and therefore did not receive any official console release unlike the previous two games.

Outside of Europe, the game was distributed in North America by Interplay Entertainment. In Japan, a PC-98 version of the game was developed and released in 1995 by AMT Savan Corps, a merge of the company previously known as Arrow Micro-Techs Corp which published the previous games for Japanese computers. There was no FM-Towns version developed this time. In 1996, the Windows and Mac OS versions were also released in Japan by Electronic Arts Victor as Alone in the Dark 3: Ghosts in Town.

A 3DO Interactive Multiplayer version of Alone in the Dark 3 was announced but never released.

The official guide to the game (Alone in the Dark 3: The Official Strategy Guide, Prima Publishing, 1995; re-released by the author, 2019) was written by Steve Schwartz in cooperation with Infogrames.

== Reception ==
Reception

Review scores
| Publication | Score |
|---|---|
| AllGame | 4/5 (MAC); 4/5 (PC) |
| PC Gamer | 88% |

== See also ==
- Undead Nightmare, another horror Western video game
