= Alone in the Dark (2008 video game) =

2008 video game

- Developers: Eden Games (PC, Xbox 360, PlayStation 3); Hydravision Entertainment (Wii and PlayStation 2)
- Publisher: Atari, Inc.
- Director: David Nadal
- Producer: Nour Polloni
- Designer: Hervé Sliwa
- Artists: Jean-Christophe Blanc; Gilles Benois
- Writers: Hervé Sliwa; Sébastien Renard; Mathieu Kendrick
- Composer: Olivier Deriviere
- Series: Alone in the Dark
- Engine: Twilight 2 (PC, PS3, X360); RenderWare (PS2, Wii)
- Platforms: PlayStation 2, PlayStation 3, Windows, Xbox 360, Wii
- Release: Windows, PlayStation 2, Wii, Xbox 360: EU: June 20, 2008; NA: June 23, 2008; AU: June 26, 2008; PlayStation 3: EU: November 14, 2008; NA: November 18, 2008; AU: November 20, 2008
- Genre: Survival horror
- Mode: Single-player

Alone in the Dark is a survival horror video game published by Atari, Inc. and is the fifth installment of the series under the same name. The game was released for Microsoft Windows, PlayStation 2, Xbox 360 and Wii in Europe, North America, and Australia in June 2008. The PlayStation 3 version, titled Alone in the Dark: Inferno, was released in November 2008 and includes several enhancements from the other versions. The Windows, Xbox 360 and PlayStation 3 versions were released by Electronic Arts in Japan on December 25, 2008.

The Windows, Xbox 360 and PlayStation 3 versions were developed by Eden Games while the PS2 and Wii versions were simultaneously developed by Hydravision Entertainment. The PS2 and Wii version of Alone in the Dark is a completely different game from the Windows, Xbox 360 and PlayStation 3 version. Though both have a similar plot, it has largely different levels, removing all the free-roaming from the other versions. Despite receiving mixed reviews, Alone in the Dark was a financial success.

== Gameplay ==
The gameplay in Alone in the Dark differs greatly from other games in the series. It is set out through DVD-style "episodes", where the player can choose to start the game from the beginning or choose to skip to a section if they get stuck. If they choose to do so, the past events are recollected in a "Previously on Alone in the Dark..." cutscene at the start of the episode.

Alone in the Dark has an interchangeable first and third person camera, and puzzle solving style gameplay. The environment plays a big part of the core gameplay, as the player can pick up any object (such as pipes, wood, etc.) and use it as a melee weapon. It can also be used to break through doors, and knock objects over. Fire is generated in real-time, as objects can be set alight by holding it over the fire, and it can be extinguished. If the fire isn't extinguished fast enough, the flames will continue to regenerate. The player can pick up objects, and combine to make different styles of weapons, however, only some objects can be combined with others. Any object which is shot at or thrown will be destroyed instantly.

If the player takes damage, open wounds appear on Edward's outfit. The player must use a medical spray or, if the wounds are too deep, use bandages to heal themselves. If Edward takes too much damage, the screen will flash red, and a heartbeat sound will be heard indicating that he is bleeding out.

== Plot ==
The game begins with an amnesiac Edward Carnby, a paranormal investigator recovering from an exorcism performed on him by a group of occultists led by Crowley. A guard is instructed to take him to the roof for execution, only to be dragged away and slaughtered by an unseen force. He wanders the collapsing building in search of an exit; witnessing several people being killed in a similar fashion as the guard, as well as a young woman becoming possessed by a demon which claims to know of his past. After battling the entity, he meets art dealer Sarah Flores. They make their way to the basement parking garage where they meet Theophile Paddington, the occultist who performed Edward's exorcism and an old apprentice and friend of Carnby's. Theo explains the nature of the Philosopher's Stone and Crowley's desire to unleash its evil power.

Hijacking a car, they drive into New York City, finding it in the same destroyed state as the building; supernatural fissures erupting from the earth. They crash in Central Park and Theo gives Edward the Stone, telling him to find him in a room of a museum before killing himself. On the way to the museum, Edward begins to bleed out from his injuries. Making his way through the destruction, Edward learns his surname from Crowley. Later, his past medical records from an attending medic reveals that he is over a hundred years old, having disappeared in 1938. Finding Room 943 of the Metropolitan Museum of Art, Theo's ghost explains more of the Stone's history. Forged by Lucifer after his fall from Heaven, the Stone tempted men with promises of mass wealth and immortality; in actuality, it merely made them vessels for the Devil's soul.

Sarah stays behind in the museum to research Paddington's notes, emailing Edward various texts as well as receiving some from Crowley, both of which reveal more of his past and the Stone. Delving deep beneath Belvedere Castle, he solves various puzzles trailing the Path of Light. Reaching a hidden chamber in the underground temple, Edward meets Hermes Treismajice, one of the alchemists who built Central Park and the holder of the other half of the Stone - rendering him effectively immortal as he waited for the Carrier of the Stone (Edward) to release him. While driving Hermes back to the museum, Sarah is kidnapped by Crowley and held hostage. In a final confrontation, Edward finally kills the mad occultist by quickly shooting him in the head while he was struggling with Flores. Treismajice then leads them to the innermost chamber.

Inside the chamber, they find a large portal between the living world and the afterlife; a gateway for Lucifer to return to a body. Needing both halves of the Stone to unlock it, Edward and Hermes reunite it on the pedestal only for the Light Bringer to begin repossessing Carnby. Sarah - unwilling to let Edward sacrifice himself - takes the Stone from him, allowing Lucifer to begin possessing her instead. The player is given a choice: to kill her and take the Light Bringer into his own body, or to let her live and allow the Devil to use her as his vessel. If he chooses the former, he becomes fully possessed by Lucifer and declares his intention to rule over humanity. If he chooses the latter, Sarah becomes possessed and the Devil mocks Edward for being so alone; to which he replies, "I'm used to it", before walking away in defeat.

== Development ==
A tech demo was released on February 16, 2008, showing the inventory system and how items and environmental objects can be manipulated, as well as how items may be used together. For example, double-sided adhesive tape can be used to attach a glow stick to a wall, creating a source of light. Another example is the player using a knife to puncture a blood pack, then throwing the blood pack creating a blood trail to lure enemies from one spot to another. A second tech demo was released on February 26, showing the realistic use of fire with various objects in the game.

It also shows how objects are affected when shot. The player is seen shooting a table and subsequently one of the tables legs breaks off, and shatters. The player then picks this up and lights it in a fire for a spontaneous torch. A third tech demo was released on April 18, displaying the attributes and gameplay mechanics of fire in the game. A fourth tech demo was released on June 3, highlighting the enemies and their characteristics including what they look like and how to kill them. The inventory is limited to what it's possible to fit in the jacket. Everything in the environment can be used as a weapon. The game's working title was Alone in the Dark: Near Death Investigation.

The PlayStation 3 and Xbox 360 version uses the Twilight 2 engine.

=== Music ===
The music in Alone in the Dark is scored by Olivier Deriviere. It includes the female choir The Mystery of Bulgarian Voices. Derivière did not use a live orchestra; instead, he used virtual instruments and samplers to create a realistic orchestral sound. The official soundtrack album by Derivière and Voices is available for purchase digitally and in audio CD format.

=== Alone in the Dark: Inferno ===
Alone in the Dark: Inferno is the PlayStation 3 version of the game. It addresses a number of gameplay issues found in the Xbox 360 version, such as the additions of full 360° camera control, a more zoomed-out third-person camera view, a more user-friendly inventory system, and tighter driving mechanics. It also includes an exclusive new gameplay sequence found in Episode 6.

=== Limited editions ===
A limited edition of the game was released for the European market. In the UK, the Limited Edition is only available through Game stores.

Along with a copy of the game, the Limited Edition contains:

- A 15 cm Edward Carnby Figurine
- An art book
- A bonus 'Making Of Alone in the Dark' DVD
- A CD audio soundtrack

The U.S. market had a PS2 limited release with just the bonus CD audio soundtrack.

== Reception ==
Reception

Aggregate score
Aggregator	Score				
Aggregator	PC	PS2	PS3	Wii	Xbox 360
Metacritic	55/100	47/100	69/100	39/100	58/100

Review scores
Publication	Score				
Publication	PC	PS2	PS3	Wii	Xbox 360
Destructoid	N/A	N/A	N/A	N/A	3.5/10
Edge	N/A	N/A	N/A	N/A	7/10
Eurogamer	N/A	N/A	7/10	3/10	7/10
Game Informer	6.5/10	N/A	7.25/10	N/A	6.5/10
GamePro	N/A	N/A	N/A	N/A	2.5/5
GameSpot	N/A	N/A	7.5/10	N/A	6.5/10
GameSpy	N/A	N/A	N/A	N/A	2/5
GameTrailers	N/A	N/A	N/A	N/A	7.3/10
GameZone	N/A	N/A	5/10	N/A	4.5/10
IGN	3.5/10	3/10	6.8/10	3.1/10	(UK) 7/10 (AU) 5.9/10 (US) 3.5/10
Nintendo Power	N/A	N/A	N/A	4/10	N/A
Official Xbox Magazine (US)	N/A	N/A	N/A	N/A	5.5/10
PC Gamer (US)	28%	N/A	N/A	N/A	N/A
PlayStation: The Official Magazine	N/A	N/A	3.5/5	N/A	N/A
The A.V. Club	N/A	N/A	N/A	N/A	D+
Variety	N/A	N/A	N/A	N/A	(unfavorable)

The PlayStation 3, Xbox 360 and PC versions of Alone in the Dark received "mixed or average reviews", while the PlayStation 2 and Wii versions received "generally unfavorable reviews", according to the review aggregation website Metacritic. In Japan, Famitsu gave it a score of one seven, one six, one seven and one six for the PS3 version (26/40); and two sixes, one seven, and one five for the Xbox 360 version (24/40).

GameSpot said of the Xbox 360 version: "If you can endure some vexing technical flaws, Alone in the Dark can be a clever, satisfying adventure." GameTrailers said: "The game needed more gestation to really iron out the interface issues, but it remains an adventure worth pursuing...".

The PlayStation 3 version, Alone in the Dark: Inferno, received far more favorable reviews due to the improved movement and driving controls, as well as the extra scenes.

=== Backlash from Atari ===
After several European websites had given the game average or low ratings, publisher Atari threatened the responsible websites with lawsuits, claiming the reviews could not have been based on the final version since it was not available by the time they were published; Atari themselves had not delivered review versions to them. The publisher suspected the reviewers to have used illegally downloaded versions of the title. However, review website Gamer.nl claimed that it was, in fact, sent a legitimate copy of the game prior to its release by Atari executives and, after the review was published: "They explicitly told [Gamer.nl] that they only let high scoring reviews break the post-release embargo date." Gamer.nl still has the offending review posted on the website, despite Atari's wishes. In addition, Atari claimed that reviews were not done as demanded by the official product-review standards at all and should be deleted immediately.

Most other websites defended their reviews and refused to delete their articles. Atari did not follow through with lawsuits. In the meantime, other editors of various other gaming magazines stated that poor reviews were possibly published to garner attention and clicks on their websites, due to the predictability of Atari's reaction.

=== Sales ===
As of July 31, 2008, the game sold 1.2 million copies worldwide.
