= Jean Giraud =

French comics author (1938–2012)

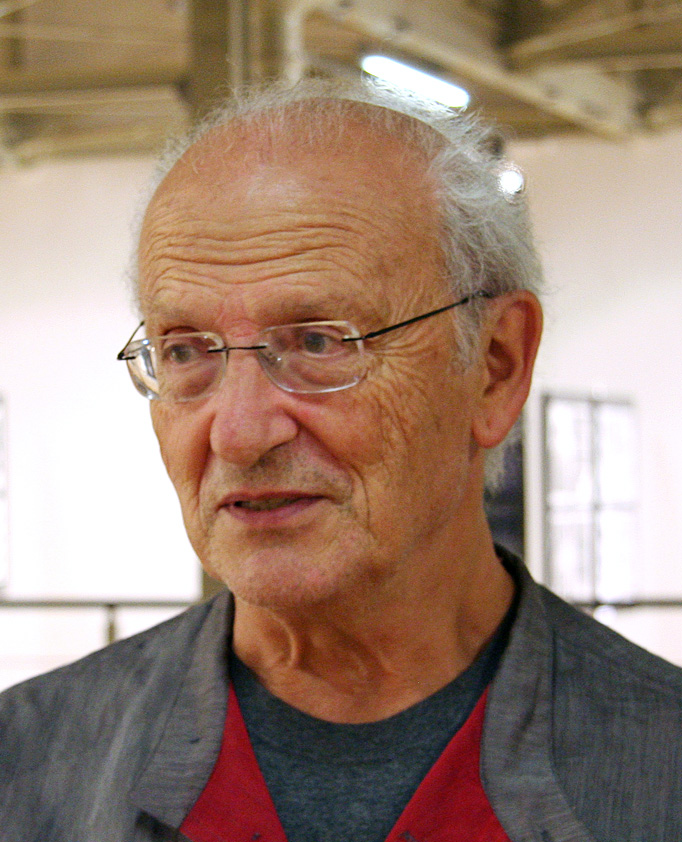
- Giraud in 2008
- Born: Jean Henri Gaston Giraud; 8 May 1938 Nogent-sur-Marne, France
- Died: 10 March 2012 (aged 73) Montrouge, France
- Areas: Writer, Artist
- Pseudonyms: Gir, Moebius, Jean Gir
- Notable works: Blueberry, 1963–2007; Arzach, 1975; The Long Tomorrow, 1976; Airtight Garage, 1976–79; The Incal, 1980-88; The World of Edena, 1983-2001; Silver Surfer: Parable, 1988-89
- Collaborators: Alejandro Jodorowsky, Jean-Michel Charlier
- Awards: full list
- Spouses: Claudine Conin (m. 1967–1994) Isabelle Champeval (m. 1995–2012)
- Children: Hélène Giraud (1970); Julien Giraud (1972); Raphaël Giraud (1989); Nausicaa Giraud (1995)

Jean Henri Gaston Giraud (French: [ʒiʁo]; 8 May 1938 – 10 March 2012) was a French artist, cartoonist, and writer who worked in the Franco-Belgian bandes dessinées (BD) tradition. Giraud garnered worldwide acclaim predominantly under the pseudonym Mœbius (/ˈmoʊbiəs/; French: [møbjys]) for his fantasy/science-fiction work, and to a slightly lesser extent as Gir (French: [ʒiʁ]), which he used for his Western-themed work. Esteemed by Federico Fellini, Stan Lee, and Hayao Miyazaki, among others, he has been described as the most influential bande dessinée artist after Hergé.

His most famous body of work as Gir concerns the Blueberry series, created with writer Jean-Michel Charlier, featuring one of the first antiheroes in Western comics. As Mœbius, he achieved worldwide renown with science-fiction and fantasy comics drawn in a highly imaginative, surreal, almost abstract style. These works include Arzach and the Airtight Garage. He also collaborated with avant garde filmmaker Alejandro Jodorowsky for an unproduced adaptation of Dune and the comic-book series The Incal.

Mœbius also contributed storyboards and concept designs to several science-fiction and fantasy films, such as Alien, Tron, The Fifth Element, and The Abyss.

== Early life ==
Jean Giraud was born in Nogent-sur-Marne, Val-de-Marne, in the suburbs of Paris, on 8 May 1938, the only child to Raymond Giraud, an insurance agent, and Pauline Vinchon, a clerk. When he was five years old, his parents divorced and he was raised by mainly his grandparents in the neighboring municipality of Fontenay-sous-Bois (much later, when he was an acclaimed artist, Giraud returned to live in the municipality in the mid-1970s). Giraud later explained that his parents' divorce lay at the heart of his choice of separate pen names. A sickly and introverted child, Giraud found solace after World War II in a small theater, located on a corner in the street where his mother lived, which provided an escape from the dreary atmosphere in postwar reconstruction-era France. Playing an abundance of American B-movie Westerns, Giraud, frequenting the theater there as often as he was able to, developed a passion for the genre.

Around ages 9–10, Giraud started to draw Western comics while enrolled in the Saint-Nicolas boarding school in Issy-les-Moulineaux. It was here where he became acquainted with the Belgian comic magazines Spirou and Tintin. In 1954, at age 16, he enrolled in the École Supérieure des Arts Appliqués Duperré, a college of art and design (which he left after two years without graduating, disenchanted as he was with the courses, prevalent atmosphere, and academic discipline, though he came to somewhat regret the decision in later life). At college, he befriended future comic artists Jean-Claude Mézières and Pat Mallet. With Mézières in particular, in no small part due to their shared passion for science fiction and Westerns, Giraud developed a lifelong friendship, calling him "life's continuing adventure" in later life.

== Career ==
=== Western comics ===
==== Fleurus (1956–1958) ====
At 17, Giraud drew Frank et Jeremie, a series of humorous Morris-inspired Western comic shorts for the magazine Far West (published from February to June 1956), his first freelance commercial sales. Magazine editor Marijac thought Giraud was gifted with a knack for humorous comics, but none whatsoever for realistically drawn comics, and advised him to continue in the vein of "Frank et Jeremie".

In the summer of 1956, he went to Mexico, where he lived with his mother - who had married a Mexican - for eight months. Giraud's impression of the Mexican desert, in particular its endless blue skies and flat plains, left a strong impression on him, which he later called "quelque chose qui m'a littéralement craqué l'âme" ("something which literally cracked open my soul"). After his return to France, he worked as a full-time tenured artist for Catholic publisher Fleurus presse, to whom he was introduced by Mézières, who had shortly before found employment at the publisher.

Giraud continued to produce humorous comics, but also realistically drawn Western comics and French historicals for Fripounet et Marisette, Cœurs Vaillants, and Âmes vaillantes. Among his Westerns from this period are Le roi des bisons ("King of the Buffalo")) and Un géant chez lez Hurons("A Giant among the Hurons"). Several of his Western comics featured the protagonist Art Howell, and are considered Giraud's first realistic Western series. For Fleurus, Giraud illustrated his first three books. During this period, his style was heavily influenced by his future mentor, Belgian leading comic artist Joseph "Jijé" Gillain, who at that time was a major source of inspiration for the generation of young cartoonists interested in realistically drawn comics. How major Jijé's influence was on these young artists was amply demonstrated by the Fleurus publications, as their work strongly resembled each other. For example, two of the books Giraud illustrated for Fleurus, were co-illustrated with Guy Mouminoux, another name of some future renown in the Franco-Belgian comic world, and Giraud's work can only be identified because he signed his work, whereas Mouminoux did not.

In 1958–1960, he was drafted for military service, where he served in the French Forces in Germany, and French Algeria during the Algerian War (in which he did not take part). He managed to receive a transfer out of frontline duty due to his graphics background, obtaining an illustrator position on the army magazine 5/5 Forces Françaises. Algeria was Giraud's second acquaintance with more exotic cultures, which inspired many of his future science fiction comics.

==== Jijé apprenticeship (1960–1961) ====
Shortly before he entered military service, Giraud had visited Jijé at his home for the first time with Mézières and Mallet, followed by a few visits on his own. When Giraud left military servies, he was uninterested in continuing work at Fleurus, and became an apprentice of Jijé on his invitation. Jijé was then known for his tendency to act as a mentor for young artists, going as far as welcoming them into his family home in Champrosay.

For Jijé, Giraud created several other shorts and illustrations for the short-lived magazine Bonux-Boy (1960/61), his first comic work after military service, and his penultimate one before embarking on Blueberry. Jijé used Giraud as an inker on his Western series Jerry Spring, which Giraud had used as a model for his "Art Howell" character. Actually, Jijé had intended his promising pupil for the entirety of the story art, but the still-inexperienced Giraud, who was used to working under the relaxed conditions at Fleurus, found himself overwhelmed by the strict time schedules that production for a periodical (Spirou in this case) demanded. Conceding that he had been a bit too cocky and ambitious, Giraud stated, "I started the story all by myself, but after a week, I had only finished half a plate, and aside from being soaked with my sweat, it was a complete disaster. So Joseph went on to do the penciling, whereas I did the inks." Even though Giraud lost touch with his mentor, he never forgot what "his master" had provided him with, both "aesthetically and professionally", the fatherless Giraud gratefully stating in later life, "It was as if he had asked me «Do you want me to be your father?», and if by a miracle, I was provided with one, a[n] [comic] artist no less!".

==== Hachette (1961–1962) ====
After his stint at Jijé's, Giraud was again approached by friend Mézières to see if he was interested to work alongside him as an illustrator on Hachette's ambitious multivolume L'histoire des civilisations reference work. Spurred on by Jijé, who considered the opportunity a wonderful one for his pupil, Giraud accepted. He considered the assignment a daunting one, having to create in oil paints historical objects and imagery. It was, besides being the best-paying job he had ever had, a seminal appointment. At Hachette, Giraud discovered that he had a knack for creating art in gouaches, something that served him well later when creating Blueberry magazine/album cover art, as well as for his 1968 side project "Buffalo Bill: le roi des éclaireurs" history book written by George Fronval, for whom Giraud provided two-thirds of the illustrations in gouache, including the cover. In the Pilote era, Giraud provided art in gouache for two Western-themed LP covers, as well as the covers for the first seven volumes of the French-language edition of the Morgan Kane Western novel series, written by Louis Masterson. Much of his Western-themed gouache artwork of this era, including that of Blueberry, has been collected in the 1983 artbook Le tireur solitaire.

==== Pilote (1963–1974) ====
In October 1963, Giraud and writer Jean-Michel Charlier started the comic strip Fort Navajo. for the Charlier-co-founded Pilote magazine, in issue 210. While the Fort Navajo series had originally been intended as an ensemble narrative, it quickly focused on having Blueberry, whose facial features were based on actor Jean-Paul Belmondo, as its central figure. At this time the similarity between the styles of Giraud and Jijé (who in effect had been Charlier's first choice for the series, but who was reverted to Giraud by Jijé) was so close that, when "Fort Navajo" started its run, Pilote received angry letters accusing Giraud of plagiarism. Jijé encouraged his former pupil to stay the course, propping up his self-confidence. Jijé had to pencil several pages for the series : first during the production of the second story, "Thunder in the West" (1964), on plates 28–36 and a year later, during the production of "Mission to Mexico (The Lost Rider)" on plates 17–38, when Giraud left to travel the United States and Mexico. While the art style of both artists had been nearly indistinguishable from each other in "Thunder in the West", after Giraud resumed work on plate 39 of "Mission to Mexico", a clearly noticeable style change was observable, indicating that Giraud was now well on his way to develop his own signature style, eventually surpassing that of his former teacher Jijé, who, impressed by his former pupil's achievements, has later coined him the "Rimbaud de la BD".

Blueberry, created by Giraud and writer Jean-Michel Charlier. Within the series, he turned from the classic Western comic to a grittier realism

The early Blueberry comics used standard Western themes and imagery, specifically those of John Ford and Howard Hawk. Gradually Giraud developed a darker and grittier style inspired by the 1970 Westerns Soldier Blue and Little Big Man (for the "Iron Horse" story-arc), and the Spaghetti Westerns of Sergio Leone and the dark realism of Sam Peckinpah (in particular (for the "Lost Goldmine" story-arc and beyond). With the fifth album, "The Trail of the Navajos", Giraud established his own style. During the May 1968 social upheaval in France, Giraud and other key comics artists staged a protest, demanding and ultimately receiving more creative freedom from editor-in-chief René Goscinny (Note: "On his part in the uprising at Pilote Giraud said in 1974, 'It was shit, absolute shit ... ! I got ulcers at the publisher, they behaved horribly. They are all – and I weigh my words carefully – pigs and assholes. The way they treated their artists – who provided them with their bread and butter in the first place – was despicable, inexcusable. There was no social insurance, no retirement plans, etc. I know people who wound up in unbearable circumstances, who were fired and ended up in dire straits ... It was not a particularly bright thing to do on the publisher's part, they should have nurtured their stable of artists instead, if only for strategic reasons. In May '68 we, together with the union, convened a meeting to which we invited the responsible editors. But it was only Goscinny who showed up. There he stood, entirely alone, before an agitated mob who went after him, instead of conducting a dialog, discussing the problems. I was one of them, and ripped into him mercilessly. He was previously led to believe in private, that we all could come to some sort of arrangement together, and now he had to take all this abuse. There were even some guys who called him names and threatened him. Goscinny really found himself in an awful situation. He took it very hard, and I can not blame him, it was simply unjustified. I believe that he has never been able to put it behind him ... We demanded answers, proposals, improvements from him. But you cannot expect that from a man like Goscinny: Every attack hurt him deeply, had him choking on it, had him freeze ... Ever since, Goscinny distrusted his co-workers, especially me, because I was the only representative of the Pilote team, whose interests I represented.'") – the strip became more explicitly adult, and also adopted a thematically wider range. The first Blueberry album penciled by Giraud after he had begun publishing science fiction as Mœbius, "Nez Cassé" ("Broken Nose"), was more experimental than his previous Western work. While the editorial revolt had effectively become the starting point of the emancipation of the French comic world, Giraud admitted that it also had caused a severe breach in his hitherto warm relationship with the conservative Goscinny, which never fully mended.

Giraud left Dargaud in 1974, partly because he was tired of the publication pressure he was under in order to produce the series, partly because of an emerging royalties conflict, but mostly because he wanted to explore and develop his "Mœbius" alter ego. Jodorowsky, who was impressed by the graphic qualities of Blueberry, invited Giraud to start production design on his Dune movie project, which constituted the first Jodorowsky/Mœbius collaboration. Giraud was so eager to start the project, that he accelerated work on the Blueberry serial "Angel Face", cutting off weeks from its originally intended completion.

Jodorowsky introduced Giraud to the writings of Carlos Castaneda, who had written a series of books that describe his training in shamanism, particularly with a group whose lineage descended from the Toltecs. The books, narrated in the first person, related his experiences under the tutelage of a Yaqui "Man of Knowledge" named Don Juan Matus. Castaneda's writings made a deep impression on Giraud, already open to Native-Mexican folk culture due to his previous extended trips to the country (he had visited the country a third time in 1972), and it influenced his art as "Mœbius". (Note: "On the impression Castaneda had left on him Giraud stated in 1975, "Alejandro gave me these books, and the reading was a great shock, a monumental shock. I was captivated, I discovered another life, a new way of thinking. It of course already landed in fertile ground, but because of Jodorowsky, all the more so. It was his way, by giving me these books, to influence me. One influences each other in daily work, one disagrees with each other. But with these books, he hit the nail on the head, these texts moved me to the core! And I let myself be affected. I find myself in a curious phase ... I believe I'm on a turning point in my life. I experienced something similar when I read "Steppenwolf" by Hermann Hesse: I could then accept much of what I suppressed until then, or did not even acknowledge, even if they were fundamental truths in reality. In Castaneda's books, reality is constantly questioned – and that's shocking, earth-shattering. The same experience is possibly experienced when one reads the early Christian texts, or some other mystic text: Enlightenment can be found through anything, through Zen, Nazism even. I found it through Castaneda.) Unbeknownst to writer Charlier, he managed to sneak in some Castaneda elements in the Blueberry story "Nez Cassé". Castaneda's influence reasserted itself in full in Giraud's later life, having worked in elements more openly after Charlier's death in his 1999 Blueberry outing "Geronimo l'Apache".

Charlier was conservative in nature and wary of science fiction in general, and never understood what his younger colleague tried to achieve as "Mœbius". Despite this, Charlier understood Giraud's need for a "mental shower" from time to time, and he was appreciative of the graphic innovations Giraud brought into the Blueberry series, making him "one of the all-time greatest artists in the comic medium," as Charlier said in 1982. Artist Michel Rouge, who was brought on by Giraud in 1980 as an inker on "La longue marche" ("The Long March") noted that Charlier was not pleased with Giraud taking on an assistant, afraid that it might have been a prelude to his leaving the series in order to pursue his "experimentations" as Mœbius further. While Charlier was willing to overlook Giraud's "philandering", he was otherwise of the firm conviction that artists, especially his own, should totally and wholeheartedly devote themselves to their craft, as Charlier had always considered the medium.. According to Giraud, Charlier's purported stance negatively influenced his son (who became the 50% Blueberry co-owner after the death of his father), causing their relationship to rapidly deteriorate into open animosity, Philippe Charlier for example did not hesitate to veto the Blueberry 1900-project that Giraud had written for François Boucq.

==== Post-Pilote (1979–2007) ====
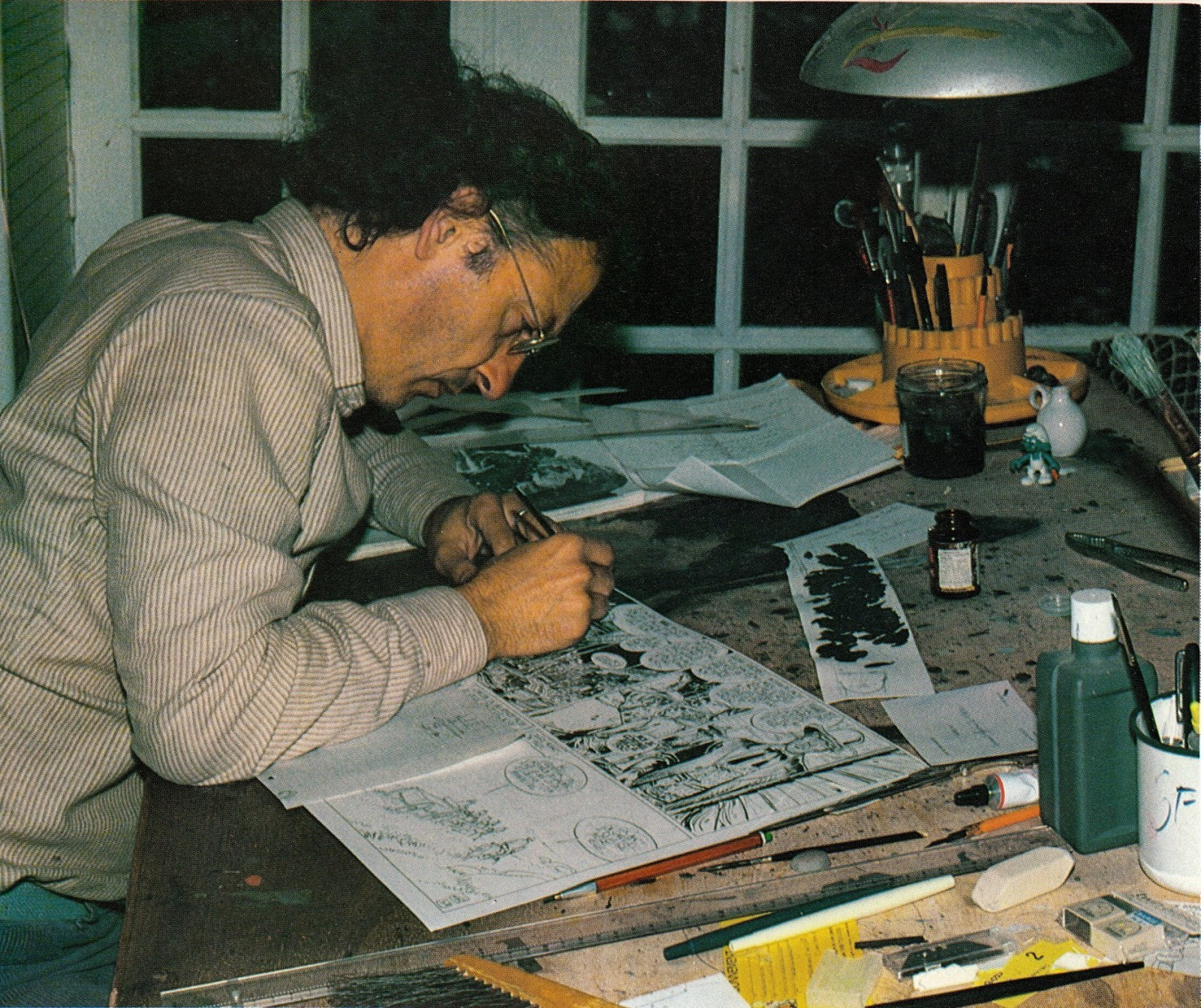
Giraud working on plate 31b of Blueberry volume 20; "La tribu fantôme", ca. 1981

In 1979, the long-running disagreement Charlier and Giraud had with their publishing house Dargaud over the residuals from Blueberry came to a head. They began the Western comic Jim Cutlass as a means to put pressure on Dargaud. It did not work, and Charlier and Giraud turned their back on the parent publisher, in the process taking all of Charlier's other co-creations with them. It would be nearly fifteen years before the Blueberry series (and the others) returned to Dargaud after Charlier died. (For further particulars, including the royalties conflict, see: Blueberry publication history.) When Charlier died in 1989, Giraud took over the scripting of the main series, the last outing of which, "Apaches", released in 2007, became the last title Giraud created for the parent publisher. Blueberry has been translated into 19 languages, the first English book translations being published in 1977/78 by UK publisher Egmont/Methuen, though its publication was cut short after only four volumes. The original Blueberry series has spun off a prequel series called Young Blueberry in the Pilote-era (1968–1970), but the artwork was in 1984, when that series was resurrected, left to Colin Wilson and later Michel Blanc-Dumont after the first three original volumes in that series, as well as the Giraud-written, but William Vance-penciled, 1991–2000 intermezzo series called Marshal Blueberry. All these series, except Jim Cutlass, had returned to the parent publisher Dargaud in late 1993, though Giraud himself – having already left the employ of the publisher in 1974 – had not, instead plying his trade as a free-lancer.

Blueberry has always remained Giraud's most successful work in France and mainland Europe, despite the artist expressing a love/hate relationship with his co-creation in later life, which was exemplified by his regular extended leaves of absence. Giraud has admitted as early as 1979 that Blueberry has remained his primary source of income, allowing him to indulge in his artistic endeavors as Mœbius: "If an album of Moebius is released, about 10,000 people are interested. A Blueberry album sells at least 100,000 copies [in France],". In 2005, Giraud said, "Blueberry is in some ways the 'sponsor' of Moebius, for years now."

=== Science fiction and fantasy comics ===
The "Mœbius" pseudonym, which Giraud came to use for his science fiction and fantasy work, was born in 1963, after working on the Hachette project, as he did not like "to work on paintings alone all day", and "like an alcoholic needing his alcohol" had to create comics. In a satire magazine called Hara-Kiri, Giraud used the name for 21 strips in 1963–64 (much of which collected in Epic's "Mœbius 1/2"). Though Giraud enjoyed the artistic freedom and atmosphere at the magazine greatly, he eventually gave up his work there as Blueberry, on which he had embarked in the meantime, demanded too much of his energy, aside from being a better paid job. Moreover, he found himself confronted with the artist's version of a writer's block as far as Mœbius comics were concerned. "For eight months I tried, but I could not do it, so I quit", stated Giraud additionally. Magazine editor-in-chief Cavanna was loath to let Giraud go, not understanding why Giraud would want to waste his talents on a "kiddy comic". Subsequently, the pseudonym went unused for a decade, that is for comics at least, as Giraud continued its use for side-projects as illustrator. In the late 1960s-early 1970s, Giraud provided interior front, and back flyleaf illustrations as Mœbius for several outings in the science fiction book club series Club du livre d'anticipation, a limited edition hardcover series, collecting work from seminal science fiction writers, from French publisher Éditions OPTA, continuing to do so throughout the 1970s with several additional covers for the publisher's Fiction (the magazine that introduced Giraud to science fiction at age 16) and Galaxie-bis science fiction magazine and pocket book series. Additionally, this period in time also saw four vinyl record music productions endowed with Mœbius sleeve art. Much of this illustration art has been reproduced in Giraud's first art book as Mœbius, aptly entitled "Mœbius", released in 1980. Giraud notwithstanding did a couple of Hara-Kiriesque satirical comic shorts for Pilote in the early 1970s, but under the pseudonym "Gir", most of which reprinted in the comic book Gir œuvres: "Tome 1, Le lac des émeraudes".

==== L'Écho des savanes (1974) ====
In 1974 he truly revived the Mœbius pseudonym for comics, and the very first, 12-page, story he created as such was "Cauchemar Blanc" ("White Nightmare"), published in the magazine L'Écho des savanes, issue 8, 1974. The black & white story dealt with the racist murder of an immigrant of North-African descent, and stands out as one of the very few emphatic socially engaged works of Giraud. Bearing in mind Giraud's fascination with the Western genre in general and the cultural aspects of Native Americans in particular – and whose plight Giraud had always been sympathetic to (Note: While the Blueberry authors have always treated Native-Americans with sympathy in their series, it was in the last series outing of 2007, "Apaches", that Giraud took his most outspoken stance in regard to the plight of Native-Americans. In the album – composed from Blueberry's Geronimo recollection segments as featured in the five-volume OK Corral story-arc – Geronimo's son Dust is captive of the whites and sent to a Native-American boarding school, headed by a misguided and puritanical parson, who ruthlessly tries to "civilize" his wards. Though an anachronism in the comic, the boarding school is clearly patterned after the historical Carlisle Indian Industrial School, where cultural assimilation of Native Americans into white society was attempted, also referred to by outspoken activists as "cultural genocide", and the story stands out as Giraud's most outspoken condemnation of the white American's attempts to snuff out Native-American culture.) – it is hardly a surprise that two later examples of such rare works were Native-American themed. These concerned the 2-page short story "Wounded Knee", inspired by the eponymous 1973 incident staged by Oglala Lakota, and the 3-page short story "Discours du Chef Seattle", (Note: On the inspiration for "The Word of Chief Seattle" Giraud has stated in 1989, "Through a book from a young woman, Jeanine Fontaine, who had lived with Pilipino warriors. She cited the speech, as she was very touched by it. When I read it, it awoke an ancient anger within me, [the same anger as "Cauchemar Blanc" twenty years earlier], absolutely the same anger, the same outrage. And this is the extent of my political engagement. I take an emotional stance, when I'm deeply moved. Then I am unable to suppress the impulse to create a pamphlet!") first published in the artbook "Made in L.A." ("The Words of Chief Seattle", in Epic's "Ballad for a Coffin"). Giraud suddenly bursting out onto the comic scene as "Mœbius", caught European readership by surprise, and it took many of them, especially outside France, a couple of years before the realization had sunk in that "Jean Gir[raud]" and "Mœbius" were, physically at least, one and the same artist.

It was when he was brainstorming with the founding editors of the magazine (founded by former Pilote friends and co-artists), that Giraud came up with his first major Mœbius work, "Le bandard fou" ("The Horny Goof"). Released directly as album (a first for Mœbius comics) in black & white by the magazine's publisher, the humorous and satirical story dealt with a law-abiding citizen of the planet Souldaï, who awakens one day with a permanent erection, and therefore is pursued through space and time. When discounting the as "Gir" signed "La déviation", it is in this story that Giraud's signature, minute "Mœbius" art style, for which he became famed later, truly comes into its own. Another novelty introduced in the book is that the narrative is only related on the right-hand pages; the left-hand pages are taken up by one-page panels depicting an entirely unrelated cinematographic sequence of a man transforming after he has snapped his fingers. The story did raise some eyebrows with critics accusing Giraud of pornography at the time, but one reviewer put it in perspective when stating, "Peut-être Porno, mais Graphique!" ("Porn maybe, but Graphic Art for sure!"). In the editorial of the 1990 American edition, Giraud conceded that he was envious of what his former Pilote colleagues had achieved with L'Écho des savanes in regard to creating a free and creative environment he had already enjoyed at Hara-Kiri.

==== Métal Hurlant (1974–1982) ====
Mœbius cover art for the first Métal Hurlant issue and the second Heavy Metal issue (l), and the opening panel of Arzach (r).

In December 1974, Giraud became one of the founding members of the comics art group and publishing house "Les Humanoïdes Associés", together with fellow comic artists Jean-Pierre Dionnet, Philippe Druillet (likewise Pilote colleagues) and (outsider) Bernard Farkas, who took on the role of financial manager. In imitation of the example set by the L'Écho des savanes founding editors, this undertaking was therefore also an indirect result of the 1968 revolt. Together they started the monthly magazine Métal hurlant - "Screaming metal" - in January 1975 (at that time, due to the royalties conflict, Giraud had temporarily abandoned his Blueberry series). The translated version was known in the English-speaking world as Heavy Metal, and started its release in April 1977, actually introducing Giraud's work to North-American readership. Mœbius' famous serial "The Airtight Garage" and his groundbreaking "Arzach" both began in Métal hurlant. Unlike Hara-Kiri and L'Écho des savanes though, whose appeal has always remained somewhat limited to the socially engaged satire and underground comic scenes, it was Métal hurlant in particular that revolutionized the world of Franco-Belgian bandes dessinées, whereas its American cousin left an indelible impression on a generation of not only American comic artists, but on film makers as well.

Starting its publication in the first issue of Métal hurlant, "Arzach" is a wordless 1974–1975 comic, executed directly in color and created as a conscious attempt to breathe new life into the comic genre which at the time was dominated by American superhero comics in the United States, and by the traditional, adolescent oriented bandes dessinée in Europe. It tracks the journey of the title character flying on the back of his pterodactyl through a fantastic world mixing medieval fantasy with futurism. Unlike most science fiction comics, it is, save for the artfully executed story titles, entirely devoid of captions, speech balloons and written sound effects. It has been argued that the wordlessness provides the strip with a sense of timelessness, setting up Arzach's journey as a quest for eternal, universal truths. The short stories "L'Homme est-il bon?" ("Is Man Good?", in issue 10, 1976, after the first publication in Pilote, issue 744, 1974, which however woke Giraud up to the "unbearable realization" that he was "enriching" the publisher with his Mœbius work, thereby expediting his departure.), "Ballade" ("The Ballade", 1977 and inspired by the poem "Fleur" by French poet Arthur Rimbaud), "Ktulu" (issue 33bis, 1978, an H. P. Lovecraft-inspired story) and "Citadelle aveugle" ("The White Castle", in issue 51, 1980 and oddly enough signed as "Gir") were examples of additional stories Giraud created directly in color, shortly after "Arzach". 1976 saw the Métal hurlant, issues 7–8, publication of "The Long Tomorrow", written by Dan O'Bannon in 1975 during lulls in the pre-production of Jodorowsky's Dune.

His series The Airtight Garage, starting its magazine run in issue 6, 1976, is particularly notable for its non-linear plot, where movement and temporality can be traced in multiple directions depending on the readers' own interpretation even within a single planche (page or picture). The series tells of Major Grubert, who is constructing his own multi-level universe on an asteroid named Fleur (from the "Bandard fou" universe incidentally, and the first known instance of the artist's attempts of tying all his "Mœbius" creations into one coherent Airtight Garage universe), where he encounters a wealth of fantastic characters including Michael Moorcock's creation Jerry Cornelius.

1978 marked the publication of the 54-page "Les yeux du chat" ("Eyes of the Cat"). The dark, disturbing and surreal tale dealt with a blind boy in a non-descript empty cityscape, who has his pet eagle scout for eyes, which it finds by taking these from a street cat and offering them to his awaiting companion who, while grateful, expresses his preference for the eyes of a child. The story premise originated from a brainstorming session Alejandro Jodorowsky had with his fellows of the Académie Panique, a group concentrated on chaotic and surreal performance art, as a response to surrealism becoming mainstream. Jodorowsky worked out the story premise as a therapy to alleviate the depression he was in after the failure of his Dune project and presented the script to Giraud in 1977. Deeming the story too short for a regular, traditional comic, it was Giraud who suggested the story to be told on single panel pages. On recommendation of Jodorowsky, he refined the format by relating the eagle's quest on the right-hand pages, while depicting the awaiting boy in smaller single panel left-hand pages from a contra point-of-view. Giraud furthermore greatly increased his already high level of detail by making extensive use of zipatone for the first time. Considered a key and seminal work, both for its art and storytelling, setting Jodorowsky off on his career as comic writer, the art evoked memories of the wood engravings from the 19th century, including those of Gustave Doré, that Giraud discovered and admired in the books of his grandparents when he was living there in his childhood. However, it—like "La déviation"—has remained somewhat of a one-shot in Giraud's body of work in its utilization of such a high level of detail. The story, printed on yellow paper to accentuate the black & white art, was originally a limited edition gift item for customers. It was only after expensive pirate editions started to appear that the publisher decided to make the work available commercially on a wider scale, starting in 1981.

In a certain way "Les yeux du chat" concluded a phase that had started with "La Déviation". The very first "Mœbius" anthology collection the publisher released as such, was the 1980–1985 Moebius œuvres complètes six-volume collection. It also concluded a phase in which Giraud was preoccupied in a "characteristic period in his life" in which he was "very somber and pessimistic", resulting in several of his "Mœbius" stories of that period ending in death and destruction. These included the poetic "Ballade", in which Giraud killed off the two protagonists, something he came to regret a decade later in this particular case.

Mœbius cover art for Humanoids Publishing's 2014 US hardcover trade collection of The Incal.

In the magazine's issue 58 of 1980 Giraud started his famous L'Incal series in his third collaboration with Jodorowsky. However, Giraud felt that his break-out success as "Mœbius" had come at a cost. He had left Pilote to escape the pressure he was forced to work under, seeking complete creative freedom, but now it was increasingly becoming "as stifling as it had been before with Blueberry", as he conceded in 1982, adding philosophically, "The more you free yourself, the more powerless you become!". In Métal Hurlant, issue 82, later that year, an overworked Giraud stated, "I will finish the Blueberry series, I will finish the John Difool [Incal] series and then I'm done. Then I will quit comics!" At the time he had just finished working as storyboard, and production design artist on the Movie Tron, something he had enjoyed immensely. Giraud did not quit comics, though he did take action to escape the hectic Parisian comic scene in 1980 by moving with his family to a small village near Pau at the foothills of the Pyrenees. Giraud then started to take an interest in the teachings of Jean-Paul Appel-Guéry, the leader of the UFO religion Iso-Zen, (Note: "Appel-Guéry encouraged Mœbius to tap into the more positive zones of his subconscious. 'Most of the people that were studying spirituality with Appel-Guéry did not know much about comics, but they immediately picked on the morbid, and overall negative feelings that permeated my work,' said Moebius. 'So I began to feel ashamed, and I decided to do something really different, just to show them that I could do it.'") becoming an active member of his group and partaking in their gatherings.

==== Tahiti (1983–1984) ====
From 1983 to 2001 he created his six-volume fantasy series Le Monde d'Edena, (The Aedena Cycle). The stories were strongly influenced by the teachings of Appel-Guéry and Guy-Claude Burger's instinctotherapy. In effect, Giraud and his family did join Appel-Guéry's commune on Tahiti in 1983, until late 1984, when the family moved to the United States, where Giraud set up shop first in Santa Monica, and subsequently in Venice and Woodland Hills, California. Giraud's one-shot comic book "La nuit de l'étoile" was co-written by Appel-Guéry, and has been the most visible manifestation of Giraud's stay on Tahiti, aside from the artbooks "La memoire du futur" and "Venise celeste". Concurrently collaborating on "La nuit de l'étoile" was young artist Marc Bati, also residing at the commune at the time, and for whom Giraud afterwards wrote the comic series Altor (The Magic Crystal), while in the US. It was under the influence of Appel-Guéry's teachings that Giraud conceived a third pseudonym, Jean Gir – formally introduced to the public as "Jean Gir, Le Nouveau Mœbius" in "Venise celeste", though Giraud had by the time of publication already dispensed with the pseudonym himself – which appeared on the art he created while on Tahiti, though not using it for his Aedena Cycle. Having to move stateside for work served Giraud well, as he became increasingly disenchanted at a later stage with the way Appel-Guéry ran his commune, in the process dispensing with his short-lived third pseudonym. His stay at the commune though, had practical implications on his personal life; Giraud gave up eating meat, smoking, coffee, alcohol and, for the time being, the use of mind-expanding substances, adhering to his newfound abstinence for the most part for the remainder of his life.

During his stay on Tahiti, Giraud co-founded his second publishing house under two concurrent imprints, Éditions Gentiane (predominantly for his work as Gir, most notably Blueberry) and Aedena (predominantly for his work as Mœbius, and not entirely by coincidence named after the series he was working on at the time), together with friend and former editor at Les Humanoïdes Associés, Jean Annestay, for the express purpose to release his work in a more artful manner, such as limited edition art prints, art books ("La memoire du futur" was released in 1983 under the Gentiane imprint) and art portfolios. Both men had already released in 1980 the very first such art book in the Humanoïdes days (Mœbius 30 x 30), and the format then conceived – a large 30x30 cm book format, with art organized around themes, introduced by philosophical poetry by Mœbius – was adhered to for later such releases.

==== Marvel Comics (1984–1989) ====
There were thousands of professionals who knew my work. That has always amazed me every time I entered some graphics, or animation studio, at Marvel or even at George Lucas'. Mentioning the name Jean Giraud did not cause any of the present pencillers, colorists or storyboard artists to even bat an eye. Yet, whenever I introduced myself as "Mœbius", all of them jumped up to shake my hand. It was incredible!

— Giraud, Cagnes-sur-Mer 1988, on his notoriety as "Mœbius" in the United States.

Mœbius cover for the 1998 edition of Silver Surfer: Parable on the left, and the Mœbius cover of the 1987 US Epic edition of The Airtight Garage on the right.

After having arrived in California, Giraud's wife Claudine set up Giraud's third publishing house Starwatcher Graphics in 1985, essentially the US branch of Gentiane/Aedena with the same goals, resulting in the release of, among others, the extremely limited art portfolio La Cité de Feu, a collaborative art project of Giraud with Geoff Darrow. However, due to their unfamiliarity with the American publishing world, the company did not do well, and to remedy the situation Claudine hired the French/American editor couple Jean-Marc and Randy Lofficier, whom she had met at the summer 1985 San Diego ComicCon, as translators and editors-in-chief for Starwatcher, also becoming shareholders in the company. Already veterans of the US publishing world (and Mœbius fans), it was the Lofficier couple, represented by agent David Scroggy, that managed to convince editor-in-chief Archie Goodwin of Marvel Comics to publish most of Moebius' hitherto produced work on a wider scale in the US—in contrast with the Heavy Metal niche market releases by HM Communications in the late 1970s—in graphic novel format trade editions, under its Epic imprint from 1987 to 1994. These incidentally, included three of Mœbius' latter-day art books, as well as the majority of his Blueberry Western comic.

It was for the Marvel/Epic publication effort that it was decided to dispense with the "Jean [Gir]aud"/"Mœbius" dichotomy—until then strictly adhered-to by the artist—as both the artist's given name and his Blueberry creation were all but unknown in the English speaking world. This was contrary to his reputation as "Mœbius", already acquired in the Heavy Metal days, and from then on used for all his work in the English speaking world (and Japan), though the dichotomy remained elsewhere, including native France.

A two-issue Silver Surfer miniseries (later collected as Silver Surfer: Parable), written by Stan Lee and drawn by Giraud (as Mœbius), was published through Marvel's Epic Comics imprint in 1988 and 1989. According to Giraud, this was his first time working under the Marvel method instead of from a full script, and he has admitted to being baffled by the fact that he already had a complete story synopsis on his desk only two days after he had met Stan Lee for the first time, having discussed what Giraud had assumed was a mere proposition over lunch. This miniseries won the Eisner Award for best finite/limited series in 1989. Mœbius' version was discussed in the 1995 submarine thriller Crimson Tide by two sailors pitting his version against those of Jack Kirby, with the main character played by Denzel Washington, emphasizing the Kirby one being the better of the two. Becoming aware of the reference around 1997, Giraud was later told around 2005 by the movie's director Tony Scott, that it was he who had written in the dialog as an homage to the artist on behalf of his brother Ridley, a Mœbius admirer. An amused Giraud quipped, "It's better than a big stature, because in a way, I can not dream of anything better to be immortal [than] being in a movie about submarines!"

As a result, from his cooperation with Marvel, Giraud delved deeper into the American superhero mythology and created superhero art stemming from both Marvel and DC Comics, which were sold as art prints, posters or included in calendars, besides becoming featured as comic book covers from both publishers. Even as late as 1997, Giraud had created cover art for two DC comic book outings, Hardware (Vol. 1, issue 49, March 1997) and Static (Vol. 1, issue 45, March 1997), after an earlier cover for Marvel Tales (Vol. 2, issue 253, September 1991). In 1993, Giraud embarked upon a venture into that other staple of American pop culture, trading cards : trading card company Comic Images released a "Mœbius Collector Cards", featuring characters and imagery from all over his Mœbius universe, though his Western work was excluded. Images were especially created by Giraud the year previously.

Although Giraud had taken up residence in California for five years – holding a temporary residence (the O-1 "Extraordinary Ability" category, including the "International Artist" status) visa – he maintained a transient lifestyle, as his work had him frequently travel to Belgium and native France (maintaining a home in Paris), as well as to Japan, for extended periods of time. His stay in the United States was an inspiration for his aptly called Made in L.A. art book, and much of his art he had produced in this period of time, including his super hero art, was reproduced in this, and the follow-up art book Fusions, the latter of which having seen a translation in English by Epic.

Giraud's extended stay in the US, garnered him a 1986 Inkpot Award, an additional 1991 Eisner Award, as well as three Harvey Awards in the period 1988–1991 for the various graphic novel releases by Marvel. It was in this period that Giraud, who had already picked up Spanish as a second language as a result from his various trips to Mexico and his dealings with Jodorowsky and his retinue, also picked up sufficient language skills to communicate in English.

=== Later work (1990–2012) ===
In late summer 1989, Giraud returned to France definitively. His family had already returned to France earlier, as his children wanted to start their college education in their native county and wife Claudine had accompanied them to set up home in Paris.

Subsequent changes in his personal life were also accompanied with changes in his business holdings during 1988–1990. His co-founded publishing house Gentiane/Aedena went into receivership in 1988, going bankrupt a short time thereafter. The American subsidiary Starwatcher Graphics followed in its wake around the turn of the millennium. Also in 1988, Giraud sold his shares in Les Humanoïdes Associés to Fabrice Giger, though it remained the regular publisher of his Mœbius work from the Métal hurlant-era, including L'Incal and some other later titles such as the sequel to The Airtight Garage, "L'Homme du Ciguri" in 1995. Together with Claudine he founded Stardom in 1990, his first true family operated business without any other third-party participation according to Giraud, with the mini art portfolio "Mockba - carnet de bord" becoming the company's first recorded publication. Apart from being a publishing house, it was concurrently an art gallery, located rue Falguière in Paris, organizing themed exhibitions on a regular basis. In 1997, the company was renamed Moebius Production. The company, in both publishing and art gallery iterations, is as of 2026 still being run by second wife Isabelle who, with her sister Claire Champeval, had taken over the function of publishing editor and co-ownership from Claudine (explaining the renaming of the company), after the latter's marriage with Giraud was dissolved in 1994.

The first thing Giraud did creatively upon his return was to finish up on the Blueberry album "Arizona Love" on his own after his longtime writing partner Jean-Michel Charlier had died on 10 July 1989. Due to his intimate twenty-five year familiarity with both the series and its writer, it was a foregone conclusion that Giraud would from then on take on the scripting of the main Blueberry series as well, especially since it was already agreed upon in the "contracts signed with Jean-Michel" that "the survivor would take over the series". Stunned by the sudden death of his longtime co-worker though, he could not bring himself to work on the art for Blueberry afterwards for nearly five years before he embarked on Blueberry again as artist. Giraud stated that the series had lost its "father", and that the "mother needed time to mourn". Nonetheless, he did embark on the Marshal Blueberry spin-off series in 1990 as writer (leaving the artwork firstly to William Vance and subsequently to Michel Rouge), wanting to pay homage to the legacy of his late writing partner by creating a story in his spirit, or as Giraud had put it, "{A]nd [I] said to myself: Well, I'm going to see if I'm able to write a story à la Charlier. So I wrote this scenario, not too bad, but quite traditional, quite classic." In similar vein, Giraud took up the writing for the other Charlier/Gir western creation, Jim Cutlass, that Charlier had actually been in the process of revitalizing in the year before his death, and for which he had already contracted Christian Rossi for the artwork, besides having already started on the scenario. After having added six more volumes (published at Casterman) to the once one-shot series, the series folded in 1999 due to the fact that it was not nearly as commercially successful as Blueberry had been.

Under his "Mœbius" pseudonym, Giraud concurrently continued to work on The Aedena Cycle and the Madwoman of the Sacred Heart trilogy, both of which started in the US and completed in 2001 and 1998 respectively, after which he concentrated on Blueberry's "OK Corral" cycle, started in 1994 upon his return to France. While Giraud was in the midst of "OK Corral" cycle, he also embarked on a new sequel cycle of his acclaimed Incal main series, called Après l'Incal (After the Incal). Yet, after he had penciled the first outing in the series, "Le nouveau rêve", he found himself confronted with "too many things that attract me, too many desires in all the senses", causing him to be no longer able to "devote myself to the bande dessinée as befitting a professional in the traditional sense". Despite repeated pleas to convince Giraud otherwise, it left writer Jodorowsky with no other recourse than to start anew with a new artist. This insight had repercussions though, as Giraud, after he had finished the "OK Corral" cycle in 2005, no longer continued to produce comics and/or art on a commercial base, but rather on a project and/or personal base, usually under the aegis of his own publishing house Mœbius Production.

As Mœbius Production, Giraud published from 2004 to 2010 Inside Mœbius (French text despite English title), an illustrated autobiographical fantasy in six hardcover volumes totaling 700 pages. Pirandello-like, he appears in cartoon form as both creator and protagonist trapped within the story alongside his younger self and several longtime characters such as Blueberry, Arzak (the latest re-spelling of the Arzach character's name), Major Grubert (from The Airtight Garage) and others.

Jean Giraud drew a volume of the XIII series titled "La Version Irlandaise" ("The Irish Version") from a script by Jean Van Hamme, to accompany the final volume by the regular team Jean Van Hamme–William Vance, "Le dernier round" ("The Last Round"), published in 2007. The contribution was also a professional courtesy to the series' artist, Vance, who had previously provided the artwork for the first two titles in the Giraud-written Marshall Blueberry spin-off series.

Late in life, Giraud also decided to revive his seminal Arzak character in an elaborate new adventure series; the first (and last in hindsight) volume of a planned trilogy, Arzak - Destination Tassili, appeared in 2009. He also added to the Airtight Garage series with two volumes entitled "Le chasseur déprime" (2008) and "Major" (2011), as well as the art book "La faune de Mars" (2011), print run by Mœbius Production. By this time, Giraud created his comic art on a specialized graphic computer tablet, as its enlargement features had become an indispensable aid, because of his failing eyesight.

Creating comics became increasingly difficult for Giraud, as his eyesight started to fail him in his last years, having undergone severe surgery in 2010 to stave off blindness in his left eye, and it was mainly for this reason that Giraud increasingly concentrated on creating single-piece art, both as "Gir" and as "Mœbius", on larger canvases on either commission basis or under the aegis of Mœbius Production.

=== Death ===
Giraud died in Montrouge, on 10 March 2012, aged 73, after a long battle with cancer. His death was expedited by a lymphoma-induced pulmonary embolism. Fellow comic artist François Boucq (incidentally, the artist pegged by Giraud in person for the artwork of the canceled Blueberry 1900 project) stated that Mœbius was a "master of realist drawing with a real talent for humour, which he was still demonstrating with the nurses [...] in his hospital bed a fortnight ago". Giraud was buried on 15 March, in the Montparnasse Cemetery, after the funeral services, held in the Saint Clotilde Basilica. Besides friends and representatives from the Franco-Belgian comic world, the French government was represented by its Minister of Culture, Frédéric Mitterrand, nephew of the former President of France François Mitterrand, who had personally awarded Giraud with his first civilian knighthood twenty-seven years earlier. Giraud left his estate to his second wife Isabelle and his four children.

==== Biographies ====
Throughout his entire career, Jean Giraud gave numerous interviews, but it is the series of interview sessions conducted over the course of four decades by comics specialist Numa Sadoul that stand out for its all encompassing scope of Giraud's entire career, from the mid-1970s onward until the latter's death in 2012. It resulted in three consecutive, chronologically organized interview books, Mister Mœbius et Docteur Gir (1976), Entretiens avec Mœbius (1991), and Docteur Mœbius et Mister Gir (2015), the latter two being each an edited, updated and expanded version of the previous one – and each title incidentally, featuring an entirely different selection of art. Excepting parts of the first book in Schtroumpf: Les cahiers de la BD (issue 25, July 1974), none of the later interviews had seen prior magazine publication. The Schtroumpf interview excerpt was by Giraud poured into a humorous eight-page autobiographical black & white comic (entitled "Entretien avec Jean Giraud", in english "Mœbius Circa '74"), which was a precursor to Giraud's autobiographical Inside Mœbius comic books (what he later himself realized, "Merde, that is exactly like the comic I have done with Numa!"). Posthumously published, the 2015 title was fully sanctioned and endorsed by Giraud's widow Isabelle and has therefore become the closest approximation of an "official biography".

Noteworthy were the testimonials Sadoul collected from seminal persons in Giraud's life and career (his mother, first wife Claudine, his mentor Jijé...), as well as the fact that Giraud spoke very freely about the aspects of his life and career including the more contentious ones, such as his mind-expanding substance use, his extremely strained relationship with the aforementioned Philippe Charlier, his fear of a painful death because of his progressing cancer... Author Sadoul acknowledged that the three series of interview sessions were snapshots in time of Giraud's life and career, causing the artist to occasionally contradict himself in later life but chose not to redact or edit such earlier made statements in order to reflect truthfully the spiritual development of the artist. Despite the worldwide renown Giraud/Mœbius has acquired, Sadoul's biography has until late-2023 only seen three other-language editions, a 1992 German 2nd edition (ISBN 3551019002), a 2017 Japanese 3rd edition (ISBN 9784796876605), and a 2023 English 3rd edition release (ISBN 9781506713434).

Text autobiography Histoire de mon double, published as an unillustrated paperback in 1999 was the "biography written by Giraud on Mœbius & vice versa", but constituted what Sadoul has coined a "snapshot in time", aside from the obvious fact that the last phase of the artist's career was not covered. Giraud himself considered his "enhanced" autobiography on which he had worked for a year, a "funny" piece of work, conceding that accuracy was left to be desired as he could not be bothered to correct mistakes made therein, finding "flavor" in the small inaccuracies.

A more traditional first-time biography, titled "Jean Giraud alias Mœbius", by French BD publicist Christophe Quillien, was shortly afterwards published on 17 May 2024.

=== Illustrator and author ===
Giraud had throughout his entire career made illustrations for books, magazines, music productions (though playing the piano and electric guitar, Giraud was, unlike his second son Raphaël, regrettably not a creative musician himself by his own admission, but did have a lifelong fascination with jazz), but also promotional art for commercial institutions such as banks and corporations. A notable early example of the latter, concerned the Blueberry art he created in 1978 for the Spanish jeans manufacturer Lois Jeans & Jackets; Aside from being traditionally run as an advertisement in numerous magazines, it was also blown up to gigantic, mural-like dimensions and as posters plastered on walls and billboards. As book illustrator, Giraud illustrated for example the 1987 first edition of the science fiction novel "Project Pendulum" by Robert Silverberg, and the 1994 French edition of the novel "The Alchemist" by Paulo Coelho. The subsequent year Giraud followed up in the same vein as the Coelho novel, with his cover and interior illustrations for a French 1995 reprint of "Ballades" from the French medieval poet François Villon, itself followed by similar work for Jean-Jacques Launier's 2001 new-age novel "La mémoire de l'âme". Much of this non-comic art, has been reproduced in the artbooks that were released over the years.

In 1999, Giraud's illustrations appeared in a soft cover edition of Dante Alighieri's La Divina Commedia, published by the Nuages Gallery in Milan. As "Mœbius" he illustrated the "Paradiso" volume, while the two others, "Inferno" and "Purgatorio", were illustrated by Lorenzo Mattotti and Milton Glaser respectively. The edition was published under the Mœbius name. Giraud's illustrations for "Paradiso" take heavy inspiration from the engravings of the Divine Comedy by Gustave Doré, with compositions often approaching an exact match. Giraud acknowledged this influence directly, praising Doré's work and remarking how he sometimes literally used tracing paper to sketch compositions. Though another prominent example of Giraud's non-comic book work, the influences from his science fiction and fantasy comics shine through.

An out-of-the-ordinary latter-day contribution as such, constituted his illustrations as "Mœbius" for the Thursday 6 March 2008 issue of the Belgian newspaper Le Soir. His illustrations accompanied news articles throughout the newspaper, providing a Mœbiusienne look on events. In return, the newspaper, for the occasion entitled "Le Soir par (by) Mœbius", featured two half-page editorials on the artist (pp. 20 & 37).

Under the names Giraud, Gir and Mœbius, he also wrote several comics for other comic artists, and the early ones included Jacques Tardi and Claude Auclair.

As author on personal title, Giraud has – apart from his own bande dessinée scripts – written philosophical poetry that accompanied his art in his Mœbius artbooks of the 1980s and 1990s. He also wrote the "Story Notes" editorials for the American Epic publications, providing background information on his work contained therein.

=== Films ===
Tron was not a big hit. The movie went out in theaters in the same week as E.T. and, oh, that was a disaster for it. There was also Blade Runner and Star Trek that summer so it was a battle of giants. Tron was a piece of energy trying to survive. It is still alive. It survives. And the new movie is what Steven wanted to do back then but at that time CG was very odd and we were pioneers. I almost did the first computer-animated feature after that, it was called Star Watcher, we had the story, we had the preparation done, we were ready to start. But it came apart; the company did not give us the approval. It was too far, the concept to do everything in computer animation. We were waiting, waiting, and then our producer died in a car accident. Everything collapsed. That was my third contribution to animation and my worst experience. Les Maîtres du temps is a strange story, it's a small movie, and cheap — incredibly cheap –it was more than independent. When I saw the film for the first time I was ashamed. It's not a Disney movie, definitely. But because the movie has, maybe a flavor, a charm, it is still alive after all that time. More than 35 years now and it is still here.

— Giraud, Burbank, California, 2011, on his animation movie experiences.

Giraud's friend Jean-Claude Mézières has divulged in the 1970s that their very first outing into the world of cinema concerned a 1957 animated Western, unsurprisingly, considering their shared passion for the genre, "Giraud, with his newfound prestige because of his trip to Mexico, started a pro career at Cœurs Valiants, but together with two other friends we tackled a very ambitious project first: a cartoon western for which Giraud drew the sets and the main characters. Alas, rather disappointingly, we had to stop after only 45 seconds!" It was not until the mid-1970s that Giraud received an invitation of Alejandro Jodorowsky to work on his planned adaptation of Frank Herbert's Dune, which was however abandoned in pre-production. Jodorowsky's Dune, a 2013 American-French documentary directed by Frank Pavich, explores Jodorowsky's unsuccessful attempt. Giraud, a non-English speaker at the time, later admitted that the prospect of travelling to Los Angeles filled him with trepidation, initially causing him to procrastinate. It was colleague Philippe Druillet who pushed him to up and go. Jodorowsky set up a pre-production unit in Paris consisting, besides Giraud, of Chris Foss, a British illustrator, Dan O'Bannon, an american visual effects supervisor and H. R. Giger, a Swiss artist. Giraud created over 3,000 pieces of artwork for the storyboard but the project fell apart for financial reasons. Giraud's presence was not always required on the project, giving him ample time to pursue his other work, especially for Métal Hurlant, and to finish up on Blueberry's "Angel Face", which he ultimately did in record time.

Despite Jodorowsky's project falling through, it had attracted the attention of other movie makers. One of them was Ridley Scott who managed to reassemble a large part of Jodorowsky's original creative team, including Giraud, for his 1979 science fiction thriller Alien. Hired as a concept artist, Giraud's stay on the movie lasted only a few days, as he had obligations elsewhere. Nonetheless, his designs for the Nostromo crew attire, and their spacesuits in particular, were almost one-on-one adopted by Scott and appearing onscreen as designed, resulting in what Giraud had coined "two weeks of work and ten years of fallout in media and advertising". Scott was taken with Giraud's art, having cited "The Long Tomorrow" as an influence on his second major movie Blade Runner of 1982, and invited him again for both this, and his subsequent third major movie Legend of 1985, which Giraud had to decline in both cases for, again, obligations elsewhere.

1981 saw the release of the animated film Heavy Metal, produced by Ivan Reitman. The heavily "Arzach"-inspired last section of the movie, "Taarna", has led to the persistent misconception, especially held in the United States, that Giraud had provided characters and situations for the segment, albeit uncredited. Giraud however, had already emphatically squashed that particular misconception himself on an early occasion, "I had absolutely nothing to do with it," stated the artist in 1982, "Sure, the people who made the movie were inspired by quite a few things from "Arzach"," further explaining that, while the American producers had indeed intended to use the artist's material from the eponymous magazine, there were legalities involved between the American and French mother magazines, because the latter had financial interests in Laloux's Les Maîtres du temps that was concurrently in development, and in which Giraud was very much involved with. The American producers went ahead regardless of the agreements made between them and Métal hurlant. While not particularly pleased with the fact, Giraud was amused when third parties wanted to sue the Americans on his behalf. Giraud however, managed to convince his editor-in-chief Jean-Pierre Dionnet (one of his co-founding friends of Métal hurlant) to let the issue slide, as he found "all that fuss with lawyers" not worth his while, aside from the incongruous circumstance that the French magazine was running advertisements for the American movie.

Still, Alien led to two other movie assignments in 1982, this time as both concept and storyboard artist. The first one concerned the Disney science fiction movie Tron, whose director Steven Lisberger specifically requested Giraud, after he had discovered his work in Heavy Metal magazine. The second assignment concerned Giraud's collaboration with director René Laloux to create the science fiction feature-length animated movie Les Maîtres du temps (released in English as Time Masters) based on a novel by Stefan Wul. He and director Rene Laloux shared the award for Best Children's Film at the Fantafestival that year. For the latter, Giraud was also responsible for the poster art and the comic adaptation of the same title, with some of his concept and storyboard art featured in a "making-of" book to boot. Excepting Les Maîtres du temps, Giraud's movie work had him travel to Los Angeles for longer periods of time.

Giraud movie poster art for Touche pas à la femme blanche ! on the left, and the one he created for Tusk on the right.

Outside his actual involvement with motion pictures, Giraud was in this period of time also occasionally commissioned to create poster art for, predominantly European, movies. Movies for which Giraud, also as "Mœbius", created poster art included, Touche pas à la femme blanche ! (1974 as Gir, three 120x160 cm versions), S*P*Y*S (1974, unsigned, American movie but poster art for release in France), Vous ne l'emporterez pas au paradis (1975, unsigned), Les Chiens (1979 as Mœbius, rejected, used as cover for Taboo 4), Tusk (1980 as Giraud, a Jodorowsky film), and La Trace (1983 as Mœbius).

While Giraud was residing in Appel-Guéry's commune, he, together with Appel-Guéry and another member of the commune, Paula Salomon, came up with a story premise for a major animated science fiction movie called Internal Transfer, which was endowed with the English title Starwatcher – after which Giraud's American publishing house was named. Slated for the production was Arnie Wong, whom Giraud had met during the production of Tron (and, incidentally, one of the animators of the vaunted "Taarna" segment of the Heavy Metal movie), and it was actually Disney whom Giraud offered the production first. Disney, at the time not believing in the viability of such a production in animation, declined. Another member of the commune fronted some of the money for the project to proceed, and the production was moved to Wong's animation studio in Los Angeles. It was this circumstance that provided Giraud with his alibi to leave Appel-Guéry's commune and settle in California – and the reason why he had to decline Ridley Scott for his Legend movie. Much to Giraud's disappointment and frustration though, the project eventually fell apart for several extraneous reasons, most notably for lack of funding. Still, the concept art he provided for the project served as the basis for his first collaboration with Geof Darrow, whom he had also met previously on the production of Tron, on their 1985 City of Fire art portfolio. Some of the concept art was reprinted in the art book "Made in L.A.".

Concurrent with his career as a comic artist in the United States, invitations followed to participate as concept artist on Masters of the Universe (1987), Willow (1988), The Abyss (1989), and finally Yutaka Fujioka's Japanese-American animated feature film Little Nemo: Adventures in Slumberland (1989), for which he was not only the conceptual designer, but also the story writer. It was for this movie that Giraud resided in Japan for an extended period of time. Giraud followed up on his involvement with Little Nemo by writing the first two outings of the 1994–2000 French graphic novel series of the same name, drawn by Bruno Marchand.

In January 1992, the French newspaper Le Monde reported on a computer animated movie that was under development at the company Vidéosystem. It actually concerned a second attempt to get Starwatcher on the silver screen, but just like its 1984 predecessor, it eventually failed to come to fruition. Afterwards, Giraud made original character designs and did visual development for Warner Bros.' partly animated 1996 movie Space Jam. 1997 saw his participation as concept artist on Luc Besson's science fiction epic The Fifth Element, which was of great personal importance for Giraud as it meant working together with his lifelong friend Jean-Claude Mézières, coming full circle after their very first aborted 1957 attempt at creating a motion picture. Concurrently, Giraud's oldest child, daughter Hélène, was employed on the movie in a similar function, albeit uncredited. Giraud's experience on the movie was however somewhat marred by the 2004 lawsuit publisher Les Humanoïdes Associés (ostensibly on his behalf like the earlier 1981 intent which Giraud had then successfully prevented) and Alejandro Jodorowsky leveled against Besson for alleged plagiarism of L'Incal, a lawsuit they lost.

2005 saw the release of the Chinese movie Thru the Moebius Strip, based on a story by Giraud who also served as the production designer and the co-producer, and which reunited him with Arnie Wong, whereas his stint as concept designer on the 2012 animated science fiction movie Strange Frame has become Giraud's final recorded motion picture contribution.

==== Movie adaptations ====
Cauchemar Blanc DVD cover by Mœbius (excerpt from the titular bande dessinée)

In 1991 his graphic novel short, "Cauchemar Blanc", was cinematized by Mathieu Kassovitz, winning Kassovitz (but not Giraud) two film awards. With Arzak Rhapsody, Giraud saw his ambitions as a full-fledged animation movie maker at least in part fulfilled. A 2002 series for French television broadcaster France 2, it consisted of fourteen four minute long animated vignettes, based on Giraud's seminal character, for which he did the writing, drawings and co-production. Young daughter Nausicaa had voice-over appearances in three of the episodes together with her father.

"The Lost Dutchman's Mine" story cycle of the Blueberry series was adapted for the screen in 2004, by Jan Kounen, as Blueberry: L'expérience secrète. Three prior attempts to bring Blueberry to the silver screen had fallen through two decades earlier; in 1986 Charlier disclosed how American actor Martin Kove had actually already been signed to play the titular role for the first two early-1980s attempts. The first attempt failed because American producers intended a complete script rewrite turning Blueberry into a completely unrecognizable standard western. The second attempt suffered even worse as its American producer wanted to do a film inspired by Raiders of the Lost Ark (the box office success of 1981). The Blueberry creators eventually managed to buy back the rights. The third attempt concerned a European only endeavor, which had at one point actually involved Sergio Leone, according to Charlier, and was actually conceived as a television movie series, more faithfully adhering to the main comic series. That 1983 attempt petered out without so much as a whimper, most likely due to lack of interest on the part of European investors.

2010 saw the adaptation of "La planète encore" ("The Still Planet"), a short story from the Le Monde d'Edena universe – and which had won him his 1991 Eisner Award – into an animated short. Moebius Production served as a production company, with Isabelle Giraud serving as one of its producers. Giraud himself was one of the two directors of the short and it premiered at the «Mœbius transe forme» exposition at the Fondation Cartier pour l'art contemporain in Paris.

In November 2021 it was announced Oscar winner Taika Waititi would direct the screen adaptation of Jodorowsky/Moebius's graphic novel The Incal and co-write the script with frequent collaborators Jemaine Clement and Peter Warren.

=== Video games ===
Mœbius box cover art for Fade to Black on the left, cover art for Panzer Dragoon in the middle, and costume concept art for Pilgrim: Faith as a Weapon on the right.

Giraud was in the mid-1990s approached to provide the box cover art for two video games that were released in 1995 : Fade to Black (developed by the US Delphine Software International) and Panzer Dragoon (developed by the Japanese Sega Corporation).

Giraud was approached for more substantial video game contributions when developer Arxel Tribe asked Giraud to become a concept designer for the 1997 Pilgrim: Faith as a Weapon game (Infogrames), adapted by Paulo Coelho himself (for whom Giraud had illustrated his Alchemist French-edition novel three years earlier) from his 1987 book The Pilgrimage. As Mœbius, Giraud designed among others the costumes for the game.

Seven years later the Japanese 2004 video game Seven Samurai 20XX was released, for which Giraud was asked to provide the character concept designs. This was his last known video game contribution.

=== Exhibitions ===
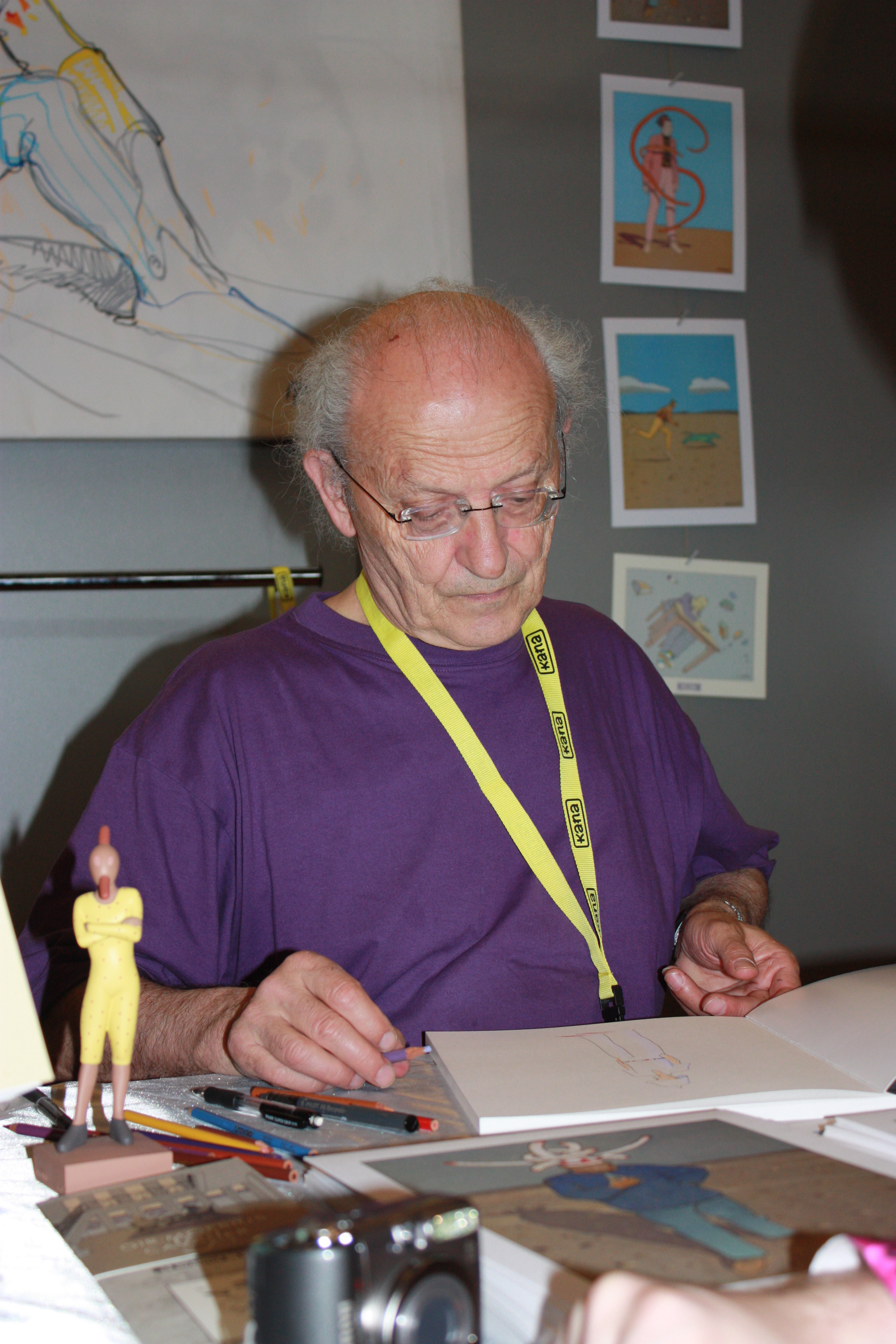
Mœbius signing at the 2008 Parisian Japan Expo, where he had his own booth in recognition for his contributions to Japanese manga and animation

Part of the "many desires" that increasingly attracted Giraud later in life, steering him away from creating traditional bandes dessinées, was his personal fascination and involvement with the many exhibitions dedicated to his work, that started to proliferate from the mid-1990s onward not only in native France, but internationally as well, causing him to frequently travel abroad for extended periods of time, with the prestigious high-profile 2010 «Mœbius transe forme» exposition in Paris becoming the apotheosis, which the museum had called "the first major exhibition in Paris devoted to the work of Jean Giraud."

- 28 June-25 August 1991: «Mœbius Giraud, 35 ans d'images», Maison de la culture Frontenac, Montréal, Canada
- 26 April-16 August 1995:«Mœbius: a retrospective», Cartoon Art Museum, San Francisco, US
- December 1995: «Wanted: Blueberry», Arthaud Grenette mega-bookstore, Grenoble, France
- 19 September-9 October 1996: «Jean Giraud - Blueberry's» (for the release of the "Blueberry's" artbook by Stardom), Stardom Gallery, Paris, France
- August 1997: «Giraud/Mœbius» themed Festival BD de Solliès-Ville, France
- 10 October–9 November 1997: «Mœbius: Infinito», Deposito ferroviario ai Lolli, Palermo, and on 7 February–29 March 1998, Palazzo Querini Stampalia, Venice, Italy
- 29 November 1997 – 11 January 1998: «Mœbius: Visoni de fine mellennio», Palazzo Bagati Valsecchi, Milan, Italy
- 30 June-14 November 1999: «1 Monde Réel», Fondation Cartier, Paris, France
- 26 January-3 September 2000: «Trait de Génie Giraud», Centre national de la bande dessinée et de l'image, Angoulême, France
- 10 June-9 July 2000 : «Mœbius/Giraud - Genius des Phantastischen», Städtische Galerie, Erlangen, Germany
- 10 October 2000-7 January 2001 : «Maîtres de la bande dessinée européenne» (with Hergé, Franquin...), Bibliothèque nationale de France, Paris, France
- 3-24 October 2001 : «Mystère Montrouge», Hôtel de ville, Montrouge, France
- June 2003: «The world of Mœbius», Art Museum, Kemi, Finland
- 16 November-31 December 2003: «Giraud-Moebius», Grand Manège, Liège, Belgium
- 17 January–7 March 2004: «Mœbius : Welten», Badischer Kunstverein, Karlsruhe, Germany
- 4 March-28 April 2004: «L'Elixir du Docteur Gir/Moebius», Galerie Arludik, Paris, France
- 1 December 2004-13 March 2005: «Giraud/Mœbius & Hayao Miyazaki», Musée de la Monnaie de Paris, France
- 15 March-15 April 2005: «Jean Giraud: dessins et planches originales de Dust», Galerie Arludik, Paris, France.
- 22 June-21 July 2005: «Mythes Grecs», Galerie Stardom, Paris, France
- 13 December 2005: «Jardins d'Eros», Galerie Stardom, Paris, France
- 3 February - 21 may 2006 : «Dormir, rêver... et autres nuits» (with Mc Cay, Ben, Warhol...), CAPC - musée d’Art contemporain, Bordeaux, France
- 27 October 2006-27 January 2007: «Boudha line», Galerie Stardom, Paris, France
- May 2007: «Hommage au Major», Galerie Stardom, Paris, France
- 19-20 June 2008: «Fou et Cavalier», Espace Cortambert, Paris, France
- 15 January-14 June 2009: «Blueberry», Maison de la bande dessinée, Brussels, Belgium
- 4 May-7 June 2009: «The Moebiusian World», International Manga Museum, Kyoto, Japan
- 27 November 2009: «Arzak, destination Tassili», Espace Cortambert, Paris, France
- 12 October 2010 – 13 March 2011: «Mœbius transe-forme», Fondation Cartier pour l'art contemporain, Paris, France
- 17 June–31 December 2011: «Mœbius multiple(s)», Musée Thomas-Henry, Cherbourg-Octeville, France

Posthumous exhibitions

- 15 September 2019–29 March 2020: «Mœbius: Surreale Comicwelten» exposition at the Max Ernst Museum Brühl des LVR, Brühl, Germany.
- 10 July 2021-4 October 2021: «Mœbius - Alla ricerca del tempo», Museo Archeologico Nazionale di Napoli (MANN), Naples, Italy
- 25 October 2021-6 December 2021: «Inferno, Purgatorio, Paradiso. Divine illustrazioni» (with Lorenzo Mattotti and Milton Glaser), Accademia di Belle Arti di Firenze, Florence, Italy

=== Stamps ===
In 1988 Giraud was chosen, among 11 other winners of the prestigious Grand Prix of the Angoulême Festival, to illustrate a postage stamp set issued on the theme of communication.

== Personal life ==
During his stint at Hachette, Giraud met Claudine Conin, an editorial researcher at Hachette, who described her future husband as being at the time "funny, uncomplicated, friendly", but also "mysterious, dark, intellectual", recognizing that he had all the makings of a "visionary" long before others did. Married in 1967, the couple had two children, Hélène (b:1970) and Julien (b:1972). Hélène has worked as a graphics artist in the animation industry, earning her a 2014 French civilian knighthood, the same her father had received in 1985. Claudine managed the business aspects of her husband's art work, and made occasional contributions as a colorist. The 1976 feminist fantasy short story, "La tarte aux pommes", was written by her under her maiden name. A character in Giraud's Blueberry series, Chihuahua Pearl, was in part based on Claudine's looks. The 1973 fantasy road trip short story "La déviation", created as "Gir" before the artist fully embarked on his Mœbius career, featured the Giraud family as the protagonists, save Julien.

Giraud met Isabelle Champeval during a book signing in Venice, Italy in 1984, and entered into a relationship with her in 1987, which resulted in the birth of second son Raphaël in 1989. Giraud's marriage with Claudine was legally ended in 1994. Exemplary of the marriage ending without any ill will was, that Claudine was still emphatically acknowledged for her contributions in the 1997 artbook "Blueberry's",. Giraud and Isabelle were married in 1995, and the union resulted in their second child, daughter Nausicaa, the same year. For Giraud his second marriage was of such great personal importance, that he henceforth considered his life divided in a pre-Isabelle part and a post-Isabelle part. Isabelle's sister, Claire, became a regular contributor as colorist on Giraud's latter-day work.

Giraud gave up smoking marijuana at 65, though not condemning it as Giraud considered it a gateway to a hidden dreamworld ever since he was introduced in 1974 to the writings of Carlos Castaneda. He had stopped looking for outside teachers - or "gurus" as he coined them - after his stay on Tahiti, instead continuing to seek deeper truths within himself on his own accord.

== Style ==
Giraud's working methods were various and adaptable ranging from etchings, white and black illustrations, to work in colour of the ligne claire genre and water colours. Giraud's solo Blueberry works were sometimes criticized by fans of the series because the artist dramatically changed the tone of the series as well as the graphic style. However, Blueberry's early success was also due to Giraud's innovations, as he did not content himself with following earlier styles, an important aspect of his development as an artist.

To distinguish between work by Giraud and Moebius, Giraud used a brush for his own work and a pen when he signed his work as Moebius. Giraud was known for being an astonishingly fast draftsman.

His style has been compared to the Nouveaux réalistes, exemplified in his turn from the bowdlerized realism of Hergé's Tintin towards a grittier style depicting sex, violence and moral bankruptcy.

In the documentary MetaMoebius (2010), Giraud claims his different styles may stem from his short-sightedness. When drawing without glasses he is more attuned to fine details but disconnected from the external world, but when drawing with glasses on he does not get into details but is more aware of the big picture. He often starts with glasses on to have a global perspective then later continues without glasses.

== Influence and legacy ==
They said that I changed their life, 'You changed my life', 'Your work is why I became an artist'. Oh, it makes me happy. But you know at same time I have an internal broom to clean it all up. It can be dangerous to believe it. Someone wrote, 'Moebius is a legendary artist' I[t] put[s] a frame around me. A legend — now I am like a unicorn.

— Giraud, Burbank, California, 2011, on the idolization accorded to him.

Long before his death Giraud had already been coined "the most influential bandes dessinées artist after Hergé" by several academic comic scholars, and many artists from around the world have cited him as a major influence on their work. Testament to this was the publication of two special homage issues of the French comic journals Casemate (Hors Série 3) and dBD (Hors Série 09) a month after Giraud's death. The original "Chihuaha Pearl" album-cover-endowed Casemate issue featured, aside from an elaborate in-memoriam overview of Giraud's life and career, testimonials from 89 predominantly European comic artists. For the dBD issue, which came in two cover variants, "Giraud, mort d'un géant" ("Giraud, death of a giant") and "Mœbius, Adieu à l'immortel" ("Mœbius: Farewell to an immortal"), over 100 comic artists, this time added with international overseas artists, contributed art as tribute to the deceased artist.

Testimonials

- Giraud was longtime friends with manga author and anime filmmaker Hayao Miyazaki. Giraud even named his daughter Nausicaa after the character in Miyazaki's Nausicaä of the Valley of the Wind. Asked by Giraud in an interview how he first discovered his work, Miyazaki replied,

"Through Arzach, which dates from 1975, I believe. I only read it in 1980, and it was a big shock. Not only for me. All manga authors were shaken by this work. Unfortunately, when I discovered it, I already had a consolidated style so I couldn't use its influence to enrich my drawing. Even today, I think it has an awesome sense of space. I directed Nausicaä under Mœbius's influence."

- Mike Mignola, creator of Hellboy, has stated upon seeing Arzach,

"I fell out of love with American comics, lost interest in the super-hero subject matter, was more interested in the fantasy I saw in the European art."

- Pioneering cyberpunk author William Gibson said of Giraud's "The Long Tomorrow" work,

"So it's entirely fair to say, and I've said it before, that the way Neuromancer-the-novel "looks" was influenced in large part by some of the artwork I saw in Heavy Metal. I assume that this must also be true of John Carpenter's Escape from New York, Ridley Scott's Blade Runner, and all other artefacts of the style sometimes dubbed 'cyberpunk'. Those French guys, they got their end in early."

- "The Long Tomorrow" was a key visual reference for Blade Runner. Having previously cooperated with the artist on his 1979 sci-fi thriller Alien, director Ridley Scott stated as late as 2010 on Mœbius' influence on contemporary science fiction movies,

"You see it everywhere, it runs through so much you can't get away from it."

- Comic artist, publisher and editor Stephen R. Bissette, responsible for the first-time publication of "Les yeux du chat" in English, had it recorded that,

"When I first saw the work of 'Mœbius' – a.k.a. 'Gir', both noms de plume of Jean Giraud – his fresh science-fiction and fantasy comic art forever altered my perception of the comic medium."

- George Lucas, who had invited Giraud to work with him on his 1988 fantasy movie Willow, wrote in the foreword of the 1989 "The Art of Mœbius" art book,

"In all his drawings, Mœbius demonstrates a command of many disciplines in art. He is a master draftsman, a superb artist, and more: his vision is original and strong. Since first seeing the Mœbius illustrations in Heavy Metal years ago, I have been impressed and affected by his keen and unusual sense of design, and the distinctive way in which he depicts the fantastic. perhaps what strikes me most of all his work is its sheer beauty–a beauty that has always given me great pleasure."

- British author and comic artist Neil Gaiman, with whom Giraud collaborated on Gaiman's The Sandman series, stated,

"I read [Métal Hurlant] over and over and envied the French because they had everything I dreamed of in comics – beautifully drawn, visionary and literate comics, for adults. I wanted to make comics like that when I grew up."

- "I consider him more important than Doré", said Italian filmmaker Federico Fellini, elaborating,

"He's a unique talent endowed with an extraordinary visionary imagination that's constantly renewed and never vulgar. Moebius disturbs and consoles. He has the ability to transport us into unknown worlds where we encounter unsettling characters. My admiration for him is total. I consider him a great artist, as great as Picasso and Matisse."

- Following Giraud's death, Brazilian author Paulo Coelho paid tribute on Twitter stating,

"The great Moebius died today, but the great Mœbius is still alive. Your body died today, your work is more alive than ever."

- Comic book editor, translator, and publisher Kim Thompson eulogized,

"I have said for years now — in fact, probably since 2000, when Charles Schulz left us, and there were four — that the three greatest living cartoonists are Robert Crumb, Jacques Tardi, and Jean Giraud. In the last 48 hours, that number has shrunk to two. – Salut, Jean!"

- Benoît Mouchart, artistic director at France's Angoulême International Comics Festival, made an assessment of his importance to the field of comics,

"France has lost one of its best known artists in the world. In Japan, Italy, in the United States he is an incredible star who influenced world comics. Mœbius will remain part of the history of drawing, in the same right as Dürer or Ingres. He was an incredible producer, he said he wanted to show what eyes do not always see."

- French Culture Minister Frédéric Mitterrand, speaking at his funeral services at Saint Clotilde Basilica on 15 March 2012, said that by the simultaneous death of Giraud and Mœbius, France had lost "two great artists". By both his presence and speech Mitterrand essentially cemented Giraud's status as France's premier standard bearer of "Le Neuvième Art" ("the 9th art"), the bande dessinée has officially become recognized as.

=== Awards and honors ===
- 1969 & 1970: Prix Phénix Paris (France), for Lieutenant Blueberry in the category "La Meilleure Serie d'Aventures".
- 1971: "Best European Artist" Prix Saint-Michel (Belgium, as Jean Giraud) from the city of Brussels.
- 1972: "Best Realistic Artist" Special Award from the National Cartoonists Society (USA) for Lieutenant Blueberry.
- 1973: Shazam Award (USA), for Lieutenant Blueberry in the category "Best Foreign Comic Series", shared with Jean-Michel Charlier.
- 1975: Yellow Kid Award, Lucca Comics & Games (Italy), in the category "Best Foreign Artist".
- 1976: "Grand Prix Saint-Michel" (Belgium, as Mœbius) from the city of Brussels for Arzach.
- 1977: Angoulême International Comics Festival (France) Best French Artist
- 1978: Goldene Sprechblase Award, Vereinigung für Comic-Literatur (Austria) for Leutnant Blueberry in the category "Besondere Verdienste um die Comic-Literatur".
- 1979: Adamson Award (Sweden), for Lieutenant Blueberry in the category "Best International Comic-Strip [or comic book] Cartoonist".
- 1980: Yellow Kid Award, Lucca Comics & Games (Italy), in the category "Best Foreign Author".
- 1980: Grand Prix de la Science Fiction Française, Special Prize, for Major Fatal.
- 1981: Grand Prix de la ville d'Angoulême (France), Angoulême International Comics Festival.
- 1982: Fantafestival Award (Italy) for Les Maîtres du temps in the category "Best Children's Film", shared with Director René Laloux.
- 1985: Angoulême "Grand Prix National des Arts Graphiques" (France).
- 1985: Dubbed Chevalier de l'Ordre des Arts et des Lettres, French civilian knighthood,
- 1986: Inkpot Award (USA)
- 1988: Harvey Award (USA), for Moebius album series by Marvel/Epic in the category "Best American Edition of Foreign Material".
- 1989: Eisner Award (USA), for Silver Surfer in the category "Best Finite Series".
- 1989: Harvey Award (USA), for Incal by Marvel/Epic in the category "Best American Edition of Foreign Material".
- 1989: Haxtur Award (Spain), Salón Internacional del Cómic del Principado de Asturias, Spain, for The Incal in the category "Best Drawings"
- 1990: Soleil d'Or of the Festival BD de Solliès-Ville (France) for Altor: "Le secret d'Aurelys", in the category "Best Children's Comic Album", shared with Marc Bati
- 1991: Eisner Award (USA), for Concrete in the category "Best Single Issue".
- 1991: Harvey Award (USA), for Lieutenant Blueberry by Marvel/Epic in the category "Best American Edition of Foreign Material".
- 1991: Haxtur Award (Spain), Salón Internacional del Cómic del Principado de Asturias, for La Diosa (The Goddess) in the category "Best Drawings".
- 1996: Soleil d'Or of the Festival BD de Solliès-Ville (France) for Blueberry: "Mister Blueberry", in the category "Best Comic Album"
- 1996: U Giancu's Prize, International Cartoonists Exhibition, Rappollo, Italy
- 1997: Designated finalist for induction into the Harvey Award Jack Kirby Hall of Fame (USA) in 1989, inducted in 1997.
- 1997: World Fantasy Award (USA) in the category "Best Artist".
- 1998: Induction into the Will Eisner Award Hall of Fame (USA).
- 1998: Premio Attilio Micheluzzi (Italy) for L'Incal lumière ("The Luminous Incal") in the "Miglior Fumetti" (=Best Comic) category
- 2000: Max & Moritz Prizes (Germany), Special Prize for outstanding life's work.
- 2000: Sproing Award (Norway) for Blueberry: "Geronimo" in the category "Best Translated Strips".
- 2001: Spectrum Grandmaster (USA)
- 2001: Haxtur Award (Spain), Salón Internacional del Cómic del Principado de Asturias, for The Crowned Heart, in the category "Best Long Comic Strip".
- 2003: Haxtur Award (Spain), Salón Internacional del Cómic del Principado de Asturias, in the category "Author That We Love".
- 2004: Albert-Uderzo Award (France) as "Mœbius" in the category "Life-time Achievement".
- 2009: Lauriers Verts de La Forêt des Livres - Prix BD (France) for Le Chasseur Déprime.
- 2011: Induction into the Science Fiction Hall of Fame (USA).
- 2011: Dubbed Chevalier de l'Ordre National du Mérite (France) for his contributions to French culture, French civilian knighthood; last honor received personally by artist in life. Received from Higher Education Minister of France Laurent Wauquiez on 24 November.
- 2011: Prix La Nuit du Livre (France – established in 2004 by a collective of Parisian bookstores) for the Mœbius transe forme art book in the "Bande Dessinée" category.

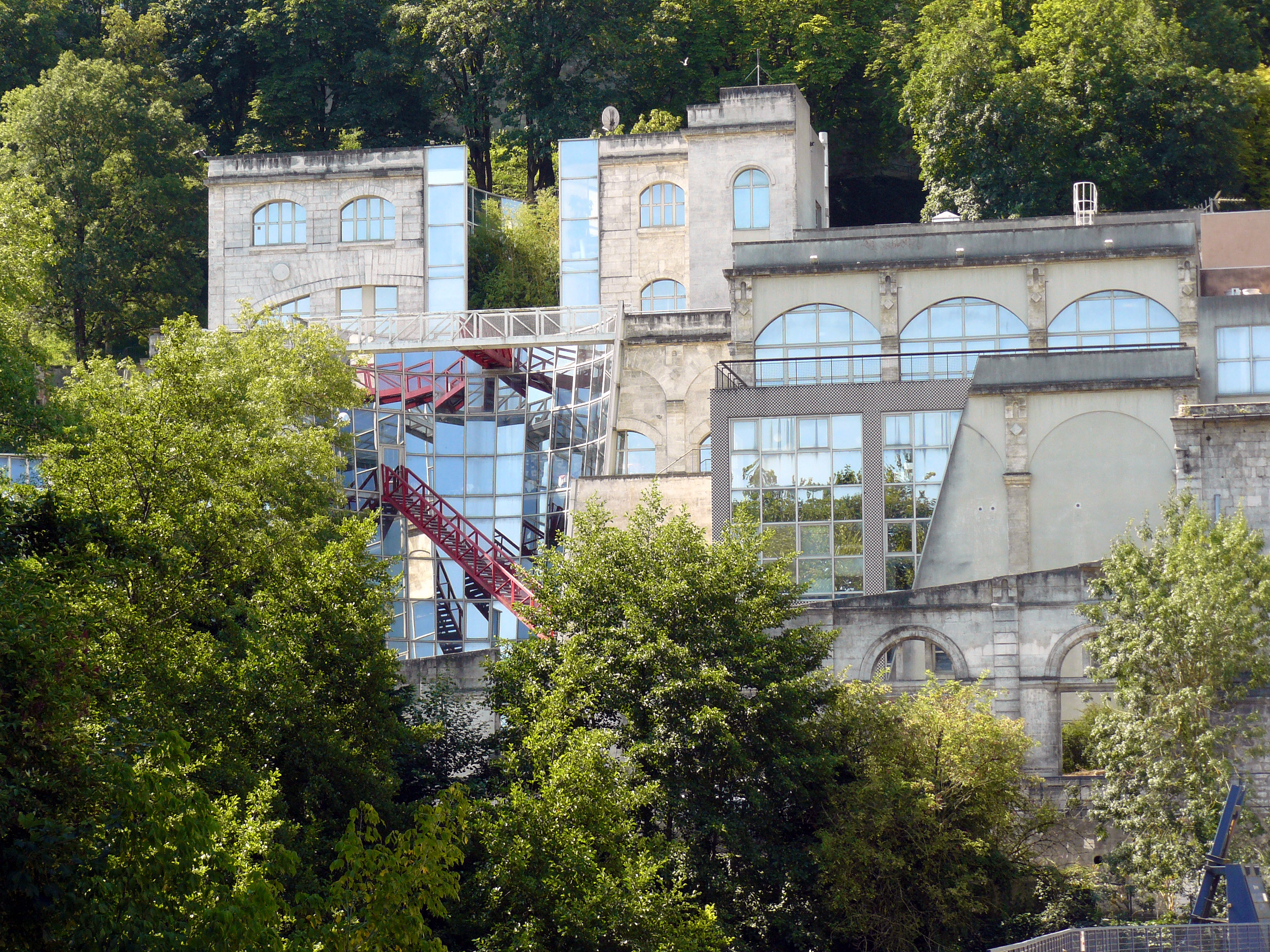
The "Vaisseau Mœbius" on the grounds of the Cité national comics museum, named for the nation's most revered bande dessinée artist

Posthumous awards and honors (usually accepted on behalf of the deceased artist by widow Isabelle Giraud)

- 2012: The Castro site on the grounds of the Cité internationale de la bande dessinée et de l'image, France's national comics museum, is rechristened "Le Vaisseau Mœbius" (English: "The Vessel Mœbius") on 11 December in honor of the deceased artist.
- 2014: Elevation from "Chevalier" to "Commandeur (french)" of the Ordre des Arts et des Lettres civilian knighthood, the highest rank of the order.
- 2017: Eisner Award (USA), for Moebius Library: The World of Edena in the category "Best U.S. Edition of International Material".
- 2018: Asteroid 109435 Giraud was named in his memory. The official naming citation was published by the Minor Planet Center on 25 September 2018 (M.P.C. 111801).
- 2020 Society of Illustrators Hall of Fame (USA).
- 2021 Inducted in the BD Gest' "Le Panthéon de la BD - Franco-Belge" hall of fame for his Moebius work only (France).

== Filmography ==
=== Feature-length, live-action films ===
- Alien (1979) - Concept artist
- Tusk (1980) - Film poster artwork
- Tron (1982) - Concept and storyboard artist
- Masters of the Universe (1987) - Concept artist participation
- Willow (1988) - Concept artist participation
- The Abyss (1989) - Concept artist participation
- The Fifth Element (1997) – Production designer

=== Animated films ===
- The Time Masters (1982) - Concept and storyboard artist; poster art and comic adaptation.
- Little Nemo: Adventures in Slumberland (1989) - Concept artist participation and story writer.
- Thru the Moebius Strip (2005) - Based on a story by Jean Giraud. Production designer and co-producer.
- Strange Frame (2012) - Art designer.

== Video games ==
- Video games on which Mœbius has participated
  - Fade to Black (1995, box cover art only).
  - Panzer Dragoon (1995, box cover art only).
  - Pilgrim: Faith as a Weapon (1997, concept art).
  - Seven Samurai 20XX (2004, character design).
  - Mœbius was chosen by Sony to design an arcade and bar called The Airtight Garage, one of the main attractions at the urbain entertainment centre Metreon in San Francisco, which opened in 1999. It included three original games: Quaternia, a first-person shooter networked between terminals and based on the concept of "junctors" from The Airtight Garage; a virtual reality bumper cars game about mining asteroids; and Hyperbowl, an obstacle course bowling game incorporating very little overtly Moebius imagery. The arcade was closed in 2007.
- Video games heavily inspired by Mœbius' art
  - Panzer Dragoon (1995)
  - Jet Set Radio Future (2002).
  - Gravity Rush (2012).
  - Bury Me, My Love : 2D adventure (2017).
  - Griftlands (2021).
  - Sable (2021).
  - Aquamarine (2022).
  - Rollerdrome : third-person shooter with rollerskating (2022).
  - Swordship : futuristic dodge'em up (2022).
  - Zeitgeist : awe-inspiring 3D platformer in an submerged ancient city (2022).
  - A Long Journey to an Uncertain End : thematic narrative adventure (2023)
  - Bomb Rush Cyberfunk : styled after Jet Set Radio Future (2023).
  - Mars First Logistics : physics and building sim set on Mars (2025).
  - Synergy : colony sim set on a fictional arid exoplanet (2025).
  - Rova : photography game with space-rover in alien worlds (2026).
  - Stormforge : survival game with fantasy influences (2026).

== Documentaries ==
- 1987: The Masters of Comic Book Art – Documentary by Ken Viola (60 min.)
- 1994: La Constellation Jodorowsky – Documentary by Louis Mouchet (88 min. and 52 min.)
  - French SECAM tape release in 1997 (OCLC 691953670)
  - British (OCLC 805082536), French (OCLC 883137959), Italian (OCLC 875154036) and Spanish (OCLC 804213318) 1-disc DVD releases in 2007
- 1994: Blueberry – Documentary by Christophe Heili (Cendranes Films for Canal+/TVCF, October, 27 min.)
- 1997: Jean [Gir]aud's - Documentary by Hervé Eparvier (Stardom, Paris, 22 min.). Documentary produced on the occasion of the September 1996 Blueberry exposition at Stardom Gallery.
  - French SECAM tape release in 1997 (ISBN 2908706024)
- 2000: Mister Gir & Mike S. Blueberry – Documentary by Damian Pettigrew. (Musée de la Bande dessinée d'Angoulême, 55 min.)
  - French SECAM tape release in 2000 (OCLC 812528584)
- 2005: The Visual Element - Special feature with Giraud and his friend and co-worker Jean-Claude Mézières discussing their production design work on the movie The Fifth Element (The Fifth Element - Ultimate Edition 2005 DVD; The Fifth Element 2015 4K Blu-ray, 18 min.)
- 2007: Moebius Redux: A Life in Pictures – Biographical documentary by Hasko Baumann (Germany, England, Finland: Arte, BBC, ZDF, YLE, AVRO, 68 min.)
  - Non-commercial, but licensed, Australian 1-disc DVD release in 2008 (OCLC 951516758)
  - German 2-disc DVD release in 2010, extended to 190 min. (OCLC 891515384)
- 2007: Jean Van Hamme, William Vance et Jean Giraud à l'Abbaye de l'Épau – Institutional documentary (FGBL Audiovisuel, 70 min.)
- 2010: Métamoebius – Autobiographical portrait co-written by Jean Giraud and directed by Damian Pettigrew for the 2010 retrospective held at the Fondation Cartier for Contemporary Art in Paris (Fondation Cartier, CinéCinéma, 72 min.)
  - French 1-disc DVD release in 2011 (OCLC 887535650), augmented with Pettigrew's 2000 Mister Gir & Mike S. Blueberry documentary.

== Sources ==
- Sadoul, Numa (1976). Mister Mœbius et Docteur Gir (in French). Paris: Éditions Albin Michel. p. 96. ISBN 2226002669.; cover by Tardi.
- de Bree, Kees; Frederiks, Hans (1982). Stripschrift special 4: Blueberry, Arzach, Majoor Fataal, John Difool, de kleurrijke helden van Giraud/Moebius (in Dutch). Zeist: Vonk. p. 100. OCLC 63463307.
- Hjorth-Jørgensen, Anders (1984). Giraud/Moebius – og Blueberrys lange march (in Danish). Odense: Stavnsager. p. 64. ISBN 8788455262.
- Collective (1986). L'univers de Gir (in French). Paris: Dargaud. p. 96. ISBN 2205029452.
- Sadoul, Numa (1991). Entretiens avec Mœbius (in French) (Updated, expanded and revised version of the 1976 Albin Michel ed.). Tournai: Casterman. p. 198. ISBN 2203380152.
- Ledoux, Alain; Maltret, Olivier (November 1993). "Gir-Moebius". Sapristi! (in French) (27). Dieppe: Association Normande de Bande Dessinée (ANBD).
- Giraud, Jean (1999). Moebius-Giraud: Histoire de mon double (in French). Paris: Editions 1. p. 220. ISBN 2226002669.
- Svane, Erik; Surmann, Martin; Ledoux, Alain; Jurgeit, Martin; Berner, Horst; Förster, Gerhard (2003). Zack-Dossier 1: Blueberry und der europäische Western-Comic (in German). Berlin: Mosaic. p. 96. ISBN 393266759X.; the majority of the featured artist's interviews, conducted by Svane, was originally published in French in the Swiss comic journal Swof, Hors-Séries (Moebius-themed) issue 2, 2000/Q1.
- Bosser, Frédéric (June 2005). "Jan Kounen: Du Colt 45 au 35 mm" & "Dossier Jean Giraud: Cavalier solitaire". Les dossiers de la bande dessinée (in French). No. 27. Paris: DBD. pp. 52–94.
- Sadoul, Numa (2015). Docteur Mœbius et Mister Gir (in French) (Updated, expanded and revised version of the 1991 Casterman ed.). Tournai: Casterman. p. 264. ISBN 9782203041639. (ISBN 9782203226326, May 2021 hardcover reprint)
- Sadoul, Numa; Gauvin (tr.), Edward (13 December 2023). Doctor Mœbius and Mister Gir (English language version of the 2015 Casterman ed.). Milwaukie, Oregon, USA: Dark Horse Books. p. 288. ISBN 9781506713434.
- Quillien, Christophe (2024). Jean Giraud alias Mœbius (in French). Paris, France: Éditions du Seuil. p. 592. ISBN 9782021477191.
