= The Long Tomorrow =

The Long Tomorrow may refer to:

- The Long Tomorrow (novel), a 1955 science fiction novel by Leigh Brackett
- The Long Tomorrow (comics), a 1976 science fiction comic written by Dan O'Bannon and illustrated by Moebius
