= Aquamarine (video game) =

2022 video game

- Developer: Moebial Studios
- Publisher: Hitcents
- Director: Patric Fallon
- Artist: Leonardo D'Almeida
- Composer: Thomas Hoey
- Platforms: Linux, macOS, Windows
- Release: January 20, 2022
- Genre: Adventure
- Mode: Single-player

Aquamarine is a turn based survival video game developed by the American developer Moebial Studios. It was released for Linux, macOS, and Windows in January 2022. The game is set in a vast alien ocean where the player character explores and learns more about the world.

== Gameplay ==
In Aquamarine, players take control of a space explorer who has crash landed on a small island on an alien planet. The player goes on underwater dives, using a pod to find resources. Using resources found from dives the player can upgrade their pod or invest in the island. The player can also find items or food to eat during dives. The game is turn based, every time the player makes a move, the player's energy bar goes down. If the bar reaches zero, the pod breaks and sends the player back to the island.

== Development ==
The game is inspired from the work of French artist Jean Giraud. The game started development in 2017. Moebial launched the Kickstarter for the game alongside a demo on October 3, 2018. The Kickstarter campaign was unsuccessful, with the game only reaching $9,590 of its $25,000 goal. In January 2020, Moebial launched a second Kickstarter with a reduced funding goal of $12,500. This campaign was successful, and the game had its release date postponed from late 2020 to Q2 2021. The game was delayed again and eventually launched in January 2022.
