= Silver Surfer: Parable =

1988 comic book limited series by Stan Lee and Moebius

Publication information
- Publisher: Marvel Comics
- Format: Limited series
- Publication date: 1988 – 1989
- No. of issues: 2
- Main character(s): Heroes: • Silver Surfer; Villains: • Galactus • Rev. Colton Candell

Creative team
- Written by: Stan Lee
- Artist: Mœbius
- Letterer: Mœbius
- Colorist(s): Mœbius; Mark Chiarello; John Wellington
- Editor(s): Archie Goodwin; Margaret Clark; Tom DeFalco; R. J. M. Lofficier; Jeff Youngquist

Silver Surfer: Parable is a two-issue comic book limited series published by Marvel Comics in 1988 and 1989. The story was written by Stan Lee and illustrated by legendary French bande dessinées (BD) artist Jean "Mœbius" Giraud. The series is an out-of-continuity story that explores themes of religious fanaticism and humanity's relationship with power and faith. It won the Eisner Award for Best Finite/Limited Series in 1989.

== Publication history ==
Silver Surfer: Parable was originally published as a two-issue mini-series through Marvel's Epic Comics imprint in 1988 and 1989. The collaboration came about after Mœbius expressed interest in working on an American comic, and Stan Lee provided a six-page plot outline from which Mœbius created the art, including the (partial) coloring and hand-lettering. According to Mœbius, this was his very first time working under the Marvel method instead of from a full script, and he, the Franco-Belgian BD artist, had admitted to being baffled by the fact that he already had a complete story synopsis on his desk only two days after he had met Stan Lee for the first time, having discussed what he had assumed was a mere proposition over lunch.

The two-issue comic book story was later collected into a single graphic novel edition several times over. In 2019 for example, a 30th Anniversary Oversized Edition was released by Marvel Comics. This edition, published in hardcover, features the main story in an oversize format (13.25 x 9.5 inches) and includes making-of material, extra Mœbius art, his Marvel covers, and a double-sided poster.

The series has also been reprinted in multiple languages and formats worldwide, including Dutch, French (Mœbius' native language), German, Italian, Portuguese, Spanish, and Turkish editions.

== Plot summary ==
=== Issue 1 ===
A massive spacecraft plummets to Earth, landing in a major city and causing global panic. The being that emerges is Galactus, who announces himself as a new god for humanity. He promises an end to war, poverty, and crime, declaring that humanity is free from all man-made laws and sin. This leads to widespread anarchy as society breaks down.

Meanwhile, the Silver Surfer has been living on Earth as a disillusioned vagrant, his surfboard wrapped and hidden. He observes the chaos and recognizes his former master, Galactus. A declining televangelist, Reverend Colton Candell, seizes the opportunity to regain relevance by proclaiming himself the prophet of Galactus. The Surfer confronts Candell, warning him of the danger, but is dismissed. Candell's sister, Elyna, however, is intrigued by the Surfer's courage.

The Surfer then confronts Galactus directly, reminding him of his past pledge not to harm Earth. Galactus argues that he has technically kept his oath; he has not attacked, but is merely allowing humanity to destroy itself. When the Surfer tries to reason with the people, they turn on him for challenging their new deity. Galactus joins the attack, blasting at the Surfer and causing massive destruction to the city.

=== Issue 2 ===
To prevent further destruction, the Silver Surfer retreats, but Galactus's ship finds him and brings him back to continue their battle. Elyna, realizing the error in following Galactus, attempts to intervene by piloting a helicopter to confront the world-eater. However, one of Candell's men shoots her, fatally wounding her.

As the Surfer and Galactus fight, Elyna's helicopter loses control. The Surfer breaks away to save her, but Galactus strikes him with a powerful blast, sending both the Surfer and Elyna crashing to the ground. Elyna dies from her injuries, and the event is broadcast worldwide. Witnessing Galactus's brutality, the global populace turns against him. Seeing that he has lost their worship, Galactus gracefully concedes, releases the Surfer, and departs Earth.

Later, at the United Nations, world leaders thank the Silver Surfer and, in a reversal, ask him to become their new leader and object of worship. Horrified that humanity is seeking another deity, the Surfer performs a Zero-Approval Gambit: he acts like a tyrant, making harsh demands to deliberately tarnish his own reputation. The crowd turns on him, and he leaves Earth, once again alone. Reverend Candell, having seen the error of his ways, is the only one who understands the Surfer's sacrifice, but his voice is drowned out by the angry mob.

== Themes and analysis ==
Parable is a philosophical story that delves into themes of religious fanaticism, blind faith, and the human desire for messianic figures. Stan Lee stated that his goal was for readers to "find themselves contemplating the destiny of man, and... questioning some basic tenets." The narrative contrasts Galactus as an Old Testament-style, fire-and-brimstone god with the Silver Surfer as a Christ-like, self-sacrificing figure who lives among the people as a pauper and rejects worship.

The story explores the idea that "power is all" and questions whether divinity is determined by unfeeling strength. It also examines how charismatic but manipulative leaders can sway the masses toward self-destruction. The ending is characteristically bittersweet for the Silver Surfer; he saves humanity but must remain an outcast, and his moral victory comes at the cost of an innocent life.

== Artistic style ==
Mœbius employed a minimalist, loose, and sketch-like art style for Parable, a departure from the typical Marvel house style of the time. He also hand-lettered the entire book, giving it a unique, energetic feel that complemented the art. His cinematic eye is evident in the book's sense of scale, with Galactus portrayed as an overwhelming, stationary presence for much of the first issue. Moebius was responsible for all visual aspects of the book, including pencils, inks, colors, and lettering.

== English releases ==
Apart from the original two-issue comic book, the series has also been collected into various (anthology) editions,

- The Silver Surfer, Part 1 (32 pages, Epic, December 1988); US standard comic book.
- The Silver Surfer, Part 2 (32 pages, Epic, January 1989); US standard comic book.
- The Silver Surfer (68 pages, Epic, December 1988, ISBN 0871354918); with new cover and editorial enhanced, limited deluxe hardcover anthology edition in dust jacket, though print run is unknown.
- The Silver Surfer: Parable (68 pages, Marvel, 1998/Q1, ISBN 0785106561); softcover trade paperback reissue.
- The Silver Surfer: Parable (168 pages, Marvel, May 2012, ISBN 9780785162094); hardcover trade edition, augmented with work from Keith Pollard, concurrently released as a numbered, limited to 640 copies, hardcover edition in dust jacket (ISBN 9780785162100).
- The Silver Surfer: Parable (88 pages, Marvel, July 2019, ISBN 9781302918743); hardcover "30th Anniversary Oversized Edition".
- The Silver Surfer: Parable (88 pages, Marvel, July 2020, ISBN 9781302923709); 30th anniversary softcover trade paperback reissue.
- Silver Surfer Epic Collection: Parable (504 pages, June 2022, Marvel, ISBN 9781302932329); trade paperback anthology collection by several artists, including the Mœbius creation.

== Reception and legacy ==
Silver Surfer: Parable was met with critical acclaim and won the Eisner Award for Best Finite/Limited Series in 1989. Stan Lee considered it one of his most favorite Silver Surfer stories that he had ever written. Reviewers have praised the book for its timeless and thought-provoking narrative, with its commentary on power and fanaticism remaining relevant decades after its publication.

The collaboration between two comic legends from different continents has been noted as a significant event in comics history. Exemplary of this was its reference in the 1995 submarine thriller Crimson Tide. In it, Mœbius' version was discussed by two sailors pitting his Silver Surfer version against Jack Kirby's with the main character, played by Denzel Washington, deeming the Kirby version the better of the two. Becoming aware of the reference around 1997, Giraud was later told around 2005 by the movie's director Tony Scott, that it was he who had written in the dialog as an homage to the artist on behalf of his brother Ridley, a fervent Mœbius admirer, and not (uncredited) script doctor Quentin Tarentino (known for infusing his works with pop culture references) as Giraud was initially, but mistakenly, led to believe. An amused Giraud later quipped, "It's better than a big stature, because in a way, I can not dream of anything better to be immortal [than] being in a movie about submarines!"

== See also ==
- Silver Surfer
- Stan Lee
- Moebius
- Galactus
- Epic Comics
