= Guy-Claude Burger =

French essayist (born 1934)

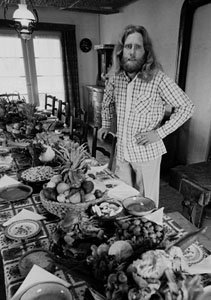
- Born: September 4, 1934 (age 91); Lausanne, Switzerland
- Occupations: Essayist; Cellist
- Known for: Instinct therapy
- Criminal charges: Fraud conviction, Illegal practice of medicine and Sexual abuse of a minor
- Criminal status: imprisoned

Guy-Claude Burger (French: [ɡi.klod byʁ.ʒɛʁ]) (born September 4, 1934), is a French essayist known for creating a dietary practice called instinct therapy which he exhibited in three separate works published between 1985 and 1990. He also espoused a theory of "metapsychoanalysis", described by the press as pedophilia apologia.

He came into conflict with the Swiss and French courts several times, cited in the French National Assembly's report Sects and Money, indicating that he had been convicted for fraud and the illegal practice of medicine in 1997. He was also sentenced for fifteen years in December 2001 for the "rape of a minor under fifteen years of age". He has since been classified by the press as a "pedophile guru."

According to forensic psychiatrist Jean-Marie Abgrall, who specialises in cults, Burger is "a great structural pervert" and "a very great manipulator." She also stated: "For Mr. Burger, removing the taboo of incest and pedophilia would result in a crime-free society. In other words, it is society that produces the crime. It is totally immoral which implies that a perfect society would accept pedophilia and incest."

== Biography ==
He played the cello for the Lausanne Conservatory and claimed to have a degree in physics and mathematics from the University of Lausanne.

In 1958, while in Vevey, he was given a one-year suspended sentence for indecent assault. In 1960 at age 26, he was diagnosed with pharyngeal cancer (lymphomatous sarcoma). He was treated with surgery and radiotherapy, the later being an influence on his development of instinct therapy. In 1964, he founded a company presenting itself as a food ecology center, naming it Éclépens. In 1978, he was sentenced to four years in prison in Switzerland for abusing his son and nine-year-old daughter by the court in Cossonay for indecent assault and "unnatural debauchery" of children. After his release, he departed for Mexico in 1981, describing it as an "escape" or "exile".

In 1984, he founded the Center of Instinct Therapy at Castle Montramé in Soisy-Bouy, southeast of Paris. In 1985, he wrote the book The Local War, Instinct Therapy. He was arrested for illegally practicing medicine in 1987 and was prohibited from returning to Montrame and practicing instinct therapy in France. After being released, he settled in Provins, close to Montramé. In April 1989, he appeared on the show Ciel, mon mardi ! hosted by Christophe Dechavanne.

In 1990, he published Instinct Therapy, Eating Real through Éditions du Rocher. In 1995, the International Federation for the Development of Instinctive Eating (FIDALI), founded by Guy-Claude Burger, was denounced as a sect by the report of the French Parliamentary Commission of Inquiry on the sects of 1995. In 1997, he was convicted again for illegally practicing medicine which was confirmed on appeal.

In December 2001, he was placed in "criminal imprisonment" for the "rape of a minor under fifteen years of age". His sentence was confirmed on appeal in 2003, then confirmed by the Court of Cassation, the highest court in France, in May 2004.

== Theories ==
=== Instinct therapy ===
Instinct therapy is a practice that emphasizes a raw food-diet based on Burger's hypothesis of incomplete genetic adaptation to changes undergone by human diet since prehistory. In practice, these meals consist of "original foods", i.e. raw and not seasoned or mixed, which is chosen according to variations in perceptions of smell, taste and repletion. Animal milks and some cereals are excluded.

Burger claims that this method can treat several illnesses, including cancer and AIDS. There are no current clinical studies on instinct theory.

=== Metapsychoanalysis ===
According to Burger's claims, the goal of human sexuality is not limited to reproduction and pleasure. He postulates that sexuality in accordance with instinct, without respect to "patterns dictated by society" (notably on adult-child relationships", this would help resolve many of society's issues and allow the development of extra-sensory faculties such as clairvoyance and telepathy. This is all developed under his theory "metapsychoanalysis". This theory has been described by news agencies as "an apology for pedophilia packed in pseudoscientific gibberish."

After having been convicted in Switzerland in 1978 for "indecent assault and unnatural practices on children," including his own son, he was again convicted in 2001 and was sentenced to fifteen years in prison for the "rape of a 15-year-old minor by a person in authority, corruption of minors and repeated death threats", which Burger has denied. His son was also prosecuted for sexual assault and abuse of minors.

During his trial, Burger explained his research into children's sexual instincts: "It is difficult for children to speak about their sexuality without experiencing it. Children have impulses, and I think we should let children come to the adult when they ask. I wanted to check if impulses were genetically programmed and what the purpose of their sexual instincts were."

== Publications ==
- La Guerre du cru, Roger Faloci edition, 1985, preface by Jean Devernoix de Bonnefon; republished by Orkos edition in 1988, preface by Jean Seignalet, ISBN 978-2-90672-200-2.
- Instinctotherapy, Eat True, Éditions du Rocher, 1990, ISBN 978-2-26800-931-5.
- Children of Crime or Deliquency Function, Orkos edition, 1990, ISBN 978-2-90672-202-6, 2-906-722-02-2.

== Bibliography ==
- Seven Years Under the Influence, testimony of Nicole Schneider, Éditions Mon Village, 2002, ISBN 2-88194-045-5.
