= Morgan Kane =

Fictional Western antihero created by Kjell Hallbing

Morgan Kane is a fictional western character and antihero, created by Kjell Hallbing under the pseudonym Louis Masterson.

The Morgan Kane series has become the biggest success in modern Norwegian leisure reading literature. The 83 books in the series have sold 11 million copies in Norway alone, in addition to having been published in ten other countries - totalling 20 million copies sold.

Since 2011, the Morgan Kane series has been available also in the shape of eBooks published by WR Entertainment.

The first book, Without Mercy, was published in 1966, and the series is currently on sale in its 15th print edition. The current print edition is published by Aller Forlag.

== Fictional character biography ==
Morgan Kane was born in 1855, somewhere along the Santa Fe Trail. His parents, Brendan and Gwen Cairn were Irish immigrants - they were killed by an Indian attack when Morgan was two weeks old.

Only 16 years old, Kane kills for the first time when he stabs Walsh, a drifter who contributed to the death of his parents. In 1874, he became a scout for the cavalry and fought in the Indian wars. He left the Army and tried prospecting for gold in South Dakota without much luck and he enlisted in the cavalry again, serving under General Custer. He fought in the Battle of the Little Bighorn, where General Custer was killed. Soon after the Sioux victory at Little Big Horn, Kane left the cavalry and became a gunslinger, riding with Billy the Kid and his gang of outlaws. Leaving the gang Kane maintained himself as a bounty hunter.

By the end of the 1870s, Kane used the nickname "El Gringo" as a gunfighter in the Arizona, New Mexico and Sonora, Mexico territories, where he joined up with a gang controlled by "El Coyote". After a battle with El Coyote, he left the gang and in 1881 was recruited by the Texas Rangers. He joined the Texas Rangers, and in 1882, he met his future wife, Linda Swift. He was subsequently appointed a U.S. Marshal.

After meeting Linda Swift again while on a mission, Kane eventually married her. He turned in his U.S. Marshal star and settled down to raise horses on his own ranch.

After two years of marriage, Linda was murdered, and Kane set out to find his wife's killers. He returned to serve as a U.S. Marshal, fighting many historic gunslingers including the Clanton, Johnny Ringo, Dalton Brothers, Marion Hedgepeth, John Wesley Hardin, The Wild Bunch, Sam Carey and Tom Horn. However soon Kane's superiors worried about his use of extreme violence, his excessive consumption of alcohol and at times, his mental disturbance, and his uncontrolled rage. By the close of the 1890s, he was transferred to Alaska, and was later fired.

After being fired, Kane traveled the U.S., having many different jobs, including a job as a special agent and bodyguard for Theodore Roosevelt. Kane was also involved in the invasion of Cuba. After that Kane is set to hunt for The Wild Bunch and ends up collaborating with Butch Cassidy and Sundance Kid instead of arresting them. Kane's health began to decline, and in 1910 he supported and fought with Pancho Villa during the Mexican Civil War. It was here that he met his unknown son, "Diablito", Paco Galàn. Together they traveled to Europe where Diablito became a famous matador. Later, Kane traveled back to America, where he was again reinstated as a U.S. Marshal.

In the last book Louis Masterson wrote, Kane was shot and killed by enemies in a deserted city on the Mexican border, facing overwhelming odds.

=== Characteristics ===
The books depict Morgan Kane as a womanizing character with sociopathic tendencies, with a star-shaped scar and damage to tendons which has paralyzed the ringfinger on his gun hand. The paralyzed finger is fixed to his middle finger with a leather strap.

- Born: Autumn 1855, somewhere along the Santa Fe Trail
- Height: 6 feet 3-4 inches (192 cm)
- Weight: About 165 pounds (75 kg)
- Hair: Dark, a white streak of dead hair on right temple
- Eyes: Smoke grey
- His clothing emphasizes function and practicality before style or image. In town, he prefers dark suits with long jackets, covering his gun holster.
- Handsome with distinct features
- Unshaven and suntanned
- Wears a single gun holster
- Draws his gun in 0.4 seconds (two-fifths of a second)
- Weaknesses: women, alcohol and gambling
- Weapons: Numerous, including the Colt Paterson, Walker Colt, .45 Colt Peacemaker, Smith & Wesson No. 3 Revolver, 1873 Winchester rifle and Krag–Jørgensen rifle.

== Books ==
=== English language print books ===
These books were published by English publisher Corgi starting in 1971:

1. Without Mercy
2. The Claw of the Dragon
3. The Star and the Gun
4. Backed by the Law
5. A Ranger's Honor
6. Marshal and Murderer
7. Pistolero
8. The Monster from Yuma
9. The Devil's Marshal
10. Gunman's Inheritance
11. Revenge
12. Storm over Sonora
13. The Law of the Jungle
14. No Tears for Morgan Kane
15. Between Life and Death
16. Return to Action
17. Rio Grande
18. Bravado
19. The Gallows Express
20. Ransom
21. The Butcher from Guerrero
22. Killing for the Law
23. Duel in Tombstone
24. To the Death, Senor Kane!
25. Hell Below Zero
26. Coyoteros
27. The Day of Death
28. Bloody Earth
29. New Orleans Gamble
30. Apache Breakout
31. Blood and Gold
32. Southern Showdown
33. Bell of Death
34. The Demon from Nicaragua
35. Revenging Angels
36. The Vultures of Sierra Madre
37. Dead Man's Shadow
38. El Gringo
39. El Gringo's Revenge
40. Harder Than Steel
41. Killer Kane

=== eBooks ===
1. El Gringo
2. El Gringo's Revenge
3. Without Mercy
4. The Claw of the Dragon
5. The Star and the Gun
6. Backed by the Law
7. A Ranger's Honor
8. Marshal and Murderer
9. Pistolero
10. The Monster from Yuma
11. The Devil's Marshal
12. Gunman's Inheritance
13. Revenge
14. Storm over Sonora
15. The Law of the Jungle

The book series has been made available as eBooks since 2011 by publishing house WR Entertainment.

Within three weeks of release, the first three ebooks held the top three best sellers on iTunes in Norway. Aftenposten's headline, "Morgan Kane makes comeback as best-seller", reported that books were being published in both English and Norwegian, with a new book being released every 2–4 weeks.

== Film adaptation ==
In 2011 WR Entertainment acquired worldwide screen rights to adapt the Morgan Kane story for film. In 2016, it was announced Mark Huffam was attached to the film as producer.
