= Kjell Hallbing =

Norwegian writer (1934–2004)

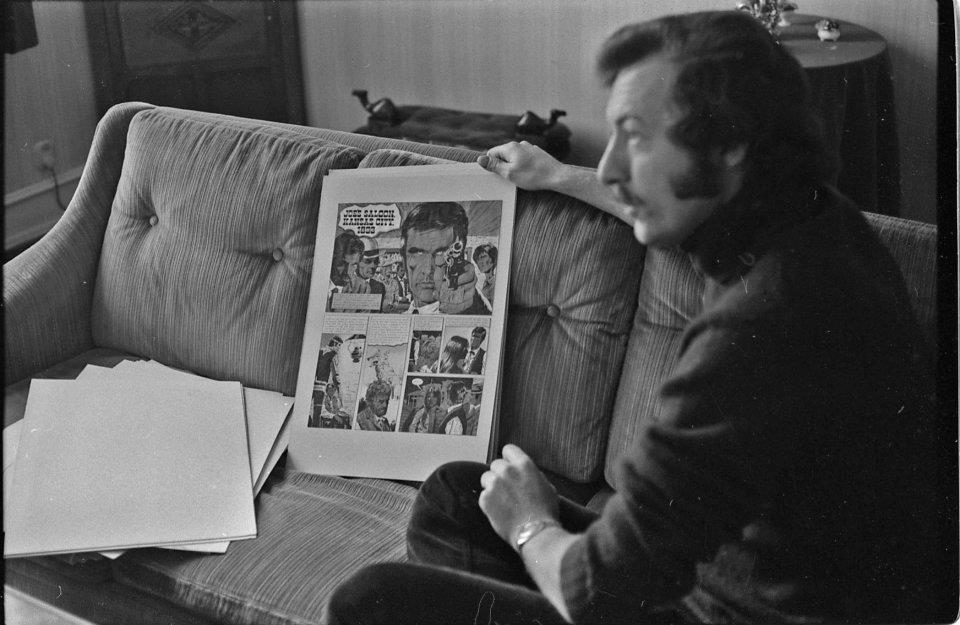
- Hallbing in 1973
- Born: 5 November 1934; Bærum, Akershus, Norway
- Died: 6 May 2004 (aged 69); Tønsberg, Norway
- Occupation: Author
- Writing career
- Pen name: Louis Masterson
- Genre: Western

Kjell Hallbing (5 November 1934, in Bærum – 6 May 2004, in Tønsberg) was a Norwegian author of Western books.

Under the pseudonym Louis Masterson, he wrote a series of books about the fictitious Texas Ranger (and later U.S. Marshal) Morgan Kane during 1966–1978. The 83 Morgan Kane books have sold more than 20 million copies worldwide. He has also written another nine-book series known as the Diablo- and Diablito books. Earlier in his career Hallbing used the pseudonyms Ward Cameron, Leo Manning, Lee Morgan and Colin Hawkins. His debut, Ubåt-kontakt, was released in 1961, written under his real name. The same year he released his first book set in the old West, Portrett av en revolvermann ("Portrait of a Gunslinger"). In addition Kjell Hallbing was an avid weapons collector, resulting in his collection being one of the largest privately owned weapons collections in Norway at the time of his death. He also owned a little house at Bolkesjø, where he actually wrote most of the books in the Morgan Kane series.

Other "heroes" Hallbing/Masterson wrote about included Jesse Rawlins, Owen Metzgar and Clay Allison.

There were plans to base a movie on Masterson's books El Gringo and El Gringo's Revenge, but they never materialized.

Before he started to write full-time in 1969, Hallbing worked as a bank employee. He is buried at Oslo Western Civil Cemetery.
