= The Long Tomorrow (comics) =

Science fiction comic story by Dan O'Bannon

"The Long Tomorrow" is the title of a science fiction comics short story serialized in two segments in the French magazine Métal Hurlant in 1976. It was written by American screenwriter Dan O'Bannon and illustrated by French artist Moebius.

It is noted for its influential visual design, which inspired the designs of feature films including Alien (1979), Blade Runner (1982), Tron (1982), and The Abyss (1989).

The story was reprinted in Moebius Book Four.

== History ==
In 1976, the original French language version of "The Long Tomorrow" (albeit with an English title) was serialized in two segments over two issues of the French magazine Métal Hurlant:

- Part 1 — Métal Hurlant #7 (May 1976)
- Part 2 — Métal Hurlant #8 (July 1976)

The following year, in 1977, an English translation was published over two issues of the American magazine Heavy Metal:

- Part 1 — Heavy Metal Vol. 1 No. 4 (July 1977)
- Part 2 — Heavy Metal Vol. 1 No. 5 (August 1977)

In 1987, Marvel Comics published "The Long Tomorrow" under their Epic Comics imprint.

== Background ==
In his introduction to the French hardcover graphic story collection The Long Tomorrow, Moebius wrote:

I drew 'The Long Tomorrow' in 1975, while I worked with Alexandro Jodorowsky on a film adaption of Dune. Originally Douglas Trumbull was to do the special effects, but that was not to be so Jodorowsky hired Dan O’Bannon to replace him. Dan came to Paris. Bearded, dressed in a wild style, the typical Californian post-hippie. His real work would begin at the time of shooting, on the models, on the hardware props. As we were still in the stage of preparations and concepts, there was almost nothing to do and he was bored stiff. To kill time, he drew. Dan is best known as a script writer, but is an excellent cartoonist. If he had wished, he could have been a professional graphic artist. One day, he showed me what he was drawing. It was the story board of 'The Long Tomorrow'. A classic police story, but situated in the future. I was enthusiastic. When Europeans try this kind of parody, it is never entirely satisfactory, the French are too French, the Italians are too Italian … so, under my nose was a pastiche that was more original than the originals. A believer in parody, Dan continued that tradition. As the story was very strong, I immediately asked if he would allow me to play around graphically, with complete freedom, without conventional pyrotechnics, to refocus on the floating point of view. Pete Club’s costume, for example, was almost ridiculous, far from the traditional raincoat of Bogart. It was the same for most of the visual elements. I scrupulously followed Dan’s story. One day I wish we could publish our two versions side by side. As the strip has pleased everyone, I asked Dan about a sequel, but it did not get his attention, so was simply an adventure I never designed.

The storytelling of "The Long Tomorrow" is inspired by film noir and hardboiled crime fiction, but the story is set in a distant, science fiction future, making it one of the first true cyberpunk stories.

== Influence ==
Pioneering cyberpunk author William Gibson said of "The Long Tomorrow":

"So it's entirely fair to say, and I've said it before, that the way Neuromancer-the-novel 'looks' was influenced in large part by some of the artwork I saw in Heavy Metal. I assume that this must also be true of John Carpenter's Escape from New York, Ridley Scott's Blade Runner, and all other artifacts of the style sometimes dubbed 'cyberpunk'. Those French guys, they got their end in early."

The comic's artwork was influential on the concept designs used in subsequent science fiction works, including the film Alien (1979), the film Blade Runner (1982), and the film The Abyss (1989).

The Long Tomorrow was loosely adapted as the "Harry Canyon" segment of the animated anthology film Heavy Metal (1981).
