= Raphaël Gesqua =

French composer, arranger and sound designer

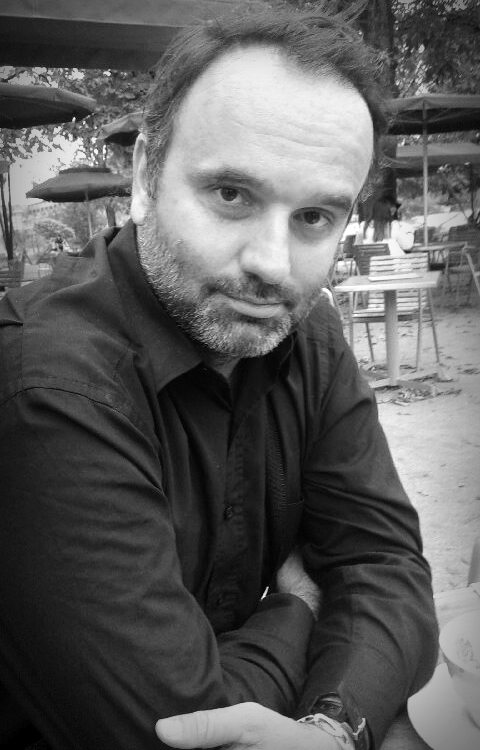

Background information
- Also known as: Audiomonster
- Born: 11 February 1972 (age 54); Paris, France
- Origin: France
- Genres: Video game music; Film score
- Occupations: Composer; Arranger; Sound designer
- Years active: 1989–present

Raphaël Gesqua (born February 11, 1972, in Paris) is a French composer, arranger and sound designer.

== Biography ==
Raphaël Gesqua's professional career began in the video games industry in the early 1990s under his real name, after he was previously known in the Amiga demoscene, under the handle Audiomonster, adopted in 1989.

Guesqua worked with Paul Cuisset, for whom he arranged the soundtrack of the video game Flashback, for the Amiga, in 1992.

He also worked twice with Pierre Adane, creator, among other things, of the Top Spin video games series, and for which he composed the soundtracks of Snow Bros video game, for Amiga, in 1991 (that production was cancelled for at the last minute for legal reasons), and in 1993, for Mr. Nutz, a side-scrolling platformer released for Super NES, Mega Drive/Genesis and Game Boy.

Collaboration with Paul Cuisset continued, and Gesqua composed and arranged the music for Shaq-Fu, Fade to Black, and Moto Racer, as a sound director of company Delphine Software International. Fade to Black and Moto Racer also got, in addition to their music, their sound effects entirely made by Gesqua.

After the Delphine Software period, Gesqua resumed his status as an independent composer, and created the original music, sound effects, and voices for various titles, like Marvel Super Heroes 3D, Code Lyoko, Horse Life, the DodoGo! series, Pop Island, the Cocoto series, and many other titles.

The Pop Island soundtrack (Odenis Studio) earned him a nomination for Milthon 2009 awards, for best soundtrack.

He also composed the music for Glory Days and Glory Days 2, for which he won two nominations on the IGN site, in 2007, for best soundtrack, facing The Legend of Zelda: Phantom Hourglass.

From 2003, Gesqua began his career in movies, and met then worked with several directors, such as Fabrice Blin, Thomas Lesourd, Christophe Monier, and Julien Maury. He then composed the soundtrack for the first film of the duo, Inside.

This first experience resulted in a failure, producers rejected Gesqua's work.

The second collaboration was a better one, and in 2011, Gesqua signed his first soundtrack for a feature film, with the film Livid, produced by La Fabrique 2, and released in theaters in France, on December 7, 2011. A double CD limited edition of the soundtrack was released by Kronos Records in 2017.

In 2013, Gesqua worked again with director Fabrice Blin, for his film documentary Super 8 Madness, about the genesis of Super 8 horror films in France.

Gesqua also signed, at the beginning of 2013, the soundtrack of a new English video game license, NimNims from Mickim Games.

In 2014, Gesqua worked again, with directors Julien Maury and Alexandre Bustillo, on their film Among the Living. The critical reception for the film's music was excellent, in the United States first, through the SXSW Austin, Texas, where the film was rated in the top 10 of the event by Fangoria, and frequently praised by music critics who attended the screening. Parallel to the film's release, a digital and CD version of the soundtrack was released by publishers MovieScore Media and Kronos Records.

The music of Among the Living obtained a nomination, in 2015, at "Soundtrack Geeks Awards", in the category "Best Horror Film Music of 2014".

In 2014, Gesqua composed the soundtrack for US films anthology The ABCs of Death 2 ("X is for Xylophone" segment), directed by Julien Maury and Alexandre Bustillo.

In 2015, Gesqua worked again with Christophe Monier, to compose the music of his feature film That Blood That Will Flow.

In 2017, the music of the feature film Livid, by Julien Maury and Alexandre Bustillo, is published in limited double CD edition, by Kronos Records. Still in 2017, Gesqua also composed the soundtrack for Kirby at War (La Guerre de Kirby), directed by Marc Azéma and Jean Depelley, for France Télévisions.

Gesqua also worked on the music for the virtual reality videogame Neon Seoul Outrun.

Lastly, Gesqua worked again with Christophe Monier for his latest film A Grenade under the Shirt (Une Grenade sous la Chemise), produced by Terra Cinema, and for which he won best music prize at Crash Test film festival 2020, among 3 other prizes for the film.

Also in 2018, the composer is hired by the company Microïds to re-orchestrate and compose new novel themes for the remake of the video game Toki, and to realize the sound design of the game.

Finally, in 2018, Gesqua was named "Member of honor" by the MO5.COM association, as a video game world personality supporting their initiative.

In 2019, Gesqua was hired by the company Color Dreams Productions to compose the music of The Red Spider, directed by Frank Florino.

In 2020, Gesqua composed the music for the feature film The Thing Behind the Door, aka La Chose Derrière la Porte, directed by Fabrice Blin, as well as for Première ligne, another feature film, this time directed by Francis Renaud.

Also in 2020, Gesqua returned to the documentary world to compose the music for Jack Kirby, the D-Day, a sequel to Kirby at War, still directed by Marc Azéma and Jean Depelley. The same year, he reunited with Julien Maury and Alexandre Bustillo, to compose the music for their feature film The Deep House.

In 2021, Gesqua composed the music for the video game Asterix and Obelix: Slap them all!, for which he also produced the sound design and some voices.

During the year 2022, Gesqua composed and re-arranged the music for the video game New Joe & Mac, for which he also produced the sound design and the voices.

The same year, he reunited with Paul Cuisset after 25 years, to compose the music for the video game Flashback 2.

== Discography ==
- 2017: Livid original film soundtrack ("Kronos Records")
- 2014: Among the Living original film soundtrack (MovieScore Media / "Kronos Records")
- 1996: Fade to Black original video game soundtrack (Sony Music - Delphine Records)
- 1996: Mega Video Game Music (videogames CD music compilation featuring Fade to Black and Mr. Nutz)

== Films ==
=== Feature films ===
- 2006: Inside, directed by Julien Maury and Alexandre Bustillo, produced by La Fabrique de Films (rejected by producers)
- 2011: Livid, directed by Julien Maury and Alexandre Bustillo, produced by La Fabrique 2
- 2013: Super 8 Madness, directed by Fabrice Blin & Vincent Leyour, produced by Metaluna Productions
- 2014: Among the Living, directed by Julien Maury and Alexandre Bustillo, produced by Metaluna Productions
- 2014: The ABCs of Death 2 - ("X is for Xylophone" segment), directed by Julien Maury and Alexandre Bustillo, produced by Metaluna Productions
- 2015: That Blood Which Will Flow / Ce Sang Qui Va Couler, directed by Christophe Monier, produced by Les Sentinelles Eternelles
- 2019: The Red Spider, directed by Frank Florino, produced by Color Dreams Productions
- 2020: Première ligne, directed by Francis Renaud, produced by Francis Renaud
- 2021: The Deep House (The Deep House), directed by Julien Maury and Alexandre Bustillo, produced by Radar Films
- 2023: The Thing behind the Door / La Chose derrière la Porte, directed by Fabrice Blin, produced by Phase 4 Productions
- 2024: The Soul Eater, directed by Julien Maury and Alexandre Bustillo, produced by Phase 4 Productions

=== Short films ===
- 2003: Pizza Hunt / Pizza à l'oeil, directed by Julien Maury, produced by M Corporation
- 2005: Pedro, directed by Julien Maury, produced by Julien & François Maury
- 2005: Lifeline / Ligne de Vie, directed by Bruno Marion, produced by Codicentre
- 2005: Forbidden Territory / Territoire Interdit, directed by Christophe Monier, produced by Les Films du Coq
- 2007: AEDEA, directed by Manuel Garcia Pou
- 2007: Mister Evil / Monsieur Méchant, directed by Fabrice Blin, produced by CWL Group
- 2008: Fake Leader Price TV spot / Fausse Publicité Leader Price, directed by Kevin Lecomte
- 2008: When Mommy is Gone / Quand Maman sera partie, directed by Christophe Monier, produced by Takami Productions/Arte
- 2009: The Blue Fighters / Les Combattants Bleus, directed by Christophe Monier, produced by Les Sentinelles Eternelles
- 2010: Mandragore, directed by Fabrice Blin, produced by Metaluna Productions
- 2018: A Grenade under the Shirt, directed by Christophe Monier, produced by Terra Cinema

=== Series ===
- 2007: Howard - Tome 1, created by Thomas Lesourd, produced by Les Films du Cartel & Thomas Lesourd
- 2008: Howard - Tome 2, created by Thomas Lesourd, produced by Les Films du Cartel & Thomas Lesourd

== Video games ==
- 1989–1994: Music composer for the Amiga demoscene under the handle of Audiomonster.
- 1991: Snow Bros (cancelled) (Amiga)
- 1992: Flashback (Amiga)
- 1993: Jimmy's Fantastic Journey (Amiga)
- 1993: Mr. Nutz (Super NES)
- 1994: Shaq-Fu (Super NES)
- 1994: Shaq-Fu (Mega Drive/Genesis)
- 1994: Mr. Nutz (Mega Drive/Genesis)
- 1994: Mr. Nutz (Game Boy)
- 1995: Fade to Black (PC CD-ROM)
- 1995: Shaq-Fu (Amiga)
- 1995: Shaq-Fu (Game Gear)
- 1996: Fade to Black (PlayStation)
- 1996: Mega Video Game Music (Music compilation)
- 1996: Fade to Black (Original videogame CD soundtrack)
- 1997: Moto Racer (PC CD-ROM)
- 1997: Moto Racer (PlayStation)
- 1998: Moto Racer 2 (PlayStation, PC CD-ROM - Sound effects and Delphine logo music only)
- 1999: Mr. Nutz (Game Boy Color)
- 1999: Darkstone: Evil Reigns (PC CD-ROM - Delphine logo music only)
- 1999: Paperland Cousteau (unreleased) (PC CD-ROM)
- 2000: Moto Racer World Tour (PlayStation - Sound effects and Delphine logo music only)
- 2001: Planet of the Apes (PC CD-ROM)
- 2001: Moto Racer 3 (PC CD-ROM - Delphine logo music only)
- 2001: H2Overdrive (unreleased) (PlayStation 2)
- 2001: Dark Stone - Evil Reigns (PlayStation - Delphine logo music only)
- 2001: Trackdown (unreleased) (PC CD-ROM, Xbox)
- 2001: Scape (unreleased) (PC CD-ROM, Dreamcast)
- 2002: Cars’n’Girls (unreleased) (PlayStation 2, PC CD-ROM)
- 2002: Planet of the Apes (PlayStation)
- 2002: Taxi 3 (PC CD-ROM)
- 2002: Sharp Shooter (PC CD-ROM)
- 2003: Cocoto Platform Jumper (PlayStation 2)
- 2004: Mouse Trophy (PlayStation 2, PC CD-ROM)
- 2004: Cocoto Platform Jumper (Nintendo GameCube)
- 2004: Cocoto Kart Racer (PlayStation 2)
- 2004: Cocoto Kart Racer (Nintendo GameCube)
- 2005: Rebel Raiders - Operation Nighthawk (PC CD-ROM)
- 2005: Rebel Raiders - Operation Nighthawk (PlayStation 2)
- 2005: Fastlane Carnage (PC CD-ROM)
- 2005: Cocoto Funfair (PlayStation 2, PC CD-ROM)
- 2005: Crazy Frog Racer (PlayStation 2, PC CD-ROM)
- 2005: Cocoto Funfair (GameCube)
- 2005: Franklin - A Birthday Surprise (PlayStation 2)
- 2005: Glory Days (Game Boy Advance)
- 2005: Franklin - A Birthday Surprise (Nintendo GameCube)
- 2005: Super Army War (Game Boy Advance)
- 2005: Franklin's Great Adventures (Nintendo DS)
- 2005: Cocoto Kart Racer (Nintendo DS)
- 2005: Franklin's Great Adventures (Game Boy Advance)
- 2006: Crazy Frog Racer 2 (PlayStation 2, PC CD-ROM)
- 2006: Cocoto Fishing Master (PlayStation 2)
- 2006: Postman Pat and the Greendale Rocket (Game Boy Advance)
- 2006: Legend of the Dragon (PlayStation 2)
- 2006: Legend of the Dragon (PlayStation Portable)
- 2006: Legend of the Dragon (Wii)
- 2006: Minna de Wai Wai Kokoto Kart (Nintendo DS)
- 2006: Noddy and the Magic Book (PlayStation 2)
- 2006: Heracles Battle with the Gods (PlayStation 2)
- 2006: Heracles Battle with the Gods (PC CD-ROM)
- 2006: Heracles Battle with the Gods (Nintendo DS)
- 2006: Cocoto Kart Racer (Game Boy Advance)
- 2006: Arthur and the Invisibles (Nintendo DS)
- 2007: Code Lyoko - Quest for Infinity (Nintendo Wii)
- 2007: Cocoto Platform Jumper (Game Boy Advance)
- 2007: Heracles Chariot racing (PlayStation 2)
- 2007: Cocoto Racers (Nintendo DS)
- 2007: Cocoto Magic Circus (Wii)
- 2007: Bratz Ponyz (Nintendo DS)
- 2007: Cocoto Kart Racer (PC CD-ROM)
- 2007: Glory Days 2 (Nintendo DS)
- 2008: Fade to Black (PlayStation 3)
- 2008: Rebel Raiders - Operation Nighthawk (Wii)
- 2008: Ellen Whitaker's Horse Life (Wii)
- 2008: Code Lyoko - Fall of Xana (Nintendo DS)
- 2008: Bratz Ponyz 2 (Nintendo DS)
- 2008: Ellen Whitaker's Horse Life (PC CD-ROM)
- 2008: Touch Mechanic (Nintendo DS)
- 2008: Cocoto Kart Racer (Wii)
- 2008: Horse Life - Amis pour la vie (PC CD-ROM)
- 2008: Code Lyoko - Quest for Infinity (PlayStation 2)
- 2008: Glory Days - Attack Hero (Nintendo DSi)
- 2008: Code Lyoko - Quest for Infinity (PlayStation Portable)
- 2008: Horse Life - Amis pour la vie (Wii)
- 2008: Cocoto Fishing Master (Wii)
- 2009: Faceez (Nintendo DSi)
- 2009: Cocoto Platform Jumper" (Wii)
- 2009: Pop Island (Nintendo DSi)
- 2009: Cocoto Festival (Wii)
- 2009: Kick Party (Wii)
- 2009: Cocoto Surprise (Wii)
- 2009: Heracles Chariot Racing (Wii)
- 2009: Heracles Chariot Racing (PlayStation Portable)
- 2009: Cocoto Kart Online (iPhone)
- 2010: Horse Life Adventures (Wii)
- 2010: Cocoto Kart HD Online! (iPad)
- 2010: DodoGo! (Nintendo DSi)
- 2010: Cocoto Magic Circus (iPhone)
- 2010: DodoGo! Challenge (Nintendo DSi)
- 2010: Cocoto Magic Circus HD Online (iPad)
- 2010: Western Heroes (Wii)
- 2010: Pop Island - Paperfield (Nintendo DSi)
- 2010: Marvel Super Heroes 3D - Grandmaster Challenge (Wii)
- 2011: Hidden Path of Faery (PC)
- 2011: Rising Board (iPhone)
- 2011: Gunslingers (Wii)
- 2011: Glory Days - Tactical Defense (Nintendo DSi)
- 2011: DodoGo! Robo (Nintendo DSi)
- 2011: Cocoto Kart Racer 2 (Nintendo Wii)
- 2012: Horses 3D (Nintendo 3DS)
- 2012: Rising Board 3D (Nintendo 3DS)
- 2013: Hidden Path of Faery (iPad)
- 2014: Fish & Sharks (iOS)
- 2015: NimNims (iOS, Android, OSX, Windows)
- 2017: Neon Seoul Outrun (Steam)
- 2018: Toki (Nintendo Switch)
- 2021: Asterix & Obelix: Slap them All! (PS4, Xbox One, Nintendo Switch, Steam)
- 2022: New Joe & Mac (PS5, PS4, Xbox One, Xbox Series, Nintendo Switch, PC)
- 2023: Flashback 2 (PS5, PS4, Xbox One, Xbox Series, Nintendo Switch, PC)

== Awards and nominations ==
- Raphaël Gesqua's first nomination on IGN awards (Best Original Music category)
- Raphaël Gesqua's second nomination on IGN awards (Best Use of Sound category)
- Raphaël Gesqua's nomination at Milthon 2009 awards (Best Original Soundtrack category)
- Raphaël Gesqua's nomination at Soundtrack Geek Awards 2015 (Best Horror Film Score category)
- Raphaël Gesqua's best music prize at Crash Test film festival 2020 (Best Original Music category)
- Raphaël Gesqua's best feature film music prize at IIFF SMR13 independent film festival 2025 (Best Feature Film Original Music category)
