= Moto Racer =

1997 video game

- Developer: Delphine Software International
- Publisher: Electronic Arts
- Designer: Paul Cuisset
- Composer: Raphaël Gesqua
- Platforms: Microsoft Windows, PlayStation
- Release: Windows: EU: August 1, 1997; NA: September 3, 1997; PlayStation: NA: October 28, 1997; EU: November 21, 1997
- Genre: Racing
- Modes: Single-player, multiplayer

Moto Racer, mislabeled as Moto Racer Gold, is an arcade style motorcycle racing game developed by Delphine Software International and published by Electronic Arts for Microsoft Windows and PlayStation. The game was originally to be published by BMG Interactive, but after BMG closed down its U.S. operations it sold the publication rights to Electronic Arts. Critics hailed the game as the first outstanding arcade-style racer to appear on PC, and the PlayStation version in turn was called a strong conversion in reviews.

== Gameplay ==
Players race on either a motocross bike or street bike, depending on the track. The PC version features a total of eight tracks, four of which are unlockable, while the PlayStation version adds two tracks for a total of ten. A multiplayer option is also available, allowing two players to compete over a LAN or Internet on the PC or split screen on the PlayStation version. The single player modes include "Time Attack" and "Championship". The most laps a player can do is eight on the Practice Race.

== Reception ==
Reception

Aggregate score
Aggregator	Score	
Aggregator	PC	PS
GameRankings	76%	80%

Review scores
Publication	Score	
Publication	PC	PS
CNET Gamecenter	8/10	2/10
Computer Games Strategy Plus	3.5/5	N/A
Computer Gaming World	4/5	N/A
Edge	8/10	7/10
Electronic Gaming Monthly	N/A	7.25/10
Game Informer	N/A	8/10
GameFan	N/A	82% (Note: Three critics of GameFan gave the PlayStation version each a score of 78, 82, and 85.)
GameRevolution	B+	N/A
GameSpot	7/10	7.2/10
IGN	N/A	7.5/10
Next Generation	5/5	5/5
Official U.S. PlayStation Magazine	N/A	5/5
PC Gamer (US)	91%	N/A

The game received favorable reviews on both platforms according to the review aggregation website GameRankings.

Next Generation said in an early review of the PC version that it "fills the vacant niche of the PC motorcycle racing genre admirably. With luck, more titles will use Direct3D as this one does." PC Gamer similarly said that the game does an exceptional job of satisfying PC gamers' previously unfulfilled desire for an arcade racer, summarizing that it "blends together all the great aspects of the genre into an experience that redefines fun. From ultra-fast graphics to heavenly control, this game delivers on all counts." He added that the game's visuals are impressive even without the use of a 3D accelerator card, and the multiplayer options and unlockables give it a higher replay value than most of the competition.

Critics widely praised the PlayStation version for its sharp graphics and strong sense of speed. Tim Soete of GameSpot remarked that "the gut-turning velocities achieved during parts of the game - and the requirement that your reflexes one-up this pace - is definitely where the challenge lies in Moto Racer." The vast majority also applauded the controls, particularly when using analog joypads. Jay Boor of IGN disagreed, saying the realism and precision of the bike's handling frustrated him. Crispin Boyer of Electronic Gaming Monthly (EGM) acknowledged that while the game is too easy on easy difficulty, medium difficulty is rather unforgiving, but he and co-reviewers John Ricciardi and Kelly Rickards found this outweighed by the strong controls and overall fun of the game. EGM guest reviewer David Siller gave Moto Racer one of its few negative reviews, citing poor track design. GamePro gave it a 4.5 out of 5 in both control and sound and a perfect 5 in graphics and fun factor, citing the exhilarating sense of speed, "instant onscreen responsiveness" of the controls, low-key musical score, and variety of tracks and options.

Reviewers for IGN and Next Generation agreed that the PlayStation port, while clearly inferior to the PC version in terms of graphics, is an exemplary conversion given the PlayStation's limitations and provides the same essential gaming experience as the PC original. Next Generation said, "Although perhaps not quite as technically proficient as the PC version, Moto Racer for PlayStation loses nothing in the essence of the gaming experience it offers. A remarkable achievement."

During the inaugural Interactive Achievement Awards, the PlayStation version of Moto Racer received a nomination for "Console Racing Game of the Year" by the Academy of Interactive Arts & Sciences.

== Sequels and spin-offs ==
Several sequels and spin-offs followed, including Moto Racer 2, Moto Racer World Tour, Moto Racer 3, Moto Racer 4, Moto Racer Advance and Moto Racer DS.

== Remake ==
In 2011, Anuman and Nobilis released a remake called Moto Racer 15th Anniversary for iOS and Microsoft Windows.
