= Paul Cuisset =

French game programmer (born 1964)

- Born: 1964 (age 61–62)
- Occupations: Designer, programmer
- Known for: Video games
- Spouse: Patricia Cuisset

Paul Cuisset (born 1964) is a French programmer and designer of several video games.

== Career ==
Cuisset was the lead designer of Delphine Software International and the creator of Flashback (1992), which was listed in the Guinness World Records as the best-selling French video game of all time.

Cuisset was also the managing director of the video game developer, Vector Cell, which he co-owned with Lexis Numerique. Cuisset designed two games under the Vector Cell banner, one of which being a 2013 remake of Flashback, but the titles were unsuccessful and the company went bankrupt in late 2013.

== Games ==
Titles released involving Paul Cuisset are listed below in chronological order.

- Phoenix (1987 video game) (1987, Atari ST)
- Space Harrier (1988, Atari ST)
- Future Wars (1989)
- Bio Challenge (1989)
- Operation Stealth (1990)
- Cruise for a Corpse (1991)
- Flashback (1992)
- Shaq Fu (1994)
- Fade to Black (1995)
- Time Commando (1996)
- Moto Racer (1997)
- Moto Racer 2 (1998)
- Darkstone (1999)
- Moto Racer 3 (2001)
- Mister Slime (2008)
- Amy (2012)
- Flashback (2013)
- Subject 13 (2015)
- Moto Racer 4 (2016)
- Flashback 2 (2023)
