= VectorCell =

French video game developer

- Type: Private
- Industry: Video games
- Founded: 2005; 21 years ago
- Defunct: November 18, 2013
- Headquarters: Villebon-sur-Yvette, France
- Key people: Paul Cuisset

VectorCell was a French video game developer founded in 2005. Owned by Paul Cuisset and Lexis Numérique, the company developed Amy (2012) for PlayStation 3 and Xbox 360. The company also planned to release Jesus Christ Super-Star on the iOS and Zeebo. Previous releases included Mister Slime, released under the Lexis Numérique label and published through SouthPeak Games in 2008. In January 2010, VectorCell licensed Lightsprint SDK for Amy.

Due to the lack of success of the 2013 Flashback remake, the company suffered from the same fate as Delphine Software International and closed down on 18 November 2013 after bankruptcy and liquidation.

== Games ==
Release date	Titles	Genre	Platforms
2012	Amy	Survival horror, stealth	PlayStation 3, Xbox 360
2013	Flashback	Platform	Xbox 360, PlayStation 3, PC
