= Flashback 2 =

- Developer: Microids
- Publisher: Microids
- Designer: Paul Cuisset
- Composer: Raphaël Gesqua
- Engine: Unity
- Platforms: PlayStation 5, Windows, Xbox Series X/S, Nintendo Switch, PlayStation 4, Xbox One
- Release: PlayStation 5, Windows, Xbox Series X/S; November 16, 2023; Nintendo Switch, PlayStation 4, Xbox One; 2025
- Genre: Action-adventure
- Mode: Single-player

Flashback 2 is a 2023 science fiction action-adventure game developed and published by Microids. It is a sequel to 1992's Flashback.

== Development and release ==
In May 2021, Flashback 2 was announced for PC and consoles. The game was developed by French developer Microids who did not specify how the game would be connected to previous series entry Fade to Black.

The game was released on November 16, 2023 for the PlayStation 5, Windows and Xbox Series X/S, with previous generation consoles getting their release in 2025.

== Story ==
Flashback 2 begins in the middle of Conrad's adventure in the original Flashback, before the plot diverges from that of the original game. Conrad continues his fight against the Morphs and seeks to stop their invasion.

== Reception ==
Reception

Aggregate score
Aggregator	Score
Metacritic	PS5: 37/100; PC: 30/100

Review scores
Publication	Score
Destructoid	4/10
GameStar	26%
IGN	2/10
PC Games (DE)	5/10

Flashback 2 received "generally unfavorable reviews", according to review aggregator Metacritic. Metacritic listed it the second worst game of 2023.
