= Flashback (2013 video game) =

- Developer: VectorCell
- Publisher: Ubisoft
- Engine: Unreal Engine 3
- Platforms: Xbox 360, Microsoft Windows, PlayStation 3
- Release: Xbox 360: WW: 21 August 2013; Windows; 1 October 2013; PlayStation 3: NA: 1 October 2013; PAL: 2 October 2013
- Genre: Platform
- Mode: Single-player

Flashback is a science fiction platform video game remake of the original 1992 Flashback. The game was developed by the original game designer, Paul Cuisset, with his studio, VectorCell, and published by Ubisoft. The game was released on 21 August 2013 on Xbox Live Arcade.

== Gameplay ==
The aiming system supports 360 degrees. The game's difficulty was decreased.

== Plot ==
The game begins with the protagonist, who tried to escape from Cyborgs using a jetbike. Unfortunately his vehicle got severely damaged and crashes in a jungle of Titan. He wakes up after a while, finds a gun and retrieves a holocube later on. His own hologram tells he is Conrad B. Hart, and he has to go find Ian in New Washington, telling he's not safe. After a little journey in the jungle, he meets Bolton, and asks to find his teleporter for medical assistance. After retrieving the teleporter, he teleports as he leaves his own ID card. After venturing for a while, Conrad meets Joe, he tells that New Washington is down the hole behind him, but an Anti-Gravity Belt is needed. To have it, he asks for several Grenada fruits. After swapping what they both want, Conrad jumps into the hole and activates the belt to safely arrive in New Washington.

Near Ian's place, he overhears a Cyborg interrogating him about a neurophage. After saving him, he gives a part of his memory back and gives a force field to protect him from bullets. Conrad then checks his GBI Virtual Reality with a virtual professor, who mocks him and tells him his own cryptic location. He finds a Memory Flash at the place, to learns about a deal with aliens in disguise in Death Tower. Conrad asks Joe for a new identity for the Death Tower TV show. Joe tells him that the cost would be 1500 credits, and points out the Administration Center to get a Work Permit for a salary. He uses Bolton's ID card to get a Work Permit. After doing his first job, he gets another Memory Flash, about a meeting between him and the real professor, telling him the Earth is being quietly invaded by aliens nicknamed Morphs. Professor then talks about a neurophage that he made to destroy them all. As Conrad performs other jobs, he finds other pieces of his memory as well as instructions to find the neurophage and its activator. With all the salary he got from performing jobs, he buys what he wanted from Joe, and enters the Death Tower TV show as Jay Carpenter.

After winning the show and getting a ticket to Earth, Conrad talks to the announcer about finishing up the deal. The disguised morph then reveals they have the new senator and senator's assistant Sonia, Conrad's girlfriend, and that they will soon be absorbed by The Mind. After killing the announcer, he uses the ticket to go to Earth to save Sonia and the planet.

Eventually, he is arrested in Earth's spaceport by corrupted cyborg cops, but manages to get out. He meets Ian again, who says that erasing his own memory to fool them didn't work, reminding him that he gave Conrad his first flashback, and thus reveals that he's a Morph, and the Morphs' goal: To perfect humanity according to the Morphs' vision for it. He gives Conrad his painful last Flashback: showing that he had a very risky plan to go to the Morphs' homeworld. He then drives a jetbike, and asks Bolton where is the senator, and talks about the Paradise Club. When he goes there, he witnesses a meeting between the senator and the Morphs, who absorbed him, and talks about the Earth's colonisation. The vent where he stands for falls under his weight and he is imprisoned by the Morphs. He manages to escape and meets Ian once more, and kills him. He finds a teleporter which leads him to the Morph homeworld.

After being teleported, he frees the professor from his prison, and professor then tells Conrad to get rid of an auxiliary brain so he can save Sonia. After that, he tells him to destroy The Mind, and use the neurophage in the planet's core. As he meets The Mind, it tries to persuade Conrad into being absorbed, only to get mocked, and Conrad says he prefers being himself. After destroying it, Conrad releases the neurophage. As he tells Sonia that he's sorry, the professor tells Conrad to run as there is a spacecraft not far away.

Conrad manages to leave the Morph Planet alive with the spacecraft as it explodes. He tries to find where he is on the map, only to learn that his position is unknown. Unhappy, as he goes to his room, his holocube shows a hologram of Conrad congratulating him. Conrad then enters into suspended animation as the spacecraft continues on its course. The credits shows the cutscenes, including one when the suspended animation ends as Conrad wakes up. The post-credits cutscene is a discussion between some of the characters, with Sonia feeling that Conrad is still alive.

== Development ==
VectorCell approached Ubisoft about remaking the original 1992 Flashback due to fan interest. Ubisoft's Guillaume Da Costa Vieira said that the company's employees were fans of the game and "jumped at the opportunity". They sought to recreate the game's "original spirit" while attempting to improve the game. Paul Cuisset, the original Flashback team lead, directed the remake. Five members from the original Delphine Software Flashback team joined him. Paul Cuisset had acquired the license for the game and was waiting for the right time to start the project. The game was first unveiled 10 April 2013 in Germany.

The development team considered the remake an expansion of the original. Improvements include features from both player feedback and improved technologies since 1992, e.g., a new skill system that trades points for skill improvements and character customization. The story has also been expanded and the graphics updated. The new graphics put the game in 2.5D from the original rotoscoped 2D. The story adds new dialogue, plot twists, and voice acting.

== Reception ==
Reception

Aggregate score
Aggregator	Score
Metacritic	(PC) 54/100 (X360) 50/100 (PS3) 40/100

Review scores
Publication	Score
Eurogamer	(X360) 5/10
Game Informer	(X360) 3/10
GameSpot	(X360) 4/10
GameTrailers	(X360) 3.6/10
Hardcore Gamer	(X360) 2/5
IGN	(X360) 5.8/10
Joystiq	(X360) 2/5
PlayStation Official Magazine – Australia	(PS3) 50%
Official Xbox Magazine (US)	(X360) 6.5/10
Polygon	(X360) 5/10
Retro Gamer	(X360) 56%
Digital Spy	(X360) 2/5
Metro	(PS3) 3/10

The PC and Xbox 360 versions received "mixed" reviews, while the PlayStation 3 version received "unfavourable" reviews, according to the review aggregation website Metacritic.
