= Mister Slime =

2008 video game

- Developer: Lexis Numérique
- Publisher: SouthPeak Games
- Designer: Paul Cuisset
- Platform: Nintendo DS
- Release: AU: May 2, 2008; NA: July 23, 2008; EU: July 25, 2008
- Genre: Platform
- Modes: Single-player, multiplayer

Mister Slime (known as Mr Slime in Australia and Mr. Slime Jr. in Europe) is a side-scrolling platform game by French studio Lexis Numerique that was released in 2008. The game was designed by Paul Cuisset, the former lead designer of Delphine Software International and the creator of Flashback.

== Plot ==
The eponymous main character must protect the Slime Village from the evil enemy Axons.

== Gameplay ==
The stylus is used to pull Mister Slime's four elastic arms to different anchor points spread throughout the levels. On top of that, players are able to send Mister Slime flying on a gust of wind and provide him air bubbles underwater. Both functions are executed by the player blowing into the system's built-in microphone.

The presentation is comparable to LocoRoco or World of Goo with physics that feature and bouncing characters. Also similar to both games is the characteristic elasticity playing an important role in the core gameplay.

== Reception ==
Reception

Aggregate score
Aggregator	Score
Metacritic	59/100

Review scores
Publication	Score
1Up.com	C+
GamePro	3.75/5
GameSpot	4.5/10
GameZone	7.5/10
IGN	5/10
NGamer	70%
Nintendo Power	6/10

The game received "mixed" reviews according to the review aggregation website Metacritic.
