= Shaq Fu: A Legend Reborn =

2018 video game

- Developer: Big Deez Productions
- Publishers: Mad Dog Games; Saber Interactive (Mobile)
- Producers: Artem Pozhilenkov; Avenir Sniatkov
- Designer: Sergey Snisarenko
- Programmer: Andrew Kishchenko
- Artist: Dmitriy Krayniuk
- Writers: Craig Sherman; Oliver Hollis-Leick
- Composer: Steve Molitz
- Platforms: Microsoft Windows; Nintendo Switch; PlayStation 4; Xbox One; iOS; Android
- Release: Windows, Switch, PS4, Xbox One; June 5, 2018; iOS, Android; August 2, 2018
- Genre: Beat 'em up
- Mode: Single-player

Shaq Fu: A Legend Reborn is a 2018 beat 'em up video game developed by Big Deez Productions and published by Mad Dog Games. It is a sequel to Shaq Fu (1994) and it was released for Microsoft Windows, Nintendo Switch, PlayStation 4, and Xbox One in June 2018. Former professional basketball player Shaquille O'Neal reprises his role from the original as the player character. The game received generally negative reviews upon release for all platforms except for the Xbox One version, which received a more mixed response.

== Story ==
In China, a young Shaq is found floating in the river by a young woman and is adopted by her. As he grows up, he is bullied for his height. He meets an old martial arts master named Ye-Ye, who trains him in the Wu Xing style.

Years later, Shaq, now a humble rickshaw puller, finds his village attacked by demons. He kills all the demons, but unfortunately, Ye-Ye is seemingly killed by a surprise attack. Before he passes out, he gives Shaq a "Gold Bond" and warns him that demons disguised as celebrities have been working to make humanity dumber through their actions, and he must kill them.

Shaq journeys across the world, slaying demon celebrities. However, his village is attacked once more by the leader of the Demons, Yen-Lo-Wang. Using the power of the Gold Bond, Shaq summons a whale-like creature to return to his village.

Shaq returns to his destroyed village, where Yen-Lo-Wang reveals herself to be Shaq's original adopted mother, who adopted him at first in order to improve her image. However, when she discovered the birthmark on his neck was a symbol meaning he would eventually destroy her, she attempted to kill him by throwing him into the river. Shaq defeats Yen-Lo-Wang and returns to being a rickshaw puller while being hailed as a hero.

However, Ye-Ye reveals himself to be alive, and warns Shaq that there is another celebrity, more powerful that Yen-Lo-Wang, is alive. Shaq and Ye-Ye prepare to face this new demon together.

== Gameplay ==
A Legend Reborn features gameplay that heavily differs from its predecessor, more akin to a beat 'em up. The player character has a variety of moves, such as rolling and dashing, which stuns enemies. Players can also chain attacks together and use a special attack.

== Development ==
In March 2014, an Indiegogo crowdfunding campaign was started for a sequel titled Shaq Fu: A Legend Reborn. The funding goal was US$450,000. If achieved, the game creators at Big Deez Productions promised that the game would be released for consoles (PC, PlayStation 4, Xbox One, Wii U, PlayStation 3, and Xbox 360). The campaign ended on May 5, with the funding goal exceeded at $473,884.

After A Legend Reborn was successfully funded, there was little significant word on its developmental status and release timetable over the next few years. In late 2016, the sequel's developers reported on Indiegogo that its development was nearly finished, but declined to provide a concrete release date. Over a month after Nintendo launched the Nintendo Switch, a special trailer confirmed that A Legend Reborn will be available on that system. Saber Interactive also announced that it would offer free copies of the game to early adopters of NBA Playgrounds on the console as compensation for the initial lack of online features. In early 2018, the game was delayed due to unexpected licensing issues that required some significant rework. The game was expected to come out in the second quarter of that year, and the Wii U, PlayStation 3 and Xbox 360 versions were cancelled. The game was released on June 5, 2018.

=== Barack Fu: The Adventures of Dirty Barry ===
Shortly after the game's release, on June 29, a DLC add-on titled Barack Fu: The Adventures of Dirty Barry was revealed in two launch trailers that were shared by multiple gaming groups and news sites alike; it was also made available for free to those who had purchased a physical copy of A Legend Reborn. Barack Fu continues the story of A Legend Reborn, following the ending of Shaq's campaign, with the player now taking control of a fictionalized version of former United States President Barack Obama through two new stages (increasing the full level count of the game from six to eight) as he goes through France and Outer Space to defeat a fictional take on rapper Kanye West.

== Reception ==
Reception

Aggregate score
Aggregator	Score
Metacritic	(NS) 49/100 (PC) 30/100 (PS4) 36/100 (XONE) 54/100

Review scores
Publication	Score
Destructoid	3/10
Nintendo Life	7/10 stars
Nintendo World Report	5.5/10
Pocket Gamer	2/5 stars

With the exception of the Xbox One version of the game, Shaq Fu: A Legend Reborn received "generally unfavorable" reviews according to review aggregator Metacritic. Kellen Beck from Mashable criticized the game's humor for being offensive, repetitive, and reliant on stereotypes. The PlayStation 4 version has an aggregated score of 35/100 on GameRankings.

== See also ==
- Barkley, Shut Up and Jam: Gaiden
