= Phoenix (1987 video game) =

1987 video game

- ERE Informatique cover
- Publishers: ERE Informatique; Infogrames
- Programmers: Patrick Guillemet; Paul Cuisset
- Artists: Christophe Bonnet; Michel Rho
- Writers: Patrick Guillemet; Paul Cuisset
- Composer: Philippe Ulrich
- Platform: Atari ST
- Release: 1987
- Genre: Space combat game
- Mode: single-player

Phoenix is a single-player first-person space flight shooter released in 1987 by ERE Informatique for the Atari ST. It was later published by Infogrames for the British market. The gameplay consists of piloting a spaceship across hyperspace routes represented by colored wireframe tiles created with vector graphics while shooting hostile gun turrets and black holes.

== Gameplay ==
Gameplay screenshot showing the hyperspace route tiles, including a red tile

The objective of Phoenix is to re-open 15 hyperspace routes which were closed by authorities, who also left gun turrets to guard the routes. In order to re-open the hyperspace routes, the player must pilot a spaceship known as the "Phoenix AY 21" to the end of each route. The hyperspace routes are represented by colored vector wireframe tiles. As the joystick is moved left or right, the tiles move under the ship, representing strafing movement of the craft, while the craft moves forward at a constant speed.

This movement is used to navigate the different colored sections and to dodge gun turrets and black holes. Red tiles increase the ship's energy level, which is slowly depleted as the game goes on, and is also used to fire the ship's guns. Light blue tiles and shots from gun turrets drain the ship's energy level. Green tiles cause the player to lose control of the ship. Purple tiles instantly destroy the ship, as do black holes (represented by two rotating yellow triangles) and flying off tiles into empty space. The Games Machine compared the gameplay to another game released in 1987: Cosmic Causeway: Trailblazer II, which also features colored tiles that affect the player as they move across them. Whether the Trailblazer series inspired Phoenix is unclear.

The player can also press the R button to enter an instant replay mode which replays the last flight.

== Reception ==
Infogrames cover

In the months following its release, Phoenix received mixed reviews. ACE in January 1988 gave it a 887/1000, then in November of the same year dropped the rating to a 780/1000, calling the game "a bit simple for full price now". The retail price at the time was £19.95. This is equivalent to £55.37 or $69.92 in February 2024. The Games Machine similarly gave the game a 71% rating in 1988. Happy Computer and Power Play rated the game at 58/100 and 4.5/10 respectively, both indicating the game is initially fun, but gets boring quickly.
