= Livid (film) =

- French theatrical poster
- Directed by: Julien Maury; Alexandre Bustillo
- Written by: Alexandre Bustillo; Julien Maury
- Produced by: Verane Frediani; Franck Ribiere
- Starring: Catherine Jacob; Marie-Claude Pietragalla; Chloe Coulloud; Chloe Marcq
- Cinematography: Laurent Bares
- Edited by: Baxter
- Music by: Raphaël Gesqua
- Production companies: La Fabrique 2; SND Films; La Ferme! Productions; Plug Effects; Canal+; CinéCinéma; Coficup; Backup Media; Cofimage 22
- Distributed by: La Fabrique 2
- Release dates: 11 September 2011 (TIFF); 7 December 2011 (France)
- Running time: 93 minutes
- Country: France
- Language: French

Livid (French: Livide) is a 2011 French supernatural horror film written and directed by Julien Maury and Alexandre Bustillo. It is their follow-up to the horror film Inside.

== Plot ==
Lucy Klavel is a young woman who starts her practical training as an at-home nurse. She is trained by an older lady, Mrs. Catherine Wilson. The last patient on their rounds lives in an old, remote mansion. Lucy enters the mansion, which is filled with stuffed animals, and finds Mrs. Wilson at the bed of the patient, Mrs. Deborah Jessel. Mrs. Wilson tells her that Jessel was once a prominent ballet teacher, but is now bedridden and in a coma. There is a rumor that Mrs. Jessel has a treasure of gold and jewels located somewhere on the property. After her first day on the job, Lucy tells her boyfriend, William, about the treasure. Lucy, Will, and Will's brother Ben decide to hunt for the treasure on Halloween night.

They enter the basement of the house through a window. In a room filled with stuffed animals gathered around a tea table, they find a single locked door. Lucy correctly suspects that a key worn by Jessel is the key to this door. Inside, they find a white sheet covering what looks like a stuffed mannequin of a young girl. Lucy suggests that this is the corpse of Jessel's mute daughter Anna, still dressed in a ballerina outfit. Lucy twists the key on the pedestal the corpse is standing on, and the corpse starts spinning slowly with music playing, like a ballerina on a music box.

They hear noises from the floor above and try to flee the house, but the window through which they entered is now secured by iron bars. While trying to find an exit, they become separated. Ben finds himself in an operating room with no door and no idea how he got there. He is killed by veiled ballerinas who appear out of nowhere.

Lucy sees Mrs. Jessel sitting at what was once Anna's tea party table. There is a flashback demonstrating that Mrs. Jessel was a very strict ballet teacher: a girl leaves the ballet class and Jessel later finds her lying dead in Anna's room; Anna is bent over the girl, drinking her blood. It is revealed that the Jessels are vampires.

Will is attacked by Ben, who is now a vampire. Will stabs Ben with a pair of scissors, but Mrs. Jessel attacks and kills him. Lucy discovers that Anna is not dead. Anna attempts to drink Lucy's blood, but Lucy pushes her away. Mrs. Wilson appears, attacks and sedates Lucy.

While Wilson watches, Mrs. Jessel implants the pupae of a moth into the throats of Lucy and Anna; this is a ritual to exchange their souls. Jessel believes that she has been successful when Anna awakes and her eye color has changed and she is in a different body. Jessel orders Anna to dance, but Anna does not respond. Wilson attempts to punish her, but Anna stabs her with scissors and then turns on Jessel. Both women fall to the floor. Although bleeding heavily, Jessel tries to bite Anna. Lucy whips her mother until she releases Anna, and the two girls throw Jessel off a third floor balcony.

Anna and Lucy escape from the mansion, and walk along a seaside cliff holding hands. Lucy (in Anna's body) leans over the cliff, but she does not fall. Instead, she flies into the sky. Her scars disappear, and Anna (in Lucy's body) watches her float away.

== Production ==
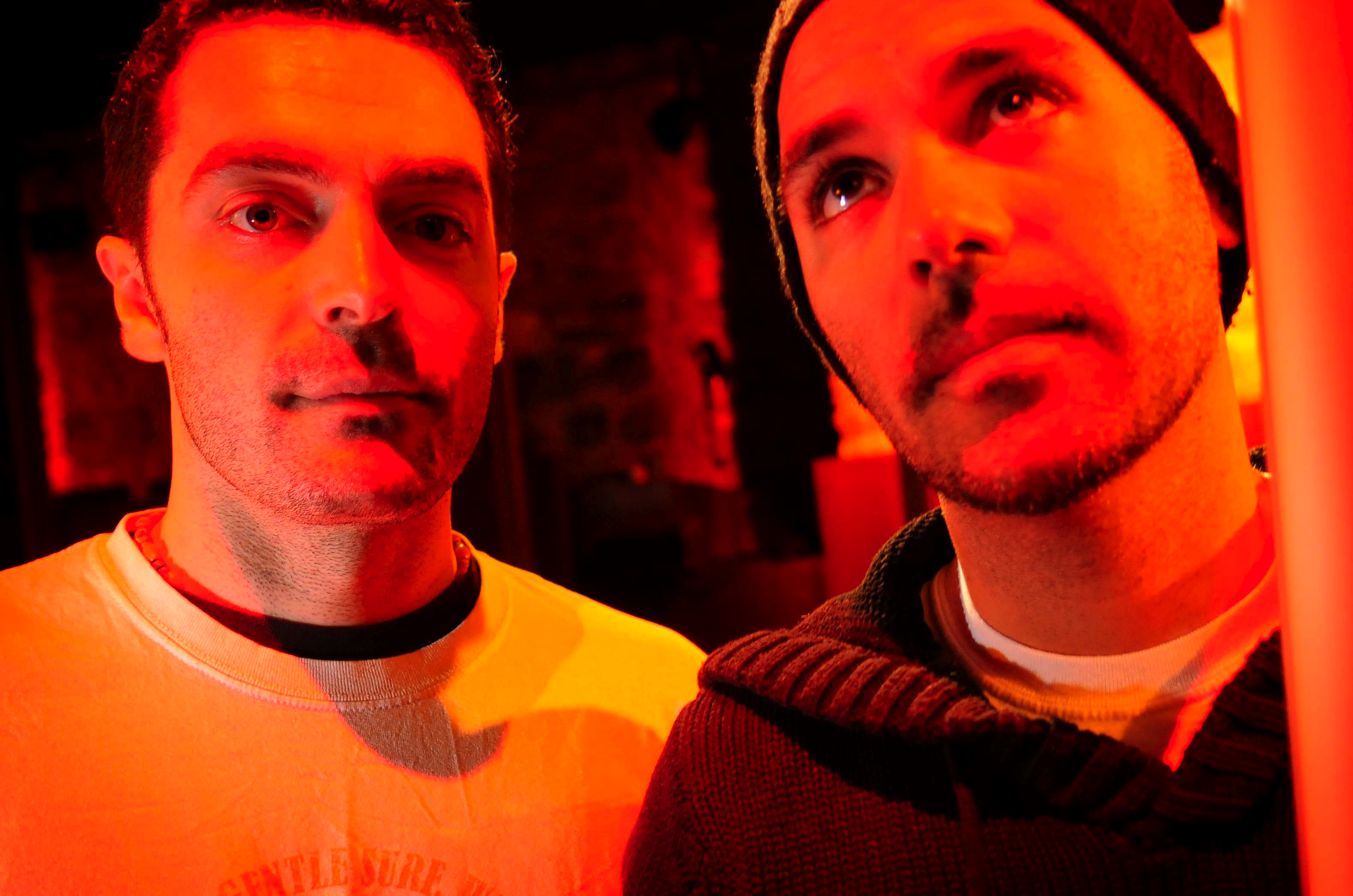
Julien Maury and Alexandre Bustillo

Livid was initially developed as an English-language production and was intended to be filmed partly in Ireland and partly in the United States. Directors Julien Maury and Alexandre Bustillo later recalled that Elijah Wood had been attached to the project and that they had planned to make the film with Robert Rodriguez. The proposed version had a budget of approximately $8 million. The filmmakers ultimately abandoned that incarnation and reworked the project as a French-language production with a budget of less than €2 million. They said that the reduced budget required them to use fewer locations, plot developments and visual effects, but allowed them to retain greater creative control, including keeping the film's original ending.

Principal photography took place in 2010. Interior scenes were filmed in Paris between 20 September and 22 October, while exterior filming subsequently took place in Brittany, including Quimper, Locronan and Rosmeur. A promotional reel from the production was shown at the American Film Market.

Maury and Bustillo conceived the film as a departure from the more realistic violence of their previous film, Inside. Bustillo said that they wanted to return to supernatural horror and create a story involving fantastical creatures rather than make another film grounded entirely in reality. The directors chose Brittany partly because of its association with Celtic folklore and legends, using the landscape to give the story a rural and folkloric atmosphere without directly adapting a specific Breton legend.

== Cast ==
- Chloé Coulloud as Lucy
- Jérémy Kapone as Ben
- Félix Moati as William
- Catherine Jacob as Mrs. Wilson
- Marie-Claude Pietragalla as Deborah Jessel
- Chloé Marcq as Anna
- Loïc Berthezene as Lucy's father
- Béatrice Dalle as Lucy's mother
- Rajan Maman as Tony's Son

== Release ==
Livid premiered in the Midnight Madness programme of the 2011 Toronto International Film Festival on 11 September 2011. It was subsequently screened at the Sitges Film Festival, where Marc Thiébault received the award for Best Production Design.

The film was released theatrically in France on 7 December 2011. Its French theatrical run attracted 5,108 admissions.

Before the film's festival premiere, Dimension Films acquired its North American distribution rights in July 2011, although no release plans were announced at the time. Despite the acquisition, the film did not receive a proper United States release and remained unavailable there for more than a decade. In March 2022, Shudder made the film available in the United States as part of its Modern French Horror collection, marking its first official American availability since its festival screenings.

== Reception ==
On Rotten Tomatoes, 89% of nine critics' reviews are positive.

David D'Arcy of Screen Daily responded positively to the film, praising its production values, cinematography and production design. He compared its atmosphere and imagery to the work of Guillermo del Toro and Dario Argento, and also praised Chloé Coulloud's performance. Nicholas Bell of IONCINEMA similarly praised the film's Gothic atmosphere and described it as a "fun, creepy tale" reminiscent of Argento's Suspiria. Bell considered its emphasis on mood and supernatural imagery a deliberate departure from the more graphic horror of the directors' previous film, Inside.

Other critics were more divided. Todd Brown of ScreenAnarchy praised the film's visual design, mythology and fairy-tale atmosphere, but criticized its characterization and narrative, arguing that it lacked sufficient tension and existed awkwardly between experimental arthouse cinema and conventional horror. Serena Whitney of Dread Central gave the film three-and-a-half stars out of five, praising its visual style and willingness to depart from Inside, while criticizing its later scenes for relying on conventional scares and for failing to develop a coherent plot.

== Remake ==
An English-language remake for the film was written by David Birke and was to be directed by Nicholas McCarthy, but was not made.
