= The Deep House =

- Official release poster
- Directed by: Alexandre Bustillo; Julien Maury
- Written by: Alexandre Bustillo; Julien Maury; Julien David; Rachel Parker
- Produced by: Jean-Charles Levy; Clément Miserez
- Starring: James Jagger; Camille Rowe
- Cinematography: Jacques Ballard
- Edited by: Baxter; Thialy Sow
- Music by: Raphaël Gesqua
- Production companies: Logical Pictures; Umédia; Forecast Pictures; XYZ Films
- Distributed by: Apollo Films
- Release date: June 30, 2021
- Running time: 85 minutes
- Country: France
- Languages: English; French
- Box office: $1.9 million

The Deep House is a 2021 English-language French supernatural horror film written and directed by Julien Maury and Alexandre Bustillo. The film stars James Jagger and Camille Rowe. Blumhouse Television and Epix acquired the film for North American distribution.

The film was released in France on 30 June 2021 by Apollo Films and in the United States on 5 November 2021 by Blumhouse Television and Epix.

== Plot ==
Ben and Tina are a young, engaged couple living in New York who are both passionate YouTube contributors and are travelling Europe to seek out reputedly haunted houses to live-record their experiences. One day, they go to south-west France to seek out a sanatorium submerged in an artificial lake, only to find it a crowded vacation spot. A local, Pierre, offers to take them to an isolated branch of the lake in the forest of Chanteloup, an area which was artificially submerged in 1984 to prevent frequently recurring, devastating floods. The area he is leading them to contains a mansion which he claims has remained perfectly preserved.

Reaching the spot, Ben and Tina submerge, finding the house in a short while, with its contents strangely well-preserved. However, eerie things begin to happen after they enter the house; they hear strange voices and noises, the motion tracker on their drone indicates movement while there is nothing to trigger it, and their electronic equipment inexplicably begins malfunctioning. In addition, in some of the rooms they find lots of photos, posters and news articles showing missing children, as well as satanic symbols and a score of violent scratches at the front door post. In the kitchen, they discover a door blocked by a large crucifix, and opening it, they enter a room containing two corpses in chains and torture masks suspended above a satanic pentagram, and a side room filled with pickled human body parts. Ben and Tina try to flee the house, but the window they entered through is suddenly blocked off by a brick wall, and their frantic search for other exits is in vain.

While trying to open a grate in the cellar with the two bodies, Tina is suddenly attacked. The assault ceases abruptly, but strangely Ben denies that anything unusual has happened. Curious, Ben removes the masks from the corpses, revealing them to be the Montégnacs, the family who owned the house. The two corpses suddenly come to life and chase them through the house. As they try to escape through a chimney, the shaft collapses, trapping them on different floors. In an upstairs bedroom, Ben finds a family tree featuring Pierre, revealing him as the Montégnacs' son and indicating that he lured them to the house on purpose, before he is attacked by an undead girl - the Montégnacs' daughter Sarah - and possessed by her. When Tina finds him, he leads her to a hidden sitting room in the basement where Sarah, through Ben and a gruesome film reel, reveals that Mr. Montégnac and Pierre kidnapped children from the surrounding area to use as satanic sacrifices. The elder Montégnacs and Sarah were eventually killed by an avenging mob, but Pierre managed to escape.

Under Sarah's influence, Ben tries to convince Tina to join the family. Panicked and with her air supply depleted, Tina flees into a secret satanic chapel, where she finds a shaft leading out. Ben catches up with her and tries to kill her, but she wounds him with a diving knife, shocking him out of his possession. Before they can escape together, Sarah stabs Ben to death. The Montégnacs then turn on Tina, but she escapes up the shaft, which leads back into the lake. But just below the water's surface, the remaining air in her lungs gives out, and she drowns.

After the credits, there is a brief scene in which two new divers look out over the lake, accompanied by Pierre.

== Cast ==
- James Jagger as Ben
- Camille Rowe as Tina
- Éric Savin as Pierre Montégnac
- Alexis Servaes as Monsieur Montégnac
- Anne Claessens as Madame Montégnac
- Carolina Massey as Sarah Montégnac

== Production ==
Principal photography took place from 27 January to 13 March 2020 and from 15 to 26 June 2020 at Studios Lites (in Vilvoorde, Belgium), in the Occitanie region (in the, Raviège and Saint Peyres lakes) from 6 to 10 July 2020.

== Release ==
The film was released in France on 30 June 2021 by Apollo Films and in the United States on 5 November 2021 by Blumhouse Television and Epix.

== Reception ==
On review aggregator Rotten Tomatoes, the film holds an approval rating of 68% based on 19 reviews, with an average rating of 6/10.

Meagan Navarro, of Bloody Disgusting, gave the film 3.5/5 stars, and wrote that "The Deep House offers a slow, dark descent that builds to a satisfying conclusion (...) successfully blending two subgenres that couldn’t be further apart and execute it with impressive ambition. That daring ability to test the bounds of horror, at least on a technical level, is always welcome in the genre space, even if not a perfect success."
