= Darkstone =

1999 video game

Darkstone: Evil Reigns
- Developer: Delphine Software International
- Publishers: EU: Electronic Arts; NA: Gathering of Developers (PC); NA: Take-Two Interactive (PS)
- Directors: Paul Cuisset; Bertrand Gibert
- Producers: Paul Cuisset; Philippe Delamarre
- Designer: Paul Cuisset
- Programmers: Benoist Aron; Claude Levastre; Boris Vidal-Madjar
- Artists: Denis Mercier; Frédéric Michel; Thierry Levastre
- Writers: Mathieu Gaborit; Jean-Luc Dumon
- Composer: Christophe Rime
- Platforms: Microsoft Windows, PlayStation, Android, iOS
- Release: Windows: NA: 26 July 1999; EU: 18 September 1999; PlayStation: NA: 30 January 2001; EU: 9 March 2001; iOS, Android; 19 March 2014
- Genre: Action role-playing
- Modes: Single-player, multiplayer

Darkstone: Evil Reigns (Darkstone in North America) is an action role-playing video game developed by Delphine Software International for Microsoft Windows and PlayStation released in 1999.

In 2014, the French publisher Anuman Interactive launched a remake available on iPad, iPhone and Android, with the cooperation of the original game's author Paul Cuisset.

== Plot ==
In the distant past a corrupt monk, Draak, turned against the goddess of light, Kaliba, and turned himself into a dragon. However, he was eventually thwarted from destroying the world via the Time Orb, created from seven of Kaliba's tears. To protect the Time Orb from Draak's followers, it was split apart again by Kaliba's monks and the seven crystals hidden across the four lands of Uma.

The game begins when Draak has recovered from his earlier defeat and returned with his minions to the world of Uma. As part of his return he has created the Darkstone, which drains life energy from Uma, bringing death and mayhem. Players take on the role of an adventurer who has to recreate the Time Orb and use this to slay Draak in his lair.

Beginning in an unnamed village, the player can choose from a range of characters (warrior/Amazon, wizard/sorceress, assassin/thief and monk/priestess) and from here they quest across the four lands of Uma - Ardyl, Marghor, Omar and Serkesh - to solve quests, kill the evil creatures roaming the lands and delve into dungeons to locate the seven crystals to form the Time Orb. At some point in the gameplay the Darkstone itself erupts out of the ground in the village, switching the game from the previous colour scheme of a sunny day to more oppressive purples.

There are seven crystals to be found after completing quests in the dungeons: the purple Crystal of Wisdom, the red Crystal of Virtue, the blue Crystal of Bravery, the yellow Crystal of Nobility, the turquoise Crystal of Compassion, the green Crystal of Integrity and the grey Crystal of Strength. These are magically reassembled by the hermit Sebastian to form the crystal Time Orb.

Villagers will ask the player to do optional quests in return for money, either retrieving artifacts or killing an infamous monster, and are randomly selected for each new game. The artifacts are the Holy Grail, the Royal Diadem, the Shield of Light, the Unicorn's Horn, the Horn of Plenty, the Dragon's Scale, the Magic Anvil, the Path Book, the Medallion of Melchior, the Sacred Scroll, the Stone of Souls, the Cursed Sword, the Storm Flower, the Claw of Sargon, the Celestial Harp, the Bard's Music Score and the Broken Vase. The monsters are the ratman Buzbal the Furious, the vampire Nosferatu and the skeletal Evil Garth.

The crystal quests are found by exploring the lands of Uma to find NPCs who send you into nearby dungeons.

== Gameplay ==
A typical medieval RPG, Darkstone is similar to Baldur's Gate and Diablo in gameplay style and themes.

Gameplay revolves around improving the character stats of strength, magic, dexterity and vitality as well as the character's gear, weapons, magical knowledge, etc. The four lands of Uma increase in difficulty and are accessed sequentially, with different enemies patrolling the lands and dungeons beneath.

The village acts as an initial training area with firing ranges and example weapons, then subsequently as a trade base for adventurers to sell their loot, bank their cash, buy upgrades, repair armour and weaponry, buy new spellbooks and stock up on health and mana potions as well as food (characters can die from hunger). It is possible to pick up cursed items, such as a cloak that makes the player randomly drop items from their inventory, so a shopkeeper can remove these for you. Finally, if the player wants to hear a song about the Darkstone, they can toss a coin to the singer Audren.

Magic can be learnt by all characters, via finding or buying spellbooks, with 32 potential spells of varying difficulty. A variety of skills can also be learnt, such as thieving from other characters, repairing your own gear, disarming traps, etc. Spells and skills can be acquired by all character types apart from lycanthropy, which can only be learnt by the sorceress. This allows her to change into a werewolf and converts all magic stat points to strength points.

Quests for each new game are randomly selected from 20 options, with different dungeon placement and land layouts, improving the game's replayability. The PC version allows the player to control two characters, switching between them at will, though the PlayStation version only allowed for a single character.

== Development ==
Darkstone was developed under the working title Dragon Blade and went through several iterations, initially being designed as a fully 3D game akin to Tomb Raider. After the game's original publisher, BMG Interactive, closed its doors, work on Dragon Blade went into a suspended state, with Delphine putting most of its resources towards developing Moto Racer 2.

== Release ==
Darkstone was released in 1999 for the PC. Although Delphine self-published the game in Europe, it was instead published by Gathering of Developers in the US. In March 2000, Delphine released an editor for custom quests via their website. Simultaneously, Delphine also released Darkstone: Journey in Uma online, a free expansion for Darkstone which contained additional quests.

A PlayStation version was made available in 2001. Versions for iOS and Android was later released on 19 March 2014. The game was eventually released on Steam for modern operating systems.

=== Darkstone Restoration ===
Darkstone Restoration is a remaster/restoration of the original and was released into early access on June 23, 2026 by developer Paul Cuisset on Steam and GOG. The game is framed as a remaster/restoration rather than a full remake.

Rather than rebuilding the 1999 action RPG ground-up with a new engine or modern art style, Darkstone Restoration seeks to preserve the core assets, mechanics, and design of the original while porting it for modern systems including native 64-bit Windows support, modern resolutions, borderless windowed mode, frame-rate cap configuration, and updated lighting/shadow effects. The game also includes quality of life enhancements such as modern controller support, auto-gold pickup, UI/font readability fixes, a quick-access spell bar, and inventory auto-sort. Brand new features for this title include brand-new shared-world, couch co-op mode, and a Buddy Mode that allows you to control your companion hero on the fly. And lastly Legacy Mode, an option for purists to render the exact authentic 1999 visual style and fonts.

== Reception ==
=== Reviews ===
Reception

Aggregate scores
Aggregator	Score	
Aggregator	PC	PS
GameRankings	77%	65%
Metacritic	N/A	58/100

Review scores
Publication	Score	
Publication	PC	PS
CNET Gamecenter	8/10	N/A
Computer Games Strategy Plus	4/5	N/A
Computer Gaming World	3.5/5	N/A
Electronic Gaming Monthly	N/A	3.17/10 (Note: Three critics of Electronic Gaming Monthly gave the PlayStation version each a score of 4.5/10, 4/10, and 1/10.)
EP Daily	6.5/10	N/A
Game Informer	N/A	7.25/10
GameFan	79%	N/A
GameRevolution	C	D−
GameSpot	8.6/10	6/10
IGN	9/10	6.9/10
Next Generation	4/5	3/5
Official U.S. PlayStation Magazine	N/A	3.5/5
PC Accelerator	6/10	N/A
PC Gamer (US)	90%	N/A

The PlayStation version received mixed reviews according to the review aggregation website Metacritic.

IGN said of the PC version that, despite playing 'very similarly to Diablo', it 'is an incredibly fun and addictive game' and that the 'voice-overs are clean and crisp, and surprisingly well acted'. For the PlayStation version, however, the website later stated, 'anybody who liked Diablo or anything else in the realm of dungeon-hack RPGs should be able to get their pocket-change's worth out of it', but that the 3D presentation means there is a loss of graphical detail and the lack of story means that it is a basic hack n slash dungeon crawler. Jeff Lundrigan of NextGen's November 1999 issue called the former "An addictive little title that is, in some ways, even better than the trendsetter it closely resembles." Eighteen issues later, however, Emmett Schkloven called the latter "an addictive action RPG port, and the graphics are impressive. But if its generic elements prevent it from being a classic, the cheap entry fee still makes it worthwhile."

Michael L. House of AllGame gave the PC version four-and-a-half stars out of five, saying that it "contains a veritable treasure-trove of other features such as generously creepy sound effects, heart-rending cries for help when your co-companion needs help, a haunting and effective music track (be sure to give the balladeers in town a few gold pieces, then just sit back, close you eyes and enjoy), supremely enjoyable multi-player action, incredibly deep quests and integrated puzzle-solving (such as stringing events and knowledge together to complete a sub-quest). I don't throw recommendations around lightly -- but if you're a big RPG fan like me, you owe it to yourself to grab this one." John Thompson gave the PlayStation version three-and-a-half stars out of five, saying, "In the end, Darkstone plays well, even if it is a bit repetitive and clichéd. For ten dollars, fans of the genre can't do any better, and even weekend hack-n-slashers just might get a kick out of this game without feeling like they paid 30 bucks too much." Edge gave the former version six out of ten, saying, "The particle effects and realtime lighting generated by the multitude of magic spells are fantastic, and it is certainly one of the most cleanly presented PC games you're ever likely to see. But Darkstone lacks passion, and that's a fatal flaw in any roleplaying game, no matter how innovative and easy it is to play."

Barry Brenesal of GamePro called the PC version "a Diablo clone: a real-time action game complete with spells, swords, dozens of quests, and thousands of monsters-and a few interesting ideas of its own." (Note: GamePro gave the PC version 4/5 for graphics, two 2/5 scores for sound and control, and 2.5/5 for fun factor.) However, Uncle Dust said of the PlayStation version, "Even at its low price, Darkstone isn't worth the money. It's far better to spend a few more bucks for a used copy of any of the terrific RPGs that have come out for the PlayStation over the years." (Note: GamePro gave the PlayStation version 1.5/5 for graphics, two 2/5 scores for sound and fun factor, and 3/5 for control.)

=== Sales ===
The PC version debuted at #13 on PC Data's computer game sales rankings for August 1999. The firm tracked 63,553 domestic sales of the game through the end of 1999. This number rose to roughly 75,000 units by March 2000, which led GameSpot's writer P. Stephan "Desslock" Janicki to remark that the game "sold quite poorly". As of October 2001, the PC version had sold around 130,000 units in the US.

=== Awards ===
The PC version was a nominee for CNET Gamecenter's 1999 "RPG" award, which went to Asheron's Call. It was also nominated for the "Role-Playing Game of the Year" award at GameSpot's Best and Worst of 1999 Awards, which went to Planescape: Torment.
