= Moto Racer World Tour =

2000 video game

- Developer: Delphine Software International
- Publishers: EU: Sony Computer Entertainment; NA: Infogrames
- Platform: PlayStation
- Release: EU: 29 September 2000; NA: 7 November 2000
- Genre: Racing
- Modes: Single-player, multiplayer

Moto Racer World Tour is a 2000 racing video game developed by Delphine Software International for the PlayStation. Sony Computer Entertainment released it in Europe while Infogrames released it in North America.

In Moto Racer World Tour, the player drives a motorcycle in races against opponents. A large portion of the game centers on the World Tour Championship game mode, which tasks the player with completing a series races against the AI.

== Gameplay ==
A motorcyclist drives in a race on pavement.

The game places the player in motocross races against opponents on various terrain. The game plays as an arcade racer, where it does not attempt to perfectly simulate actual motocross. The main portion of the game is featured around the World Tour Championship mode, which places the player in races of varying degrees of difficulty, and requires the player to beat their opponents in sequence. An arcade mode allows players to choose any event for single races. Once the player has completed some championships, the game opens up new modes for the player, including traffic (where the player races through incoming traffic), dragster (drag racing), and freestyle (freestyle motocross).

Moto Racer World Tour contains race tracks on normal pavement, grass, and dirt, lending to a variety of different handling techniques. An easy turn on pavement can cause a bike to spin out on dirt if the player is not careful about how hard they turn. In order to adjust to the different terrain, handling can be adjusted through a detailed pit stop, where the player can choose the looseness of their suspension and their tires among other things. The game, however, lacks Moto Racer 2's track editor.

== Reception ==
Reception

Aggregate score
Aggregator	Score
GameRankings	67%

Review scores
Publication	Score
Electronic Gaming Monthly	7.5/10
Game Informer	7/10
IGN	8.7/10
Jeuxvideo.com	13/20
Mega Fun	71%
Next Generation	1/5
Official U.S. PlayStation Magazine	4/5
PlayStation: The Official Magazine	8/10

The game received average reviews according to the review aggregation website GameRankings. IGN's Douglass C. Perry wrote that Moto Racer World Tour ranked "... up there in the top five motorcycle games on the system". He praised the game's fun, arcade style play, but noted that the game "was quite void" of many sounds. GamePro's Lamchop criticized the game's controls for being tough to handle, although he praised the game's good background music. (Note: GamePro gave the game two 4/5 scores for graphics and sound, 3/5 for control, and 3.5/5 for fun factor.) However, NextGen's Doug Trueman wrote in his scathing review: "Moto Racer World Tour is clearly an effort to siphon off some of the success of Excitebike 64. What makes it stand apart from most bike racers is that it enables you to race in both outdoor and indoor motocross events, as well as superbike competitions. But, like most of the bikes it features, this title is mired in muck."
