= Flashback (1992 video game) =

1992 video game

- Original Amiga cover art
- Developer: Delphine Software International (Note: SNES, MS-DOS CD-ROM, 3DO, CD-i and Jaguar versions developed by Tiertex; Mac OS version developed by Presage Software; Dreamcast version developed by Chui.)
- Publisher: U.S. Gold: Dreamcast JoshProd Switch Microids
- Director: Paul Cuisset
- Designer: Paul Cuisset
- Composers: Jean Baudlot; Raphaël Gesqua; Fabrice Visserot
- Series: Flashback
- Platform: Amiga: Mega Drive/Genesis, Super NES, MS-DOS, PC-9801, FM Towns, Sega CD, Acorn Archimedes, 3DO, CD-i, Atari Jaguar, Mac OS, iOS, Symbian, Maemo, Dreamcast, Nintendo Switch, PlayStation 4, Xbox One
- Release: November 1992: Amiga; EU: November 1992 Mega Drive/Genesis; NA: 20 February 1993; PAL: June 1993 Super NES; JP: 22 December 1993; NA: February 1994; PAL: 1994 MS-DOS; EU: 1993; NA: 1993 Sega CD; NA: November 1994 3DO; JP: 17 February 1995; NA: 24 March 1995; EU: 1995 CD-i; EU: March 1995 Jaguar; NA: 9 August 1995; EU: August 1995 Mac OS; NA: 1995 iOS; WW: May 7, 2009 Dreamcast; WW: November 2017 Switch; NA: 17 June 2018; EU/AU: 19 June 2018 PlayStation 4; WW: 20 November 2018 Windows; WW: 29 November 2018
- Genre: Cinematic platform
- Mode: Single-player

Flashback, released as Flashback: The Quest for Identity in the United States, is a 1992 cinematic platformer developed by Delphine Software and published by U.S. Gold for the Amiga. It was directed, written, designed, and partially programmed by Paul Cuisset, who had previously created the adventure game Future Wars with Éric Chahi. Flashback was ported to the Mega Drive/Genesis, MS-DOS, Acorn Archimedes, and Super NES in 1993. CD-ROM versions for the Sega CD, 3DO, CD-i, MS-DOS, Macintosh, and FM Towns were released in 1994 and 1995, followed by a cartridge version for the Atari Jaguar in 1995. In 2017, the game was released worldwide on the Dreamcast, featuring graphic assets and cutscenes from the MS-DOS version and music from the Amiga version. An updated port titled Flashback: Remastered Edition was released for Nintendo Switch on 7 June 2018, for PlayStation 4 on 20 November 2018, and for Windows on 29 November 2018. The game was also released in October 2023 for the Evercade platforms as part of Delphine collection cartridge, and is based on the original Mega Drive/Genesis version.

It was originally advertised as a "CD-ROM game on a cartridge", and features fully hand-drawn backdrops and rotoscoped animation, with unusually fluid movements similar to Prince of Persia from 1989. The video capture technique of Flashback was invented independently of Prince of Persia, using a more complicated method of first tracing video images onto transparencies. The game was a commercial and critical success and was listed in the Guinness World Records as the best-selling French game of all time. Its sequel is Fade to Black in 1995. In 2013, a Flashback remake by VectorCell was released for the PC and consoles. Flashback 2 by Microids, was released on 16 November 2023 for the PlayStation 5, Windows, and Xbox Series X/S, with previous generation consoles getting their release early 2024.

== Gameplay ==
Conrad fights two corrupt cops in the Mega Drive/Genesis version.

As a cinematic platformer, Flashback features gameplay similar to that of 1989's Prince of Persia, and Delphine's Another World released in 1991. Each level spans many non-scrolling screens, nearly all of which feature multiple levels of altitude. This requires the player character Conrad to jump, grab onto ledges, climb, use elevators, and drop onto lower levels. Conrad exhibits realistic human running speed and jumping ability, and realistic weakness. He dies if he falls from a great height.

Conrad carries a pistol with unlimited ammunition; a force shield, which absorbs a certain number of shots before needing recharging, acting as Conrad's health; and a portable force field with unlimited use, which can act as a temporary barrier to block enemies' shots.

As Conrad progresses through the game's seven levels, he is increasingly presented with spatial puzzles, requiring the player to discover how to guide him toward his destination. Late in the game, Conrad receives a teleportation device, and is able to progress by throwing the device and teleporting into otherwise unreachable areas.

== Plot ==
In the year 2142, intelligence agent Conrad B. Hart awakens in a jungle on the planet Titan, with no memory of how he got there. While exploring his surroundings, Conrad comes across a recording containing a message made by himself, advising him to find his friend Ian in the city of New Washington on the planet. Making his way there, Conrad arrives to find Ian being attacked by the local police for unknown reasons. After saving him, Ian uses a regenerator device to restore Conrad's memories, using a digital copy that Conrad had sent him.

The device causes Conrad to recall that he had recently made a visor designed for analysing the density of molecular structures in organic life, but through its use had inadvertently discovered an alien species called Morphs had infiltrated human society. Fearful of what they were doing, Conrad sent a copy of his memories to Ian as a precaution, before attempting to warn the authorities, only to be caught by the Morphs who erased all knowledge of their existence from his mind and attempted to get rid of him.

Seeking to uncover more, Conrad vows to return to Earth to inform his superiors, but is informed by Ian his only hope of leaving Titan is to win a ticket in a gladiatorial deathmatch game known as "Death Tower", alongside acquiring forged papers - the latter requiring Conrad to take on a series of dangerous jobs around New Washington. After acquiring both, Conrad returns to Earth, but finds that Morph infiltrators were prepared, forcing him to defend himself while breaching their hideout under a local nightclub.

Inside the hideout, Conrad spies on a group of Morphs through a vent, hearing them discussing their plan to conquer Earth thanks to their subtle efforts to give them new technology they can utilize. Unfortunately, the vent gives way, causing Conrad to be captured. Managing to escape, he fights his way through the hideout, eventually uncovering a teleport to the Morphs' home planet. Determined to stop them, he comes across a human prisoner named Phillip Howard Clark, who the Morphs had been using for their own ends.

Agreeing to free him, Conrad opens his cell, but is powerless to stop a Morph executing Phillip. Before dying, they hand him an atomic charge. Uncovering his diary, Conrad learns Phillip had been manipulated to help the Morphs plans for conquering humanity, and had thus sent blueprints for the visor technology to Titan, hoping someone would attempt to recreate it. Conrad learns that the atomic charge he was given was designed to destroy the "Master Brain", an entity that controls the Morphs deep within the planet's core.

Forcing it to become active and expose itself, and guided by Phillip's voice, Conrad plants the charge on an unstable platform above the core, and then forces the Master Brain to trigger a tremor, leading to the charge dropping into the core. Conrad then escapes with a Morph's spacecraft moments before the planet is destroyed. Unable to navigate back home due to the galaxy he is now in, Conrad puts himself in suspended animation while his ship drifts into space, leading up to the events of Fade to Black.

== Development and release ==
The PC version has an extended introductory sequence and more minor cut scenes than the Amiga version, such as when picking up items. In the Amiga version, the user can see these scenes by enabling them (although with few seconds of delay every time the animations load) or by playing the game entirely from the hard drive. The Amiga version also had an option to zoom in on the action whenever Conrad opens fire. Due to criticism of the look, it was removed from all other versions, although an option to play the game zoomed in remained in the PC version. The message that Conrad writes in the ending was also different in this release. The Macintosh version was developed by Presage Software.

The game was originally released on 3.5" floppy disk for MS-DOS. The re-release on CD-ROM for the Sega CD (later adapted to the PC CD-ROM, 3DO and CD-i) featured redone pre-rendered cinematic FMVs with voice acting and sound effects. The Sega CD version also has voice work for gameplay and CD tracks for each level which were not carried to the other CD-ROM conversions. The Jaguar port has the title screen that these versions have, but the music is different and the cutscenes are as on the original releases.

In 2013, Paul Cuisset told Retro Gamer: "The best version for me is the Mega Drive version. The game was created for this platform".

In North America, the Genesis, Super NES and Sega CD versions featured a Marvel comic book within the manual in order to explain the initial story. The PAL releases of the Mega Drive and Super NES versions (there was no Mega CD version in the PAL region) omitted the comic and instead featured a textual prologue. In Spain, Sega promoted Flashback through a Mega Drive console bundle called the Flash Pack, which also included Sonic the Hedgehog. The bundle was advertised in June 1993 for 26,000 pesetas before VAT. The Super NES port featured some minor censorship due to Nintendo's content guidelines at the time. Changes included New Washington's bar becoming a cafe and Death Tower being renamed Cyber Tower, while the enemy mutants (who had natural skin colors in other versions) were recolored green.

A two-track CD soundtrack was released featuring music inspired by the game, but not directly from it.

Flashback, along with Another World, shipped as a single retail package by Microids for the PlayStation 4, Nintendo Switch, and Xbox One in Europe on 16 April 2020.

== Reception ==
Reception

Aggregate score
Aggregator	Score
Metacritic	77/100 (NS)

Review scores
Publication	Score
AllGame	4.5/5 (MAC); 4/5 (3DO); 4/5 (SCD); 4/5 (Genesis)
Electronic Gaming Monthly	8.25/10 (SNES); 8/10, 7/10, 7/10, 8/10 (SCD)
Famitsu	8/10, 8/10, 8/10, 9/10 (SFC)
Next Generation	3/5 (SCD, 3DO); 4/5 (MAC)
Entertainment Weekly	B (SCD)
MegaTech	94%
Mega	94%
CD-i	92% (CDI)

Awards
Publication	Award
Sega	Best Action Adventure RGP Game of the Year
Electronic Gaming Monthly	Editor's Choice Three Continuous Months
Game Informer	Game of the Year
Nintendo Power	Best of Show Winter CES
Game Pro	Action Adventure of the Year
Electronic Gaming Monthly	Editor's Choice Gold Award

About 750,000 copies were sold by 1995.

Computer Gaming World approved of Flashback's "superbly rotoscoped graphics", "fluid movement", and sound card audio. Criticizing the awkward interface and use of save points, the magazine concluded that it "is an excellent game that truly creates a sense of reality". Electronic Gaming Monthly praised the SNES version for having improved graphics and music over the Genesis version. They remarked that Flashback is slow-paced at times, but retains the player's interest through its compelling plot and involving puzzles. MegaTech magazine conceded that although there were "five big levels", finishing the game did not take very long. Nintendo Power praised the graphics, story and animation, calling it "almost cinematic" while noting that the play control takes "some getting used to".

Jim Trunzo reviewed Flashback: The Quest for Identity in White Wolf #38 (1993), giving the game a final evaluation of "Very Good" and stated that "Even gamers not including toward arcade entertainment will quickly become engrossed by Flashback. It's a tough but fair challenge. Players will grow fascinated as this sci-fi mystery unfolds screen by screen."

Electronic Gaming Monthly commented that the Sega CD version is "virtually identical" to the Genesis version, but that Flashback is still an essential purchase for those who do not already own a different version. GamePro, in contrast, argued that the reworked cutscenes "look so awesome that even gamers who've already completed this game on another platform will want to play it again just to see all the new CD footage". They also praised the addition of a CD-quality soundtrack and voices. A reviewer for Next Generation acknowledged that the Sega CD version makes considerable improvements, but argued that they are all standard cartridge-to-Sega CD enhancements which have no impact on the gameplay. However, he lauded Flashback itself for its graphics, animation and "fiendishly clever puzzles", and said that though the game superficially resembles Another World and Heart of the Alien, it is "in a class by itself that easily surpasses them". Entertainment Weekly similarly said that Flashback held up well, but that the Sega CD version's improvements seem less significant than its frequent load times. Reviewing the Jaguar version, GamePro noted that it was merely a straight port with no enhancements to take advantage of the hardware, but that "the game is no less enjoyable" than when it was first released to game consoles over a year before.

Next Generation reviewed the Macintosh version, praising the animation, story sequences, plot, level design, and longevity. Its 3DO review stated that "this title is still the same great game that we've been looking at for a couple of years. And one last note, the 3DO controller, for once, doesn't interfere (much) with the game's demanding control scheme."

Flashback was listed in the Guinness World Records as the best-selling French game of all time. The Mega Drive version became a bestseller.

In 1994, Mega placed the game at number eight of top Mega Drive games of all time. In 1997, Electronic Gaming Monthly listed the Genesis version as number 92 on its list of the "100 Best Games of All Time", calling it "a strong package that is fun to play even today. Flashback makes us feel like we're in that alien world, and with its lifelike animation and excellent moves, we can't help but love it." In February 2011, Wirtualna Polska ranked it as the 17th best Amiga game and the Polish edition of CHIP ranked it as the tenth best Amiga game. In 2004, readers of Retro Gamer voted Flashback as the 65th top retro game. In 1994, PC Gamer UK named Flashback the 17th best computer game of all time. The editors wrote, "Flashback proves that, when it comes to producing original, stylish and challenging games, there are few more adept than the French." IGN ranked the game 79th on their list of the "Top 100 SNES Games of All Time". In 2018, Complex listed the game 43rd in their "The Best Super Nintendo Games of All Time." In 1995, Total! placed the game 24th on their list of the "Top 100 SNES Games", lauding the rotoscoped graphics, which it said at the time were "the most realistic animation ever seen in a platformer". They also praised the combination of action and adventure-style puzzle challenges, summarizing: "The game itself is a [..] of an experience and the excellent plot also keeps the whole thing incredibly atmospheric." In the same year, Flux ranked Flashback tenth on its list of the "Top 100 Video Games". In 1996, GamesMaster listed the Mega Drive version 59th in its list of the "Top 100 Games of All Time".

== Legacy ==
A 2013 remake was released after being announced with a reveal trailer on 11 April 2013.

A sequel titled Fade to Black was produced by Delphine Software International in 1995 for the PC and PlayStation as a 3D game. A third game in the series, Flashback Legend, was in development by both Delphine Software International and Adeline Software International for a planned release in 2003, but was cancelled when the company went bankrupt and ceased operations at the end of 2002.

In early 2013, a game titled Flashback Origins was rumored to be in development, with the French website Gameblog stating that €300,000 of government funding had been granted to Cuisset's VectorCell in 2011.

In May 2021, Flashback 2 was announced for personal computers and multiple consoles. The game was developed by Microids, who did not specify how the game would be connected, if at all, to Fade to Black. The game was released on 16 November 2023 for the PlayStation 5, Windows, and Xbox Series X/S, with previous generation consoles receiving a release in early 2024. Flashback 2 begins in the middle of Conrad's adventure in the original Flashback, before the plot diverges from that of the original game.
