= Moto Racer Advance =

2002 motocross racing video game

- Developers: Adeline Software International; Delphine Software International
- Publisher: Ubi Soft
- Platform: Game Boy Advance
- Release: EU: October 4, 2002; NA: December 4, 2002
- Genre: Racing
- Modes: Single player, Multiplayer

Moto Racer Advance is a motocross racing game developed by Adeline Software International, produced by Delphine Software International and published by Ubisoft for the Game Boy Advance. It was released in 2002 in PAL regions on October 4 and in North America on December 4. It is part of the Moto Racer series and was the last game to be developed by Adeline Software and also the last with any involvement from Delphine Software.

Moto Racer Advance features several different modes, but much of it centers on a "Progression" mode, which requires the player to compete in races in a variety of environments. Multiplayer is supported through the link cable. Moto Racer Advance garnered positive reception from critics, noting its graphical quality and overall presentation as two of the main reasons for its success. IGN's Craig Harris called it one of the top racing games from 2002. As of 2009, Moto Racer Advance has received compilation scores of 86/100 and 83% on Metacritic and GameRankings respectively.

== Gameplay ==
The game uses both dirt roads and paved roads as tracks.

The player controls a motorcyclist and must try to win races on various terrain and settings. Each motorcycle in the game handles differently with some performing better on paved roads and others working better on rougher terrain.

There are a number of different modes: Grand Prix (GP), Motocross, and Traffic. GP takes place at a number of different locations across the world on paved tracks in places such as San Francisco and Russia. The paved tracks require the player to learn how to effectively use their brakes around corners. The GP courses contain small differences between them, giving more variety to the courses in the game. Motocross requires the player to drive on off-road terrain and to master the act of "powersliding" on corners. The courses found in Motocross races are less hospitable and often take place in arid and unkept locales and with obstacles. Traffic mixes both GP and Motocross, having mixed pavement courses and traffic on roads that serve as obstacles.

There are three different methods of gameplay: Championship, Progression, and Single Race. The single race mode must be earned through playing the progression mode. Progression is the game's "main mode" and places the player in a number of different tournaments and races in all three racing styles. It allows the player to earn hidden content, including new bikes which handle differently. The game contains link cable support for up to four players, provided that all four people own a copy of the game.

== Reception ==
Reception

Aggregate scores
Aggregator	Score
GameRankings	83%
Metacritic	86/100

Review scores
Publication	Score
GamePro	4.5/5
GameSpy	4.5/5
GameZone	7 of 10
IGN	9 of 10
Nintendo Power	3.1 out of 5
The Sydney Morning Herald	4/5

Moto Racer Advance was first displayed at the 2002 Electronic Entertainment Expo (E3). IGN gave the game two awards for portable games after its E3 2002 coverage: "Best Graphics" and "Best Racing Game". IGN praised the early version of the game for its high draw distance and smooth frame rate. The game was built from the ground up to be a racing game for the Game Boy Advance and to take advantage of the hardware offered by the system. IGN previewed the game six months before it was made available for retail and called the graphics the game's highlight, while noting that tune-ups in the physics engine were needed before release. The game manipulated 2D sprites and backgrounds to give the impression of 3D to the player. By keeping the core graphics engine simple, the game was able to contain elongated draw distances and a smooth frame rate.

Moto Racer Advance garnered positive reaction from critics for its graphics and gameplay; it received 86/100 and 83% ratings on review aggregate websites Metacritic and GameRankings, respectively. IGN's Craig Harris praised the smooth graphics engine of the game, noting that the designers had succeeded in creating a satisfying racing game for the Game Boy Advance. He called it one of the top racing games from 2002. The Sydney Morning Herald's Dan Toose praised the game's "smooth, minimalist graphics", while GameSpy's Steve Steinberg noted that the physics of the game felt "dead-on" and enjoyed the overall presentation of the game. GamePro's Vicious Sid was surprised by the game's long draw distance, calling it a technical feat on the Game Boy Advance. The sound design from the game received a mixed response from critics. GameZone's Code Cowboy stated that the Motocross bikes sounded "like gravel in a blender-- being chopped up". IGN noted otherwise, saying that the sound stayed to the background and was mostly pleasant, while The Sydney Morning Herald praised the realistic sound the bikes created. The game received Editors' Choice Awards from GameSpy, GamePro, and IGN. In a retrospective article, Moto Racer Advance was listed as the 6th-most "Forgotten Game Boy Advance classic" by PC Magazine's Benj Edwards.
