= Amy (video game) =

2012 video game

- Developer: VectorCell
- Publisher: Lexis Numérique
- Director: Paul Cuisset
- Engine: PhyreEngine
- Platforms: Xbox 360; PlayStation 3
- Release: WW: 11 January 2012
- Genres: Survival horror; stealth
- Mode: Single-player

Amy is a 2012 survival horror stealth video game developed by VectorCell and published by Lexis Numérique. It depicts the journey of Amy, an autistic child with supernatural powers, and her protector Lana. In a city suffering from a zombie-type infection which Amy is immune to (and can heal Lana from), Lana must stay near her young charge, for frequent healing, while protecting her from the infected, and the Phoenix Foundation who hopes to exploit her. Amy received negative critical reviews, due to its technical issues, controls, voice acting, and game design.

== Gameplay ==
The player controls Lana, the woman escorting Amy and protecting her as the two attempt to escape their disease-ridden town. They encounter monsters and the military, among other foes, in their attempt to escape. The player is forced to protect Amy from the zombies, often making her hide, to avoid detection. However, Lana starts succumbing to the plague without medicine, and thus must remain close to Amy, to return for healing. There are syringes infrequently, which allow Lana to heal without returning to Amy. However, when Lana is somewhat infected, she can safely walk past zombies, which necessitates a balance between healing and zombification. At certain times, Lana must rely on Amy for other abilities: Amy can use shockwaves, to push enemies and objects, causing distractions, as well as a sound bubble, muffling glass either being smashed or stepped on, defending Lana. Amy also hacks computers and climbs through vents when Lana needs her to.

== Plot ==
The player must escort Amy, an autistic eight-year-old as they try to get her out of a city overrun with wild creatures and enemies. Lana (Sabine Crossen) and Amy are traveling to a doctor in Silver City via train, when an explosion derails the train, and their plans. They discover that the people have been turned to monsters via a strange infection, and must escape the monsters, as they continue their journey to the city. They must also fend off the Phoenix Foundation, an organisation who intends to control Amy and exploit her strange powers.

== Development ==
On 3 April 2012, VectorCell announced a patch for Amy on the game's official Facebook page. The patch was released on 6 April. Major changes include the saving of the player's progress during chapters, the addition of more checkpoints, skipping of sequences in-game and several corrections to the subtitles.

== Reception ==
Reception

Aggregate score
Aggregator	Score	
Aggregator	PS3	Xbox 360
Metacritic	33/100	25/100

Review scores
Publication	Score	
Publication	PS3	Xbox 360
Destructoid	N/A	1.5/10
Edge	N/A	2/10
Electronic Gaming Monthly	3.5/10	N/A
Eurogamer	2/10	N/A
Game Informer	3/10	3/10
GameSpot	3/10	3/10
GameTrailers	N/A	3.9/10
GameZone	N/A	4.5/10
IGN	2/10	2/10
Joystiq	N/A	1.5/5
Official Xbox Magazine (US)	N/A	4/10
PlayStation: The Official Magazine	4/10	N/A
The Escapist	N/A	1.5/5
Metro UK	N/A	1/10

Amy received "generally unfavorable reviews" on both platforms according to the review aggregation website Metacritic. IGN's Colin Moriarty stated at the end of his review that he "spent at least a dozen hours with [Amy], got as far as the end portion of the fifth chapter, and gave up out of sheer anger and frustration." Game Informer's Jeff Cork stated that "as a downloadable title, I wasn't expecting [Amy] to measure up against the triple-A juggernauts of the survival horror genre. However, I was expecting a game that was at least playable and contained some kind of entertainment. Make no mistake: Whether [Amy] is delivered to you via download, retail SKU, direct brain wave, or retinal implant, it is terrible and should be avoided." James Stephanie Sterling of Destructoid went as far in their review as to describe Amy as "one of the worst games ever made". Ben "Yahtzee" Croshaw of The Escapist criticized the game's awkward camera views, poor optimization to Xbox, and also gave up the game in frustration due to the addition of poorly implemented stealth mechanics, and later stated that it was the worst game of 2012 and the second worst game of the entire 2010s behind Hunt Down the Freeman. The most positive PlayStation 3 review was given by Thomas Pichler from GamingXP. He praised the main protagonist, but criticized the periodical lack of explanation of what to do next. Alan Bradley of GamesRadar+ said Amy was boring and no fun to play and really unpleasant for most of the time. He also criticised the combination of a bad control system and widely spaced checkpoints that meant the player would have to repeat sections numerous times.

411Mania gave the Xbox 360 version a score of 3.3 out of 10 and said that it "tries to offer something new. The good news is that it does introduce some new gameplay concepts that can be toyed with by developers. The bad news, the controls and gameplay are implemented in such a way the game will just leave you frustrated and angry." Susan Arendt of The Escapist gave the same console version one-and-a-half stars out of five and stated, "Pick something to hate about videogames, and Amy has it. Graphics glitches, lousy design, repetitious gameplay, mushy controls, bad acting, horrible save system ... it's all there. The game's few good ideas simply aren't enough to suffer through the amount of crap surrounding them." The A.V. Club gave the same console version a D, saying, "Oddly, it is tempting to look forward to a second outing, however unlikely. Because videogame disasters this gruesome are fascinating. And, to be dangerously optimistic, Amy can't get much worse." Metro UK gave the same console version one out of ten, saying, "Awful in almost every possible aspect, this hugely disappointing download is not just a failure as a survival horror but as a video game." The Digital Fix gave the PlayStation 3 version a score of one out of ten, saying, "If you need to satiate your survival-horror appetite go revisit the Resident Evil series, Clock Tower or Parasite Eve as you will get much more interesting and developed games despite them being released over a decade ago."

It was included among the worst games of all time by GamesRadar+ in 2014 and in 2017.
