= Moto Racer DS =

2008 video game

- Developer: Artefacts Studio
- Publishers: EU: Nobilis; NA: SouthPeak Games
- Platform: Nintendo DS
- Release: EU: November 28, 2008; NA: July 3, 2010
- Genre: Racing
- Modes: Single player, Multiplayer

Moto Racer DS is an arcade style motorcycle racing game developed by French company Artefacts Studio and published by SouthPeak Games for the Nintendo DS. It is the first game to be released in the Moto Racer series since 2002.

The game features a number of different modes, but a large portion of the game centers on the "Moto GP" mode, in which the player competes against the AI in a number of different races on a variety of terrain.

== Gameplay ==
The top screen of the Nintendo DS shows the race and the player's motorcyclist, while the bottom screen shows a map with the player's location on the track.

In Moto Racer DS, the player races motorcycles in various settings in order to complete the game. The game has races on both dirt and paved roads, and contains a number of different game modes: Moto GP, Traffic, Supercross, and Freestyle. Moto GP makes up the core of the game, where the player races against the computer in a series of different races on pavement. A championship mode inside of Moto GP places the player in a tournament where to advance, they are required to place at a certain level. Multiple people can play each other in races through the multiplayer function in Moto GP.

Traffic places the player on a busy street with oncoming traffic and tasks the player with making it around the circuit without hitting any of the cars on the road. A multiplayer version of Traffic pits two players against each other on the same track to see who can maneuver through traffic better. Freestyle requires the player to perform a series of motorcycle tricks in order to earn points and advance to the next level. Supercross forces the player to drive motorcycles on a dirt track in order to perform tricks.

== Reception ==
Reception

Aggregate scores
Aggregator	Score
GameRankings	74.50%
Metacritic	73/100

Review scores
Publication	Score
Nintendo Life	7/10
Official Nintendo Magazine	79%

Moto Racer DS received positive reception from critics, who noted its extensive content as its main factor for success; it received a score of 74.50% from GameRankings and 73 out of 100 from Metacritic. NintendoLife's Adam Scott Clark felt that it was a successful game for those interested in motorcycle video games, but suggested that more casual racing fans would be turned off by the game's difficult learning curve and suggested Mario Kart DS as a viable alternative. Pocket Gamer thought that the game had a few hitches, but noted that the game still had an excellent amount of content and that its side effects were mostly due to the game's attempts to be more of a simulation racing game.
