= Fade to Black (video game) =

1995 action-adventure video game

- Cover art drawn by Jean Giraud
- Developer: Delphine Software International
- Publisher: Electronic Arts
- Director: Paul Cuisset
- Designer: Paul Cuisset
- Programmers: Philippe Chastel; Sébastien Clement; Guillaume Genty; Claude Levastre; Alain Ramond; Alain Tinarrage; Benoît Verillaud
- Artist: Thierry Perreau
- Composer: Raphaël Gesqua
- Platforms: MS-DOS, PlayStation
- Release: MS-DOS; EU: 1995; NA: 31 August 1995; PlayStation; NA: 28 June 1996; EU: July 1996; JP: 2 May 1997
- Genre: Action-adventure
- Mode: Single-player

Fade to Black is a 1995 action-adventure game developed by Delphine Software International and published by Electronic Arts. It is the sequel to the 1992 video game Flashback. The game was released for MS-DOS with full Gouraud-shaded 3D graphics, and PlayStation with fully textured 3D.

== Gameplay ==
Fade to Black is a 3D action-adventure game with a third-person view from behind the character's back. It features gun combat with a number of platforming sequences.

== Plot ==
Intelligence agent Conrad Hart has been lying adrift in space in suspended animation for 50 years after he destroyed the home planet of a hostile alien race called Morphs. (Note: As depicted in Flashback.) In 2190, he is found by a Morph patrol and imprisoned in the Lunar prison of New Alcatraz. There, Conrad is freed by a man named John O'Conner, who remotely guides him through the complex. Conrad escapes New Alcatraz and meets John, whereupon he learns that John is a member of Mandragore, an organized resistance movement that opposes the occupation of Earth by the surviving Morphs years before.

Conrad and John teleport to Shadow, the Mandragore homebase, moments before Morph pursuers destroy their ship. There, Conrad meets resistance leader Sarah Smith and Commander Hank. Sarah enlists Conrad's help to rescue an eminent Earth scientist, Professor Bergstein, who is being held prisoner in Morph asteroid base D321. Conrad eventually finds Bergstein, who tells him that the base contains the Morph's new mind-manipulating weapon. Using a computer virus handed to him by Bergstein, Conrad sabotages the computer core and escapes with Bergstein, causing the base to explode along with the asteroid itself. He is then sent to a mining facility on Mars and retrieves the coordinates to a Morph station orbiting Venus, where he rescues an incorporeal being called Ageer.

Ageer tells Conrad that he and his people, an extinct alien race from Pluto referred to as the "Ancients", can lead the Mandragore to victory but, to do so, they must first find the oracle of the Ancients. They travel to Pluto and eventually find the oracle, who leads Conrad to an artifact called the Pyramid. Conrad activates the Pyramid, which relates the story of the Ancients to him. Long ago, the Ancients peacefully welcomed the Morphs, who in turn invaded Pluto and attacked their civilization, prompting the Ancients to merge their souls into the Pyramid.

A Morph mothership arrives on Pluto and steals the Pyramid. Ageer teleports Conrad aboard the mothership where the Pyramid is being held. Upon reaching the upper levels of the Mothership, he sees John before the Master Brain, an organism governing the Morphs. John reveals himself as a shapeshifting Morph creature, the Super Morph, who had disguised itself to infiltrate Shadow and plant an active detonation device. Conrad frees the Pyramid and flees back to Shadow as it is attacked by the Morphs. He fights his way through the Morphs to the command room, where Hank tells him that Sarah has the code to disable the detonation device, but she has been taken hostage by a Morph. Conrad gets to the base dormitory and saves Sarah, who gives him the code before teleporting away.

After disabling the device, Conrad joins Sarah, Hank and Ageer in planning a counterattack. With the aid of the Ancients, Mandragore have located on Earth the Master Brain that controls the Solar System. Conrad and Sarah teleport to Easter Island, where they separate. Conrad eventually finds the Master Brain and releases the Pyramid, which engages in telepathic combat with the Master Brain and defeats it. Conrad flees and finds the Super Morph attacking Sarah. He runs to a nearby spaceship, with Sarah if he has managed to rescue her. (Note: Depending on the player's actions.) The Super Morph gives chase but is killed by the turbines of the spaceship as it escapes the exploding Easter Island to rejoin Mandragore on Shadow.

== Development ==
Shortly after the release of Flashback in 1992, the development team started work on a similar sequel titled Morphs: Flashback 2 for the Sega CD. Work on the game spanned 3–4 months, however, the project was put on hold while they focused on finishing Shaq Fu (1994). By the time they returned to the project, the Sega CD was no longer seen as a viable platform, so it was scrapped in favor of restarting on PC, which turned into the 3D shooter Fade to Black The idea of doing a 3D sequel to Flashback started in 1993. The game was originally announced under the title "Crossfire". Conrad's animations were created using motion capture.

A Sega Saturn version was also projected and tasked to developer Virtual Studio to be converted from the PlayStation version, but the deal fell through when they were reallocated to do the Sega Saturn version of Time Commando instead, a game by Delphine Software International's sister company Adeline Software International. Estimated to have been released in December 1996, since no workaround plan was devised to cover up the shift of development and take the game to Sega's console after, this decision effectively cancelled it altogether.

== Reception ==
Reception

Review scores
Publication	Score
AllGame	3.5/5 (PS1); 3/5 (PC)
Electronic Gaming Monthly	8 out of 10 (PS1)
Next Generation	4/5 (PS1)
PCMag	2/4
PC Games	A−

Award
Publication	Award
PC Games	Game of the Month

The PlayStation version was a best-seller in the United Kingdom, where it was among the nineteen best-selling PlayStation games of 1996 according to HMV. It sold enough copies to go Platinum.

Fade to Black received a moderately positive critical response. Electronic Gaming Monthly gave the PlayStation version their "Game of the Month" award. Rating it two out of four stars, PC Magazine praised the storyline, level design, and combination of adventure and action gaming, but disliked the "incredibly disorienting" automatic camera-view changes and complex controls.

Reviewers generally criticized the game's steep difficulty and blocky polygon models, but praised the background graphics and animations, and generally concluded that the game's close blend of action and puzzling in a 3D environment was a success.

Fade to Black was named the 29th best computer game ever by PC Gamer UK in 1997. The editors called it "an adrenaline-pumping polygon adventure" and "an intriguing game". In 1996, GamesMaster ranked the PlayStation version 50th on their "Top 100 Games of All Time."

== Cancelled sequel ==
Flashback Legend was an unfinished second sequel of Flashback. It was in co-development by Delphine Software International and Adeline Software International for a planned release in 2003. As opposed to Fade to Black, it was going to be a 2D side-scroller game, like Flashback, but without non-scrolling areas. It was targeted exclusively for the Game Boy Advance. The game was cancelled when Delphine went bankrupt and ceased operations in the end of 2002. However, a prototype ROM, dated 21 June 2002, was leaked and spread over the Internet at some point. It features all 16 levels with minor glitches and one music track, which is a compressed tune from Fade to Black. Despite multi-language options the beta can only be played in French with an English pause menu, but can be played in English via a fan-made patch.
