= Among the Living (2014 film) =

2014 French horror film

- French poster
- Directed by: Julien Maury; Alexandre Bustillo
- Written by: Alexandre Bustillo; Julien Maury
- Produced by: Fabrice Lambot; Caroline Piras; Jean-Pierre Putters
- Starring: Béatrice Dalle; Anne Marivin; Nicolas Giraud
- Cinematography: Antoine Sanier
- Edited by: Sébastien de Sainte Croix
- Music by: Raphaël Gesqua
- Production companies: Metaluna Productions; SND Films
- Distributed by: Tanzi Distribution
- Release dates: 10 March 2014 (SXSW); 30 April 2014 (France)
- Running time: 90 minutes
- Country: France
- Language: French

Among the Living (French: Aux yeux des vivants) is a 2014 French horror film written and directed by Julien Maury and Alexandre Bustillo. The film had its world premiere on 10 March 2014 at South by Southwest and follows three young boys who discover that the seemingly banal exterior of their town hides a horrific inner secret.

== Plot ==
Three young adolescent friends decide that they want to start their summer vacation early, so they decide to skip the last day of school in favor of having a little fun. Their adventures that day get them into a little trouble, which causes them to wander to an abandoned film studio lot on the edge of town called Blackwood Studios. The young boys are horrified when they see a man in a clown mask dragging a chained woman across the lot. They manage to flee and try to get the police involved, only for the police to assume that because the adolescents are only causing more trouble. The adolescents end up going back to their respective homes, unaware that the masked man and his father are planning on taking their revenge on the three friends.

== Cast ==
- Béatrice Dalle as Jeanne Faucheur
- Anne Marivin as Julia
- Nicolas Giraud as Nathan
- Francis Renaud as Isaac Faucheur
- Chloé Coulloud as Mila
- Zacharie Chasseriaud as Tom
- Damien Ferdel as Dan
- Théo Fernandez as Victor
- Fabien Jegoudez as Klarence
- Sidwell Weber

== Production ==
Bustillo and Maury first announced plans to film Among the Living in 2012 and filming was expected to begin in southwest France in spring 2013. Funding for the film was raised through a successful crowdsourcing campaign. Filming began in June 2013 and a trailer for the film was released in March 2014.

== Reception ==
Marc Savlov of The Austin Chronicle called the film "a bloody good capstone" for nouveau guignol cinema, and went on to say that it was "by turns sublime, comical, and chilling in the blackest sort of way." Ryan Turek of Coming Soon responded positively to Among the Living, writing, "The film isn't too deep on a subtextual level, but it's a solid exercise in pure terror." After attending a theatrical screening of the film, Zach Gayne of Screen Anarchy offered high praise to Among the Living, writing, "The tension in Among The Living is so thick that it spawned collective coping mechanisms, wherein neighboring strangers locked eyes when they couldn't bear to look at the screen any longer." While Evan Dickson of Bloody Disgusting criticized the film's "somewhat lurching" first half, he went to praise its "utterly insane and effective last act." Writing for Fangoria magazine, Samuel Zimmerman gave Among the Living a score of 2½ out of 4, offering praise to its unsettling villain and the "thoroughly punishing use of violence" that the film employed when it finally "shifts gears into full-on slasher territory."

Chris Bumbray of Arrow in the Head found that while the film was "skillfully made" it was also "nothing particularly special, and a fairly dull slasher flick." Dread Central's Debi Moore had a lukewarm response to the film, giving it a score 2/5 and writing, "Among the Living is technically as good as can be expected from two directors with a superior vision but falls over badly with its narrative of unlikable protagonists, uninventive villains and a reluctance to push the limits as much as it seems to want to." Drew Taylor of IndieWire lambasted the film, opining that it was "straight up bad" before succinctly concluding, "It's messy, it's gory without ever being gratifying, and it makes absolutely no sense."
