= Julien Maury and Alexandre Bustillo =

French film director duo

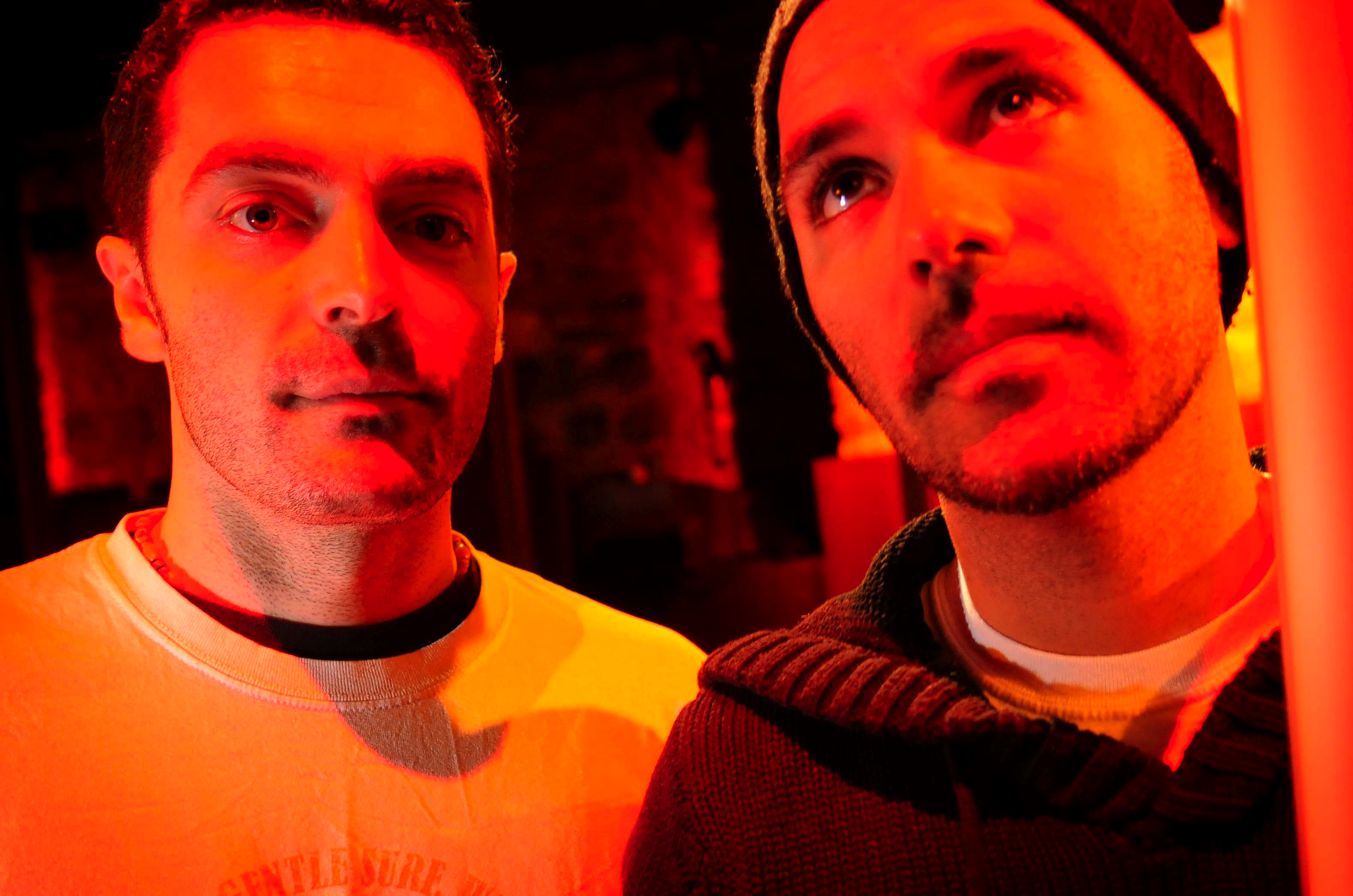
- Julien Maury and Alexandre Bustillo in 2011
- Born: 10 March 1975; age 50-51 (Bustillo); 1978; age 48-49 (Maury); Saint-Cloud, France (Bustillo); Paris, France (Maury)
- Occupation: Filmmakers
- Years active: 2007–present

Julien Maury (born 1978 in Paris) and Alexandre Bustillo (born 1975 in Saint-Cloud, France) are French filmmakers who work together on their projects. They are known for their work in the horror genre, and list their influences as Dario Argento, Roman Polanski, Clive Barker and John Carpenter.

== Life and career ==
Julien Maury graduated from l’École Supérieure de Réalisation Audiovisuelle. He worked for French television before directing documentaries, music videos and short films. Alexandre Bustillo graduated from Université Paris XIII with an M.A. in cinema, before working as a journalist for several magazines including Mad Movies. The two met each other through a mutual friend.

Their first feature, Inside (2007), emerged during the resurgence of French horror in the early twenty-first century and served as a springboard for their subsequent work in the genre.

After the success of Inside, Maury and Bustillo were attached to at separate times to Halloween II, the sequel to Rob Zombie's remake of John Carpenter's Halloween as well as the remake for Clive Barker's Hellraiser. In both cases, they left the project.

Their subsequent film Livid was released 2011. The film was initially intended to be Bustillo and Maury's English-language debut and shot in the United Kingdom but they moved to a lower-budget French production after they found that they were losing creative control over their story.

== Filmography ==
=== Feature films ===
Year	Title	Credited as		Notes
Year	Title	Directors	Writers	Notes
2007	Inside	Yes	Yes	Won the "Carnet Jove Jury Award", the "Citizen Kane Award for Best Directorial Revelation" and the "Grand Prize of European Fantasy Film in Silver" at the Sitges Film Festival
2011	Livid	Yes	Yes	
2014	Among the Living	Yes	Yes	
2016	Inside	No	Original writers	
2017	Leatherface	Yes	No	
2020	Kandisha	Yes	Yes	
2021	The Deep House	Yes	Yes	
2024	The Soul Eater	Yes	No	

=== Short films ===
Year	Title	Credited as		Notes
Year	Title	Directors	Writers	Notes
2003	Pizza Hunt	Yes	Yes	Maury only; also credited as cinematographer and producer
2005	Pedro's Adventures	Yes	Yes	Maury only; also credited as cinematographer and producer
2014	X Is for Xylophone	Yes	Yes	Segment from ABCs of Death 2
