= Shaq Fu =

1994 video game

- North American Genesis cover art
- Developer: Delphine Software International (Note: Game Boy version developed by Tiertex Design Studios; Amiga version developed by The Dome Software Developments; Game Gear version developed by Unexpected Development.)
- Publishers: Electronic Arts: Genesis/Mega Drive, Game Gear Electronic Arts Super NES; NA: Electronic Arts; EU: Ocean Software Game Boy Black Pearl Software Amiga Ocean Software
- Designer: Paul Cuisset
- Composer: Raphaël Gesqua
- Platforms: Genesis/Mega Drive, Super NES, Game Boy, Amiga, Game Gear
- Release: October 28, 1994: Genesis/Mega Drive, Super NES; NA/EU: October 28, 1994 Game Boy; NA: October 1995 Amiga; EU: 1995 Game Gear; NA: 1995
- Genre: Fighting
- Modes: Single-player, multiplayer

Shaq Fu is a 1994 fighting game developed by Delphine Software International and published by Electronic Arts for the Sega Genesis and Super Nintendo Entertainment System. Versions for the Game Gear, Game Boy, and Amiga followed in 1995. Professional basketball player Shaquille O'Neal is the player character.

Shaq Fu was met with mixed responses from critics upon release, though it has since come to be considered one of the worst video games ever made. A sequel, Shaq Fu: A Legend Reborn, was released in 2018.

== Plot ==
In the game's storyline, Shaquille O'Neal walks into a dojo while heading to a charity basketball game in Tokyo, Japan. After speaking with Leotsu, a martial arts master, Shaq is mistaken for a warrior chosen by the Stars and goes to another dimension, the Second World, where he must rescue a young boy named Nezu from the evil mummy Sett-Ra. After defeating Sett-Ra and his minions, Shaq rescues Nezu and returns to his original world in time for his game. However, he finds Beast, one of Sett-Ra's minions, has somehow entered his world and is now playing for the opposing team in order to get a rematch with Shaq.

== Development ==
After Shaquille O'Neal was signed on to appear in a video game for publisher Electronic Arts, the EA staff were inspired to put him in a fighting game because they had heard of O'Neal's interest in martial arts.

== Ports ==
Shaq fighting Auroch, one of the characters excluded from the SNES version

The Genesis version of Shaq Fu has five more playable characters (Auroch, Colonel, Diesel, Leotsu, and Nezu) and three more stages (The Lab, The Wasteland, and Yasko Mines) than the Super NES version, thus the Genesis version has a longer story mode. The North Gate/South Gate stage is accessible in the SNES version with a cheat code, whereas the Genesis version has the North Gate/South Gate stage available by default. The Amiga version contains the same content as the Genesis version (it keeps the text "Licensed by Sega Enterprises, LTD" left over from that version on the title screen), though the backgrounds have no animation. It also only has three tunes; there is no background music during the fights.

The Game Boy version has the same seven characters as the Super NES version, whereas the Game Gear version only has six characters (Shaq, Leotsu, Mephis, Rajah, Kaori, and Sett Ra). Both the Game Boy and Game Gear versions lack a tournament mode and in-game voices.

Both the Genesis and SNES versions of the game contain a hidden button sequence that initiates a "blood code" in the spirit of Mortal Kombat. The blood effects are subdued and minor, which kept the game at its "MA-13" (known by modern rating standard as "T") rating, but the blood code gives access to finishing moves that are triggered by striking the opponent in a certain way to end the match.

== Reception ==
Reception

Review scores
Publication	Score	
Publication	Sega Genesis	SNES
Electronic Gaming Monthly	6/10 4/10	N/A
GamesMaster	81%	83%
Mean Machines Sega	79%	N/A
Next Generation	2/5	N/A

Shaq Fu received mixed reviews at the time of its release. GamePro gave the SNES version a positive review, saying that the unusually small size of the sprites is balanced out by the incredibly fast game speed. They also praised the "ultra sharp" controls and impressive digitized graphics. They reviewed the Genesis version as superior to the SNES version due to its additional characters and improved controls, and concluded that the game is "fun once you get used to the small, fast sprites". As Next Generation reviewed the Genesis version, "Shaq Fu includes everything a good fighting game needs, with the exception of good fighting". In contrast to their positive reactions to the SNES and Genesis versions, GamePro panned the Game Boy release, saying it dumbs down the gameplay, loses so much graphical detail that the characters are unrecognizable, and makes the music far too pervasive.

Retrospective criticism of the game has been generally negative. GameTrailers rated it number 4 Worst in their "Top Ten Best and Worst Video Games". In the September 1997, Nintendo Power had 12 staff members vote in a list for the top 100 games of all time. This list also included a 10 worst games of all-time list voted by the staff, which placed Shaq Fu at 3rd worst place on their list. The article stated that it was "not possible to come up with a worse idea than this". The same year, Electronic Gaming Monthly ranked it number 10 on their "Top 10 Worst Games of All Time". In response to the negative feedback to the game, Levi Buchanan from IGN stated it was undeserved as a result of collective exaggerations.

== Sequel ==
A sequel, Shaq Fu: A Legend Reborn, was released on June 5, 2018, for Microsoft Windows, Nintendo Switch, PlayStation 4, Xbox One, iOS and Android.

== See also ==
- Barkley Shut Up and Jam!
- Michael Jordan: Chaos in the Windy City
- Slam City with Scottie Pippen
- List of video games notable for negative reception
