= Moto Racer 3 =

2001 video game

- European cover art
- Developer: Delphine Software International
- Publishers: EU: Electronic Arts; NA: Infogrames
- Platform: Microsoft Windows
- Release: EU: 7 December 2001; NA: 31 January 2002
- Genre: Racing
- Modes: Single-player, multiplayer

Moto Racer 3 is an arcade style motorcycle racing game developed by Delphine Software International for Microsoft Windows. It is part of the Moto Racer series and is the sequel to Moto Racer 2.

Moto Racer 3 expands on the offerings found in Moto Racer 2, having more types of races including multiplayer online play.

== Gameplay ==
Moto Racer 3 uses different types of terrain in its races, including pavement.

The player controls a motorcyclist in races on various terrain. The game does not have a career mode, but instead contains many race modes: speed, Supercross/Motocross, Freestyle, Trial, and Traffic. Speed mode places the player in courses with long straights and slight curves, in order to allow the driver to reach the high speeds. The courses in the mode are set so the player can gain speed. Supercross/Motocross uses dirt tracks with hills in races designed to make driving difficult. Freestyle gives the player a time-limit to perform as many tricks as possible for points. Trial mode requires the player to maneuver an obstacle course on a motorcycle. Traffic mode is a race between two participants in the streets of Paris requiring the player to avoid oncoming traffic.

Each event the player completes earns the player points towards unlocking new courses and motorcycles. The game contains support for online play.

== History ==
A year before the release of Moto Racer 3, Infogrames bought out the North American publishing rights, while Electronic Arts retained the European rights. On August 8, 2001, Infogrames revealed the game for the first time; GameSpot noted the improved graphics from its predecessor. IGN praised the game's graphics as being photo-realistic after seeing gameplay footage at an Electronic Arts Europe event.

== Reception ==
Reception

Aggregate scores
Aggregator	Score
GameRankings	69.07%
Metacritic	66/100

Review scores
Publication	Score
GameSpot	7.2/10
GameSpy	70%
GameZone	5.5/10
IGN	6.9/10
PC Gamer (US)	52%
PC Zone	74%

Moto Racer 3 garnered mediocre reviews from critics for its confusing menu system and unpolished feel; it received compilation scores of 69.07% and 66/100 on review aggregate websites GameRankings and Metacritic, respectively. GameSpy's Craig Wessel noted that the physics engine of the game was perfect for casual players and praised the game's various modes. However, he did not like the options control, questioning why the player has to edit the game before starting it up to adjust the game's controls. IGN's Dan Adams felt that the game didn't give any incentive for players enough to play through the entire game. GameSpot's Gord Goble criticized the game's low frame rate, but praised the variety of events.
