= Moto Racer 4 =

2016 video game

- Developer: Artefacts Studio
- Publisher: Microïds
- Director: Paul Cuisset
- Engine: Unreal Engine 4
- Platforms: Microsoft Windows macOS; Nintendo Switch; PlayStation 4 Xbox One
- Release: Microsoft Windows, macOS: WW: 3 November 2016; PlayStation 4, Xbox One: EU: 3 November 2016; NA: 24 January 2017; Nintendo Switch: WW: 20 November 2018
- Genre: Racing
- Modes: Single-player, multiplayer

Moto Racer 4 is a racing video game developed by Artefacts Studio and published by Microïds for Microsoft Windows, macOS, Nintendo Switch, PlayStation 4 and Xbox One.

== Reception ==
Reception

Aggregate score
Aggregator	Score
Metacritic	(PC) 47/100 (PS4) 49/100 (XONE) 59/100

Moto Racer 4 received "generally unfavorable" reviews, according to review aggregator website Metacritic.
