= Inside (2007 film) =

2007 French horror film

- Film poster
- French: À l'intérieur
- Directed by: Julien Maury; Alexandre Bustillo
- Written by: Alexandre Bustillo
- Produced by: Vérane Frédiani; Franck Ribièrer
- Starring: Béatrice Dalle; Alysson Paradis
- Cinematography: Laurent Barès
- Edited by: Baxter
- Music by: François-Eudes Chanfrault
- Production companies: BR Films; La Fabrique de Films
- Distributed by: La Fabrique de Films
- Release date: June 13, 2007 (France)
- Running time: 82 minutes
- Country: France
- Language: French
- Budget: $2.5 million
- Box office: $530,000

Inside (French: À l'intérieur) is a 2007 French horror film directed by Julien Maury and Alexandre Bustillo in their directorial debut, written by Bustillo, and starring Béatrice Dalle and Alysson Paradis. The plot focuses on a mourning widow on the verge of giving birth, who is attacked in her home by a mysterious intruder on Christmas Eve.

The film was theatrically released in France on June 13, 2007, and received positive reviews from film critics, with some citing it as part of the New French Extremity movement.

== Plot ==
On Christmas Eve, four months after expectant mother Sarah Scarangella survives a car crash that kills her husband, she makes final preparations for her delivery the following day. Her baby is overdue. Still reeling from her husband's death, Sarah has grown moody and depressed. She turns down her mother's request to stay with her for the night and has asked her employer Jean-Pierre to take her to the hospital for her eventual delivery.

That evening, a mysterious, unidentified woman arrives at Sarah's door, asking to use the telephone to call for help. Sarah lies that her husband is sleeping and she does not want to be disturbed, but the woman tells her that she knows that he is dead. When the visitor persists on coming in, Sarah, a professional photographer, attempts to take her photo through a window and telephones the police. When they arrive, the woman has already vanished. The police assure Sarah that she will be fine, arranging to have a patrol car visit throughout the night.

Upon developing her photos, Sarah recognizes the woman in the background of an earlier photo she had taken, indicating she was stalking Sarah. Sarah telephones Jean-Pierre, asking to have the photos enhanced. As she goes to bed, the woman arrives in the bedroom, awakening Sarah with scissors puncturing her pregnant belly. Sarah fights the visitor off (who slashes part of Sarah's face with the scissors) and locks herself in the bathroom, where the woman tries to gain entry. The woman makes clear that her intentions are to take Sarah's child for herself.

Jean-Pierre arrives, and not knowing what Sarah's mother looks like, takes the woman's word that she is the mother. Not long after her actual mother Louise arrives, arousing his suspicion. Louise heads upstairs to check on her daughter. Believing her to be the attacker, Sarah accidentally kills Louise by stabbing a needle into her neck. Jean-Pierre is later stabbed to death by the intruder. The police arrive to check up on her with a prisoner in tow. Not knowing what Sarah looks like, the police take the woman's word that she is Sarah and everything is fine. As they are about to leave, the police realize the woman who answered the door was not pregnant and return to the home. The first officer is stabbed to death with knitting needles as he attempts to arrest the attacker. The second is shot in the back of the head as he attempts to help Sarah. The attacker turns off the power as the third enters, waiting until they go to turn it back on before shooting the officer and stabbing his prisoner in the head.

Sarah confronts the woman, and both injure each other with various household appliances. Sarah points a sewing needle at her own stomach, and the woman knocks her to the ground. Sarah manages to burn off half of the woman's face with an aerosol container and cigarette. The woman flees, and after being cornered by Sarah, reveals that she was the other driver in the car accident, which killed her unborn baby. She wants Sarah's baby as a replacement.

Before anything else can happen or be said, the two are interrupted by the revival of the third police officer; having been shot in close proximity by the woman with his riot gun, he survived the attack but is now disoriented and blinded. He confuses Sarah with her attacker and beats her in the stomach with his club, forcing her water to break. The woman comes to Sarah's aid and kills the officer with the rod of a shower curtain; Sarah, now lying on the stairs, has begun to give birth and the baby is stuck. The woman performs the Caesarean section on Sarah with scissors, saving the infant but killing Sarah in the process. The woman then sits in a chair and begins rocking the baby, who briefly cries, as she looks at Sarah, who lies dead on the steps.

== Cast ==
- Béatrice Dalle as La Femme
- Alysson Paradis as Sarah Scarangella
- Nathalie Roussel as Louise Scarangella, Sarah's mother
- François-Régis Marchasson as Jean-Pierre Montalban
- Jean-Baptiste Tabourin as Matthieu
- Dominique Frot as The Nurse
- Claude Lulé as The Doctor
- Hyam Zaytoun as Policewoman
- Tahar Rahim as Policeman #1
- Emmanuel Guez as Policeman #2
- Ludovic Berthillot as BAC Policeman #1
- Emmanuel Lanzi as BAC Policeman #2
- Nicolas Duvauchelle as BAC Policeman #3
- Aymen Saïdi as Abdel

== Production ==
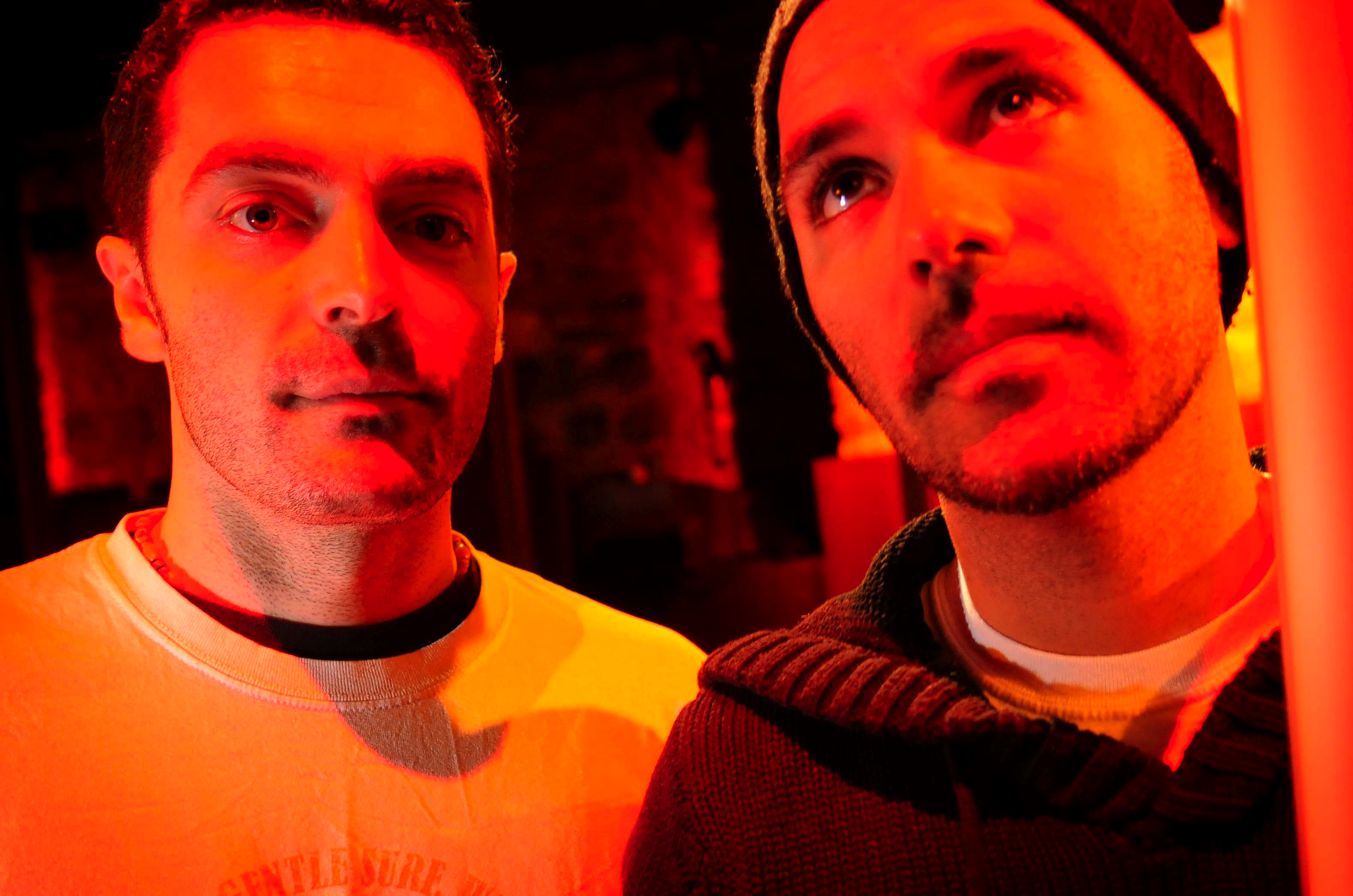
Directors Julien Maury and Alexandre Bustillo

Julien Maury and Alexandre Bustillo met each other through a mutual friend. After the meeting, Bustillo sent Maury a first draft of the script and Maury sent over some short films that he had worked on in the past. Bustillo said the premise was inspired by a pregnant friend who lived alone in a small suburban house; he imagined what might happen if a killer approached her while she was alone. Part of the film was shot at the Domaine des Gâtines in Plaisir, Yvelines, which was selected for its isolated setting. According to Maury, "The first idea with the story was to change the sex of the killer. In horror movies it’s always a guy chasing after young girls; it’s one of the clichés of the genre. So the first main idea was changing the identity of the bad guy. We wondered what was the motivation for a woman to hunt another woman?" In a 2011 interview with Collider, Bustillo noted that Inside was "a slasher movie made in a sort of American style" in contrast to his and Maury's subsequent film, Livid, which Bustillo described as "a lurid fairy tale and very European". The film was given a budget of 1.7 million Euros.

== Release ==
Inside was selected for the 2007 International Critics' Week at the Cannes Film Festival. It was released theatrically in France on 13 June 2007.

=== Home media ===
Inside was released on DVD in France by Pathé Vidéo on 20 February 2008. The two-disc edition included an audio commentary by directors Julien Maury and Alexandre Bustillo, a making-of documentary, interviews and short films. In the United States, the film was released on an unrated DVD under the Dimension Extreme label on 15 April 2008. Momentum Pictures released the film on DVD in the United Kingdom on 12 October 2009.

On 5 February 2024, Second Sight Films released Inside on Blu-ray in the United Kingdom, in standard and limited editions. The releases featured newly recorded audio commentaries and interviews with the directors, actress Alysson Paradis, producer Franck Ribière and members of the production crew. The limited edition additionally included a 70-page book of essays and six art cards. In France, ESC Éditions released a Blu-ray and bonus DVD edition on 24 April 2024, featuring archival supplements including a making-of documentary, interviews and an audio commentary.

=== Critical response ===
On the review-aggregation website Rotten Tomatoes, 88% of critics have given the film a positive review based on 16 reviews, with an average rating of 7.80 out of 10.

Nathan Lee of The Village Voice found the film to be a "nasty number" that was both "repellent" and "uncompromising" while Harry Knowles of Ain't It Cool News called it "off the hook awesome" and "a traumatically entertaining experience." Jason Buchanon of AllMovie gave the film a score of 4/5, and called it "a pitch-perfect balance of grinding tension and inventive gore" while John Fallon of Arrow in the Head gave it a perfect score of 10/10, and deemed it "a real horror film; character driven, suspenseful as hell, smarter than the norm and gory as fuck." Brad Miska of Bloody Disgusting gave Inside a top score of 5/5, labeling it "one of the scariest movies I have ever seen in my life" before concluding, "This is quite possibly the most violent, realistic and bloody slasher film ever assembled, ending on such a gut-wrenching note that there's not a single person who could walk out of that theater feeling normal." Bloody Disgusting later ranked the film twelfth in their list of the Top 20 Horror Films of the Decade, with the article saying, "One of the most audacious, brutal, unrelenting horror films ever made, Inside is perhaps the crown jewel of the new wave of extreme French horror films."

Inside was called "the most visceral slasher film of all time" by Steve Barton of Dread Central, who awarded the film a score of 4½ out of a possible 5 and wrote, "The film may be cruel, but it's executed with pure artistry. Haunting images carry their own grotesque beauty and there is real emotional depth anchored by a pair of powerhouse performances from the dueling ladies." Inside was deemed an "excellently paced suspense movie" by Kevin Carr of Film School Rejects while Adrian Halen of Horror News praised it as "an amazing film" that "no self-respecting horror fan should go without seeing." Sarah Gopaul of Popjournalism found Inside to be "a gut-wrenching exhibition of intensity and gore, propelled by strong performances from Dalle and Paradis." Steve Dollar of The New York Sun opined that the "darkly stylish and shockingly violent" film was the "essence of grindhouse" and "one of the most edge-of-the-seat, fingers-over-the-eyes flicks in recent memory."

While Scott Tobias of The A.V. Club admitted that Inside was "a superb piece of horror craftsmanship" that was stylish, intense, and nerve-jangling, he criticized its frequent cutaways to the protagonist's in utero child, writing, "Where Inside crosses the line is a visual device that periodically checks the baby's status as it sloshes around the uterus, like a CGI ultrasound. Sometimes it's as peaceful-looking as the star baby in 2001; at other times, after a scuffle or a blow, it's tossed about so violently that its survival is in question. While I recognize that no digital fetuses were harmed during the making of Inside, there's something unseemly and grossly manipulative about treating the baby like some helpless variation on the "Final girl" in a Halloween knockoff." Kim Newman had a lukewarm response to the film, offering praise to its unsettling and "quietly intense" first half while criticizing its descent into "gory farce" for its finale, writing, "Designed to provoke extreme responses, Inside is conceptually among the most horrific movies ever made. In execution, it surprisingly lets the audience off the suspense hook to go for CGI-assisted ketchup-sloshing in the almost cheerful Herschell Gordon Lewis manner rather than the nerve-stretching, you-can't-watch-this approach of, say, Gaspar Noé."

In 2025, the British Film Institute included Inside in its list of "10 great French horror films".

== Accolades ==
At the 2007 Sitges Film Festival, Inside won the award for Best Makeup Effects. It also received the Carnet Jove Jury Award for Best Fantàstic Film and the Silver Méliès for Best European Film, while Maury and Bustillo received the Citizen Kane Award for directorial revelation.

== Remake ==
Hollywood has shown interest in remaking the film; Maury and Bustillo were propositioned but both turned it down.

Jaume Balagueró, the director of REC, told Fangoria that he may be directing the remake in the future and that it would "accent the terror of the pregnancy situation more than the gore".

In 2009, Maury mentioned that there had been some problems with the rights and the project was delayed. Furthermore, he was unsure if Balagueró's was still attached to the project; "For us this was really like a dream because we are big fans of Balagueró’s movies. For the first time it wasn’t the case of a newbie making the movie of a big director, it was the exact opposite where a huge director is making the film of two poor French guys. So we were proud of that."

In 2015, it was announced that the remake was back in production with Miguel Ángel Vivas, known for directing Kidnapped, set to direct. The remake was completed in 2017 and released in the United States exclusively on video on demand on January 18, 2018. Directed by Miguel Ángel Vivas from a screenplay penned by Jaume Balagueró, the film stars Rachel Nichols, Laura Harring, and Andrea Tivadar.

== See also ==
- Martyrs (2008)
