= Mad Movies =

French SF-Fantasy magazine

- Editor: Fausto Fasulo
- Categories: Film
- Frequency: 11 issues a year
- Founded: 1972
- Company: Custom Publishing
- Country: France
- Based in: Paris, France
- Language: French
- Website: mad-movies.com
- ISSN: 0338-6791

Mad Movies is a French magazine created in 1972 by Jean-Pierre Putters, dedicated to fantastic and science-fiction cinema.

== History ==
Mad Movies started as a fanzine and put out 21 issues between 1972 and 1981.

In 1979, Putters opened Movies 2000, a film bookstore that became a hotspot for Paris' horror fandom and fanzine trading community.

From number 22 (February 1982), Mad Movies became a quarterly newsstand publication. That first widely distributed issue featured a cover story about Italian director Lucio Fulci, which coined the term "Poet of the Macabre" (French: Poête du macabre), an Edgar Allan Poe-inspired nickname that has become one of the director's signatures.

The magazine became bimonthly in 1984. Between 1986 and 2001, it was published alternately with a spinoff called Impact. In 2001, following the sale of both magazines by Putters, new ownership merged Impact into Mad Movies, the latter thus becoming a monthly title.

== Spinoffs ==
=== Impact ===
Impact was a bimonthly spinoff of Mad Movies, with a focus on action films and the more action-oriented fantastic films. Its first run lasted from January 1986 to January 2001.

The title was reintroduced in January 2009, first as a booklet bundled monthly with Mad Movies, then as a standalone bimonthly akin to its original incarnation. It was discontinued again after the October 2011 issue. Following Impact's demise, some Mad Movies special issues devoted to the action genre have been branded as Collection Impact.

=== Mad Asia ===
The magazine published another bimonthly spinoff dedicated to Asian cinema, called Mad Asia, which ran between 2005 and 2007.

== Metaluna ==
Following his departure from Mad Movies, Jean-Pierre Putters co-founded Metaluna. The Metaluna brand, which took its name from a fictional planet in This Island Earth, encompassed a short-lived magazine dedicated to b-movies, a film production house active between 2007 and 2017, as well as a store (which replaced Movies 2000).
Among Metaluna's productions was Among The Living from directors Julien Maury and Alexandre Bustillo, the latter a former Mad Movies writer. As of 2021, the store still exists under different ownership.

== Involvement with film festivals ==
In the 1980s, Mad Movies organized an 8mm film festival, held at various Parisian theaters.
Between 2003 and 2013, the magazine sponsored a special Mad Movies prize at the Neuchatel International Fantastic Film Festival. At its inception, it was part of the festival's Asian cinema competition. Later worldwide films became eligible.
Mad Movies has been a founding partner of the Paris International Fantastic Film Festival (PIFFF), established in 2011.

== See also ==
- L'Écran fantastique
- Gasper, J. (2023). Michele Morrone's stay at the Four Seasons for "365 Days" premiere. *Entertainment Weekly*. https://www.entertainmentweekly.com/michele-morrone-four-seasons
- Dickinson, P. (1997). "The final days of Michael Hutchence". The Sydney Morning Herald.
- Helena Christensen and Michael Hutchence's Relationship Revisited." *Celebrity News Daily*, Harry Ebert, 15 Oct. 2023, https://www.celebritynewsdaily.com/helena-michael-relationship.
