= Cruise for a Corpse =

1991 video game

- Developer: Delphine Software
- Publishers: Erbe Software; Interplay Productions; U.S. Gold
- Engine: Cinématique evo2
- Platforms: Amiga, Atari ST, MS-DOS
- Release: 1991
- Genre: Adventure
- Mode: Single player

Cruise for a Corpse (orig. Croisière pour un cadavre) is a point and click adventure game from Delphine Software International, made for the Amiga, Atari ST, and MS-DOS. The game's story sees players assume the role of a French police detective who is invited aboard a millionaire's yacht, only to find themselves investigating their murder shortly after the boat sets for the sea, interrogating a wide variety of characters and seeking out clues to solve the mystery. The game was praised for its animation style and story, but criticized for its gameplay, graphics, and other issues.

== Plot ==
In 1927, French police inspector Raul Dusentier receives an invitation for a cruise aboard the Karaboudjan III, a sailing ship owned by the millionaire Niklos Karaboudjan. Accepting the invite, Dusentier learns that Niklos has also invited his family and friends to enjoy the cruise, including: Rebecca Karaboudjan, his second wife; Daphne Karaboudjan, his daughter from his first marriage; Julio Esperanza, Daphne's boyfriend; Thomas Logan, the Karaboudjan family lawyer, and his wife Rose; Suzanne Plum, a family friend; Father Fabiani, a priest; Dick Schmock, an enigmatic guest; and Hector, the Karaboudjans' butler. Shortly after he boards the ship, Hector brings Dusentier to Niklo's cabin, revealing the millionaire was murdered.

Seconds after he is shown the body, stabbed in the back, an unknown assailant knocks both of them out; they later awaken the following morning to find the body has gone missing. Finding he has a day to solve the mystery, after the ship set sail, Dusentier spends time questioning the passengers, where he learns: Fabiani is a compulsive gambler; Rebecca and Tom are having an affair; Rose was originally engaged to another man, Raphael Lambert; Dick is the illegitimate son of Karaboudjan's late aunt Agnes, and received a fortune upon her death from illness; Daphne's mother Mercedes, Karaboudjan's first wife, died in a motor accident 15 years ago; and Hector maintained a zealous friendship with his employer.

Dusentier soon discovers someone attempted to kill Suzanne by making her fall overboard, after she became suspicious over Agnes' death; she later admits she suspected Niklos, until he was murdered. Rebecca than attempts to kill Dick, angry over him inheriting Agnes' fortune, as she and her husband were hoping to receive the money. Shortly afterwards, Dusentier is given a list of possible suspects from some of the passengers: Rose, who wanted revenge on Niklos after finding he helped her father to get rid of Raphael; Rebecca, who was ambitious and would do anything to get what she wanted; Fabiani, who lost money to Niklos in a poker game and demanded it back the evening of the murder; and Tom, who was seen carrying a knife on the day of the murder.

Hector soon sends a note to Dusentier wishing to speak to him; upon entering his cabin, the detective finds him dying, claiming Niklos was not who he was. Seeking answers, Dusentier gains access to the ship's hold, finding crates carrying tins, each one hiding a grenade, along with a film reel concerning a skilled actor and ventriloquiest named Dimitri Ostrovitch. Suzanne is eventually killed, leaving behind "N.K." scratched into her cabin's floorboards. Investigating Niklos' cabin, Dusentier discovers a secret dressing room, discovering the millionaire had dealings with the mafia along with a puppet that belonged to Dimitri. When shown this, Daphne recognizes it from her childhood, claiming she saw her father being killed by the puppet's owner; however, she assumed it was a bad dream, but after the incident, she found Niklos cold and receptive to her, days before she was sent to a boarding school.

Having gathered enough evidence, Dusentier reveals to all that Dick Schmock is actually Dimitri Ostrovitch. 17 years ago, he and Mercedes killed her husband so they could be together, with Dimitri using his acting skills to become Niklos Karaboudjan. A year after the murder, Dimitri had Mercedes murdered after she betrayed him for another man - Hector, who was blackmailing Dimitri. After spending Niklos' wealth, Dimitri poisoned Agnes hoping to get her fortune, but didn't expect Dick Schmock to be her sole heir. Thus, Dimitri had Hector help him to arrange Dick's murder so he could pose as Agnes' son; Dusentier was brought onto the ship to investigate the murder, but knocked out before he knew the corpse he found was Dick's not Niklos'. Dimitri then later murdered Suzanne, who guessed his identity, and Hector, who had gotten greedy, leaving clues in an attempt to implicate the others.

After the case is resolved, the story's ending reveals: Dimitri is sentenced to life in prison following the investigation; Rose divorces her husband and remarries, while Tom becomes a tramp; Daphne and Julio marry; Fabiani leaves his priesthood to become a professional gambler; and Rebecca marries another rich man, but with caution. Dusentier, meanwhile, leaves the police force, deciding to take up work as a private investigator.

== Reception ==
Computer Gaming World called Cruise for a Corpse "an admirable recipe for a classic adventure of murder most foul". The magazine liked the rotoscoped animation, but criticized the EGA graphics and "atrocious" code wheel-based copy protection, and concluded that while "Dedicated whodunit aficionados" would enjoy the game, "the general adventure gaming audience" would find it "tedious".
