= Delphine Software International =

French video game development company

- Company type: Private
- Industry: Video games
- Founded: 1988
- Defunct: July 2004
- Headquarters: Paris, France
- Key people: Paul Cuisset
- Products: Another World; Flashback series Moto Racer series

Delphine Software International was a French video game developer. They were famous for publishing Another World and creating the cinematic platform game Flashback, which bore a similarity to Prince of Persia, both in gameplay and in its use of rotoscoped animation. It was also known for its Moto Racer series.

== History ==
Delphine Software International (DSI) was created in 1988 as a part of the Delphine Group and was initially based in Paris. It was headed by Paul de Senneville, and co-directed by Paul Cuisset, who was the company lead designer.

In 1993, a subsidiary company named Adeline Software International was created. In 2001, DSI relocated to Saint-Ouen. In December 2002, the company was removed from the Delphine Group. In February 2003, Delphine Software was sold to French game development company Doki Denki. Doki Denki closed down in July 2004 after bankruptcy and liquidation. Their official website has since shut down. As a consequence, Adeline also shut down around the same time.

== Game titles ==
Year	Game	Platform(s)
1989	Castle Warrior	Amiga, Atari ST
1989	Bio Challenge	Amiga, Atari ST
1989	Future Wars	Amiga, Atari ST, MS-DOS
1990	Operation Stealth	Amiga, Atari ST, MS-DOS
1991	Another World	3DO, Amiga, Apple IIGS, Atari ST, MS-DOS, Classic Mac OS, Super NES, Mega Drive/Genesis
1991	Cruise for a Corpse	Amiga, Atari ST, MS-DOS
1992	Flashback	3DO, Acorn Archimedes, Amiga, Jaguar, CD-i, MS-DOS, FM Towns, Classic Mac OS, PC-98, Mega-CD/Sega-CD, Mega Drive/Genesis, Super NES
1994	Shaq Fu	Amiga, Mega Drive/Genesis, Super NES
1995	Fade to Black	MS-DOS, PlayStation
1997	Moto Racer	Windows, PlayStation
1998	Moto Racer 2	Windows, PlayStation
1999	Darkstone	Windows, PlayStation
2000	Moto Racer World Tour	PlayStation
2001	Moto Racer 3	Microsoft Windows
2002	Moto Racer Advance	Game Boy Advance
Unfinished	Shaq-Fu 2	Mega Drive/Genesis, Super NES
Unfinished	Humanity Project	Windows
Unfinished	Devil Canvas	Windows, PlayStation 2
Unfinished	Legions of Fear	Windows, PlayStation 2
Unfinished	Moto Racer Traffic	Microsoft, PlayStation 2, Xbox
Unfinished	Flashback Legend	Game Boy Advance
