= Moto Racer 2 =

1998 video game

- Developer: Delphine Software International
- Publisher: Electronic Arts
- Platforms: PlayStation, Microsoft Windows
- Release: PlayStation: NA: 17 September 1998; EU: 1998; Windows: NA: 24 November 1998; EU: 1998
- Genre: Racing
- Modes: Single-player, multiplayer

Moto Racer 2 is a motocross racing game developed by Delphine and published by Electronic Arts for PlayStation and Microsoft Windows. It is part of the Moto Racer series, and is the sequel to Moto Racer.

Moto Racer 2 has more courses than its predecessor, and added a level editor. Moto Racer 2 garnered positive reviews from critics, praising its graphics and variety of gameplay.

== Gameplay ==
Races can take place on pavement or on dirt.

In Moto Racer 2, the player controls a motorcyclist on various terrain; the game offers motocross races and superbike street races. The game contains 32 race tracks and 16 motorcycles split evenly between motocross and superbike, and allows for the player to edit any track in the game using the level editor. It contains many of the same features as the previous game, including a split screen mode for the PlayStation version, and the player is allowed to choose between terrain set-ups prior to games. The game allows players to change between simulation mode and arcade mode to choose between a more realistic or playful experience.

Moto Racer 2 runs on a modified version of the original Moto Racer's engine, giving the game detailed textures and a faster frame rate. The player can move into a cockpit view during the game, allowing the player to see the entire environment as they drive.

== Reception ==
Reception

Aggregate score
Aggregator	Score	
Aggregator	PC	PS
GameRankings	72%	82%

Review scores
Publication	Score	
Publication	PC	PS
CNET Gamecenter	N/A	8/10
Computer Gaming World	3/5	N/A
Edge	7/10	N/A
Electronic Gaming Monthly	N/A	8/10
Famitsu	N/A	26/40
Game Informer	N/A	6.75/10
GamePro	N/A	4/5 (Note: GamePro gave the PlayStation version three 4/5 scores for graphics, sound, and overall fun factor, and 4.5/5 for control.)
GameSpot	8.1/10	8.1/10
IGN	8.6/10	8.7/10
Next Generation	N/A	4/5
Official U.S. PlayStation Magazine	N/A	4.5/5
PC Accelerator	8/10	N/A
PC Gamer (UK)	65%	N/A

The PlayStation version of Moto Racer 2 received favourable reviews, while the PC version received above-average reviews, according to the review aggregation website GameRankings. Next Generation said of the former version, "There is enough here to make it all worthwhile – just don't expect an entirely new game." In Japan, where the same console version was ported and published by Electronic Arts Square on 4 May 1999, Famitsu gave it a score of 26 out of 40.

IGN's Douglass C. Perry said that Moto Racer 2 was the best motorcycle racer seen on the PlayStation. He praised the game's accessibility to newcomers and variety in course collection; however, he criticized the game's mediocre graphics. GameSpot's Ryan MacDonald felt that the game wasn't as ground-breaking as the first in the series, but praised the DualShock control scheme and liked the improved visuals.

GameSpot's Michael E. Ryan noted that the game disappointed when compared to Motocross Madness, but praised the game for fast-paced arcade action. IGN's Tal Blevins disagreed with Ryan's assessment, feeling that the game appealed to hardcore gamers and casual gamers alike, and praised the game's realistic physics engine.

The PC version was nominated for the "Best Racing Game of the Year" award at IGN's Best of 1998 Awards, which went to Powerslide.
