= George Carter =

George Carter may refer to:

== Sportspeople ==
- George Carter (Australian footballer) (1910–1971), Australian footballer for Collingwood and Hawthorn
- George Carter (basketball) (1944–2020), basketball player
- George Carter (Bengal cricketer) (1908–1982), English cricketer
- George Carter (bowls) (1883–1935), New Zealand lawn bowls player
- George Carter (Hampshire cricketer) (1846–1911), English cricketer
- George Carter (Essex cricketer) (1901–1994), English cricketer
- George Carter (footballer, born 1866) (1866–1945), Southampton footballer and coach
- George Carter (footballer, born 1900) (1900–1981), West Ham United footballer
- George Carter (rugby union) (1854–1922), New Zealand rugby union player

== Politicians ==
- George Carter (New South Wales politician) (1841–1891), member of the New South Wales Legislative Assembly
- George Carter (Queensland politician) (1864–1932), member of the Queensland Legislative Assembly
- George R. Carter (1866–1933), territorial governor of Hawaii
- George D. Carter (1867–1951), American politician in the Virginia House of Delegates
- George W. Carter (1826–1901), American politician in the Louisiana House of Representatives

== Arts and entertainment ==
- George Carter (artist) (1737–1795), painter
- George Carter (musician), American blues musician
- George Carter (1835–1890), English organist and composer, brother of William Carter
- George Carter, fictional character on the British TV crime drama The Sweeney
- George Carter, fictional character on the Australian soap opera Neighbours

== Others ==
- George Carter I (1777–1846), Virginia plantation owner
- George Carter III (born 1945), inventor of laser tag
- George Carter (engineer) (1889–1969), aircraft designer at Gloster
- George Bertram Carter (1896–1986), English architect
- George Ethelbert Carter, first Canadian-born black judge
- George F. Carter (1912–2004), American geographer and anthropologist
- George Lafayette Carter (1857–1936), American entrepreneur
- George Stuart Carter (1893–1969), British zoologist
- George Carter-Campbell (1869–1921), British General
