= Alpha Waves =

1990 video game

- Developer: Infogrames
- Publishers: EU: Infogrames; NA: Data East
- Designer: Christophe de Dinechin
- Programmers: Christophe de Dinechin (ST); Frédérick Raynal (MS-DOS)
- Composer: Frederic Mentzen
- Platforms: Atari ST, Amiga, MS-DOS
- Release: 1990
- Genre: Platform
- Modes: Single-player, multiplayer

Alpha Waves (also released as Continuum) is a 3D platformer video game published in 1990 by Infogrames. It was released for the Atari ST, Amiga, and MS-DOS-based home computers. The player explores a labyrinth by moving their craft around a world, bouncing on platforms. The game has a new age theme in presentation and marketing.

It was developed initially for the Atari ST by Christophe de Dinechin for Infogrames. Inspired by Starglider 2 (1988) by Argonaut Games, Dinechin began working on how to create 3D graphics for the Atari ST which he pitched to Infogrames, and the company hired him to develop it into a full game. The game was ported to the Amiga and MS-DOS by Frédérick Raynal.

The game was given a new age theme by Infogrames, which Dinechin and Raynal later felt was a mistake. It was later released as Continuum by Data East. Reviews for the game complimented the games originality, with some publications giving mixed reception to the long lasting appeal of the game and its new age themes. Dinechin would not make another commercial video game, while Raynal said that working on Alpha Waves "made [him] think in 3D" and would later apply his knowledge of 3D games to his adventure game Alone in the Dark (1992).

== Gameplay ==
The MS-DOS version running on an i486 processor.

Mathias Fuchs in his book Phantasmal Spaces: Archetypical Venues in Computer Games described Alpha Waves as an early attempt bringing the traditional 2D platformer game genre into a 3D-world with interactions like moving and bouncing off platforms. He described the game as being "abstract" and "almost psychedelic presentation".

In Alpha Waves, the player controls a craft called a Mobile. The Mobile only has the ability move forward and rotate left and right. The player can control the in-game camera. The player can navigate 250 unique rooms. The Mobile can land on colored platforms that can allow it to bounce higher and higher as it gains momentum. Some areas in the game are locked, and require the player to collect a corresponding wire-frame polygon which acts as keys.

In "Action Mode", the game is a race against a timer (or, another player in the two-player mode) to earn points, collect objects and move from one room to the next. In "Emotion Mode", the rooms are grouped into 12 distinct areas, with each having its unique own colour scheme and names like "Dream", "Energize", "Awaken", and "Meditate". In this mode the player is free to explore without the time limit. Dinechin described "Emotion" as a "training mode" for the game.

In "Emotion Mode", the rooms are grouped into 12 distinct areas, with each having its unique own colour scheme and names like "Dream", "Energize", "Awaken", and "Meditate". In this mode the player is free to explore without the time limit.

For the Atari ST version, the two-player mode splits the screen where two players can play the game and interact with each other and explore different rooms simultaneously. In the Amiga and DOS ports, the two-player player mode has the players take turns to play the game.

== Development ==
Christophe de Dinechin began programming in this teens. He first began developing code for video games on his TI-99/4A in BASIC, later saying he only began coding serious video games when he got his Atari ST. In 1988, Dinechin was impressed by Starglider 2 (1988) by Argonaut Games, specifically with its shaded polygon graphics. He became determined to figure out how it was done and began working on code to create 3D graphics engine in his parents home. Dinechin developed new code that would slowly allow the Atari ST to manipulate polygonal objects. These included not clearing an entire screen but just the part of the screen that repaint or erase parts that have changed. He recalled in an interview published in 2015 that "today, you can move billions of polygons per instruction cycle, so who cares? But at the time it was important."

After developing a program that could display several cube polygons on the screen at a smooth rate, he added further restrictions such the ability to fly around the room the cubes were displayed in, he added walls, ceilings, collision detection for the cubes, the ability to bounce off the floor, platforms and gravity effects, and eventually having a goal to reach an exit door in each room. Dinechin likened the creation of this to the comic The Smurfs which features characters bouncing of floors to reach high up tables. He referred to the game as The Cube at the time.

At the same time, Dinechin took a game he was also working on, which he described as a video game clone of Time Bandit (1983), to the Lyon-based video game publishing company Infogrames in 1989. At the time, Infogrames was a small company, that Dinechin described as "really looking for their big hit." The interviewer at Infogrames was not interested in his the initial game, leading to Dinechin showing his working demo of The Cube. The game impressed the interviewer, who offered 5,000 francs to finish the game for Infogrames. As Dinechin had done unpaid work for the company earlier, he negotiated a royalties-based deal.

Over the next few months, with input from other staff member at Infogrames, Dinechin began expanding The Cube into a full game. He developed the game in assembly language on his Atari STacy, a portable version of the Atari ST. One of the biggest issues was developing how the in-game camera would track their playable character in the game. Dinechin said nobody could agree on which camera set-up was best, leading to different defaults for in later personal computer (PC) ports. By the end of development, the game was expanded to 256 rooms to explore, with each having abstract geometric shapes, a variety of platform types to bounce off of, and occasionally enemy characters.

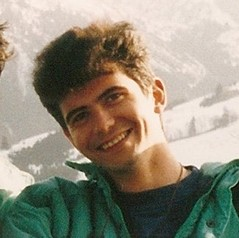
Frédérick Raynal in 1994. Raynal created a port of Alpha Waves in 1989.

The game's music was made by Frederic Mentzen. Dinechin complimented Mentzen's music, saying that outside music by Jean Michel Jarre, he described it as "the first time I'd hear music made on a computer that didn't really suck." The original Atari ST computer was no graphics card support, which would lead to all the 3D content to be performed by the central processing unit alone. This would push the performance of the computer so much that limited what developers could do with using sound in the game. The only music heard in the Atari ST release of the game played during the intro. The Atari ST did not have enough memory to allow both the game and the music at the same time. Both the Amiga and DOS-based systems equipped with Sound Blaster cards would allow for audio to be added during the game. During development, The Cube was re-titled Alpha Waves by Infogrames.

According to Dinechin, Frédérick Raynal, who joined Infogrames in August 1989, was in charge of reviewing his code before submitting it for production. Raynal saw that the code had a lot comments and told his supervisor he could port it from assembly language into C programming language for a PC release. He developed the port of Alpha Waves to MS-DOS-based PCs in 1989. When visiting the Infogrames, Ace magazine wrote that Raynal's version had three modes to play: one that would increase alpha waves, one to increase Beta Waves for rapid thinking, and a third mode specially designed to increase the player's capacity for learning.

== Release ==
Tilt said that Alpha Waves was set for release for the Atari ST, Amiga and PC in either May or June 1990. Alpha Waves was shown at the 1990 Consumers Electronic Show in London between September 13 and 16th along with other Infogrames published titles such as Murders in Space and Metal Masters. It was released in 1990 and published by Infogrames. Alpha Waves was the third game published by Infogrames along with The Light Corridor and Welltris with their new age themed presentation they called the "Crystal Collection".

The game was published by Data East in North America as Continuum. Dinechin said he was unaware that Infogrames had sold it to Data East and said he does not believe he received royalties from this version. He recalled that the poor sales of the series in North America led him to leave game development.

The game was given a new age-theme within the game and for its promotion. This was created by Infogrames chief creative officer Bruno Bonnell. The theme extended into the game design with areas in the 3D maze being given titles like "Awaken" and "Meditate". De Deinchin later said that the new age theme of the game was a mistake and potentially impacted its sales. Raynal echoed this saying that as the game was a fast-paced 3D platformer with lots of moving objects and challenge, he felt it was a mistake to promote it as a "new age brain-motivating experience, instead of an efficient modern platformer."

== Reception ==
Reception

Review scores
Publication	Score		
Publication	Amiga	Atari ST	DOS
ACE			600/1000
Amiga Format	70%		
Amiga Power	60%		
Computer and Video Games			70%
The Games Machine			92%
Joystick		90%	95%
The One			80%
Power Play	38%	38%	
Raze		85%	
ST Action		3/5	
ST Format		83%	
VideoGames & Computer Entertainment	9/10		9/10

Reviews from various gaming publications commented on the gameplay, visuals, and themes of the game. Reviews in ST Action, Tilt and Italy's The Games Machine magazines complimented the originality of the game, with the latter publications saying they had never seen a game like it. One review in Joystick expanded on this saying the originality came from being able to see the game world from every possible angle while summarizing that that Alpha Waves "isn't a typical game, so it won't be accessible to everyone." Reviewers in Amiga Format described the game as "truly weird", while Amiga Power found the game "bizarre" but with a "certain charm". Other reviews in The One, Computer & Video Games, and Power Play found the game appealing at first but found it grew either too tiring or difficult over extended play periods. A review in ACE said it "will probably only serve as a bit of light relief from "proper" games." while Computer Gaming World wrote that the end-goals in the game were too uninspiring, which led to the mazes growing duller as you explored. The publication concluded that "with a head-to-head, modern race-through-the-maze, blast-'em-if-you-see-'em upgrade, this software would have attracted a lot more attention." and that it "falls short in the most important department of lasting entertainment." Other reviews, from the ST Format, Game Player's, Newsday and Raze found the game positively addicting, with the latter publication stating "Just bouncing around sounds remarkably uninteresting but as soon as you start to play it becomes more important than Twin Peaks."

Discussing the visuals, Joystick and ST Action found the 3D graphics well done for the computer system, with Joystick specifically highlighting that there was very little lag in the animation. ST Format found the graphics weak in comparison to the 3D game Driller (1987). Joystick Tilt and Game Player's also highlighted the visuals for the DOS version of the game with Tilt describing them as "sober but effective graphics" while Game Players commented the camera movement combined with the movement of the mobile proved to be so smooth, even in two-player split screen mode, that they suggested players who were easily queasy approach the game with caution.

Reviewers commented on the game's new age themes, with Joystick saying that Alpha Waves is "as fun as it is weird, and you can just as easily love it as hate it." Reviewers in ACE and Power Play described the themes as "unforgivable nonsense" and "ridiculous" respectively. One reviewer from VideoGames & Computer Entertainment said that "Although it's strange to be manipulated by a machine, believe it or not, at least some of these regions did evoke a response."

Tilt listed Alpha Waves as one of the best games of the year in 1990 praising the high quality animation while finding the graphics "quite repetitive". They concluded that the game was "undoubtedly one of the most original programs of the year." VideoGames & Computer Entertainment wrote in 1991 that the game was Data East's best release to date.

== Legacy ==
Alpha Waves was the final commercial game developed by Dinechin, with the creator saying "After a while, I realized I have other ways to make a living, there is more out there than videogames, and I sort of gave up — not necessarily for the worst." At a retrospective of the game at the software engineering conference FOSDEM in 2020, Dinechin said that he thought Alpha Waves did not have the best 3D effects at the time, which he said he felt belonged to the game Falcon (1987). In their book Vintage Games (2009), authors Bill Loguidice and Matt Barton said that similar "jumping-centric" 3D platformer games be released such as Jumping Flash! (1995) and Montezuma's Return (1998). Kyle Hilliard of Game Informer wrote that Alpha Waves was a pioneer in 3D platform games while Super Mario 64 (1996) was the innovator of the genre. This was due to the latter game setting up staples of the genre such as having power-ups, diverse goals and unique environments.

While making the port, he said the game "made me think in 3D" and how he could apply 3D to adventure games with character models and animation. When working on the port of Alpha Waves, Raynal began to believe it was possible to create new animation systems for home computers that included human characters. He developed them to be presented in front of 3D bitmapped backgrounds that would later be used in the game Alone in the Dark (1992).
