= Battle Tag =

- Developer: Ubisoft
- Publisher: Ubisoft
- Director: Frédérick Raynal (Creator)
- Producer: Gael Seydoux
- Designer: Guillaume Drapier
- Composer: Dominique Voegelé
- Release: NA: November 2010
- Genre: Laser tag
- Mode: Multiplayer

Battle Tag is a laser tag-shooter hybrid game developed and published by Ubisoft. The game was revealed at E3 2010 at the Ubisoft press conference. The game was released in November 2010 in Texas and Canada.

== Gameplay ==
Battle Tag shares similarities with laser tag. Players wear harnesses with sensors and shoot at other players with wired guns that are attached to their harnesses. As the game progresses, the players' scores are uploaded to their Windows-based PC which tallies the scores and declares the winner. The game contains a multiplayer leaderboard component so players can compete with others by high scores online. Battle Tag uses an Ubiconnect sensor, which allows the players to play in a range of 1,000 feet from the sensor. Matches are allowed to have a maximum of eight players at a time per ubiconnect device with a maximum of 5 ubiconnect devices or 40 players. Players can use plastic markers to create parameters and requirements for their games. The game shipped with two harnesses, two guns, and other accessories that add to the gameplay.

== Development ==
The game was presented by the game's producer Gael Seydoux as a "real live shooter that you could play at home with all your friends." The game follows the trend of E3 2010 games to focus on more non-traditional aspects of gaming.

== Reception ==
Gaming critics were mostly confused by the game's presentation at Ubisoft's E3 2010 press conference. Models and game developers armed with harnesses and laser guns began playing the game and running around the auditorium during the press conference. The introduction of Battle Tag won GameSpot's "Biggest What the...?'" special achievement award from E3 2010. G4's Andrew Pfister thought that presentation of the game was poorly thought through. The Guardian's Keith Stuart stated, "I'm not sure I entirely understood what was going on". Eurogamer's Ellie Gibson called it "Laser Quest for your house."

== Release/Pre-release ==
On 20 November, 2010, a limited test release of 15 Toys R US stores in Texas and all Zellers stores in Canada was announced.
