= Time Commando =

1996 video game

- Developer: Adeline Software International
- Publishers: EU: Electronic Arts; NA: Activision
- Director: Frédérick Raynal
- Producer: Serge Plagnol
- Designer: Didier Chanfray
- Composer: Philippe Vachey
- Platforms: MS-DOS, Windows, PlayStation, Saturn
- Release: NA: 24 August 1996; EU: July 1996
- Genre: Action-adventure
- Mode: Single player

Time Commando is an action-adventure video game developed by Adeline Software and published by Electronic Arts in Europe, Activision in America (United States and Brazil), and Virgin Interactive Entertainment (IBM PC compatible and PlayStation) and Acclaim Entertainment (Saturn) in Japan.

It was originally released for the PC on 31 July 1996 in Europe, the United States and Brazil, and was later ported for PlayStation and released on 30 September 1996 in Europe and the United States, and on 15 November 1996 in Japan. A Sega Saturn version of the game developed by Virtual Studio was also released in Japan on 5 March 1998.

Time Commando was re-released for modern computer systems on 6 January 2012 by GOG.com.

== Story ==
At the Historical Tactical Center, the military, with the help of a private corporation, has created a computer capable of simulating any form of combat from any point in history. However, a programmer from a rival corporation infects the system with a "Predator Virus" that creates a time-distortion vortex, which threatens to swallow the world if it is not destroyed. The player controls Stanley Opar, a S.A.V.E. operative (Special Action for Virus Elimination) at the facility who enters the vortex to try and stop the virus.

In order to accomplish this, Stanley must combat various enemies throughout different time periods. These eras are Prehistoric (featuring cavemen, saber tooth tigers, and cave bears), Roman Empire, Feudal Japan, Medieval, Conquistador, Wild West, Modern Wars (World War I and supposedly World War III), Future (Stanley's era), and finally, inside the main computer (Virus World), culminating in a showdown with the virus itself.

== Gameplay ==
In each level, Stanley collects various weapons exclusive to the time period. Stanley has a small life bar that grows larger when the player picks up life power-ups. Along the same lines, Stanley has multiple lives. As the player plays through a level, a time bar, which counts the time until the virus completely takes over and the player dies, slowly fills. This bar can be emptied by depositing computer chips collected throughout the levels in various "orb pools," which resemble the vortex Stanley first entered.

== Music ==
The music soundtrack was composed by Philippe Vachey.
The PC CD-ROM contains two audio tracks:

- Track 1 - "Time Commando"
- Track 2 - "Rush"

== Development ==
Adeline Software International's initial plan after the release of Little Big Adventure was to begin work on a sequel, but it became apparent that there was not enough time to complete it in time for Christmas 1995. Because of this, they decided to create a "quick, small, simple game" to secure a Christmas release. Work began on Time Commando with a focus on graphics but no planning on the actual gameplay. This development approach, along with Adeline's admission that making a small game is not in their nature, meant that the Christmas release date was missed, resulting in an actual release date of 31 July 1996.

The 3D engine used in Time Commando was a re-written version of the engine used in Little Big Adventure which resulted in it being faster, and also having slightly improved animations.

== Reception ==
Reception

Review scores
Publication	Score
Electronic Gaming Monthly	6.125/10 (PS)
Famitsu	7/10, 4/10, 5/10, 5/10 (PS)
GameSpot	8.2/10 (PC); 7/10 (PS)
Next Generation	3/5 (PS)

By August 1999, Time Commando had sold above 500,000 units.

The four reviewers of Electronic Gaming Monthly liked the game's concept and the weapons the player can use in each era, but criticized the animations and the difficulty in hitting enemies due to the poor controls and full motion video scrolling. Crispin Boyer and Sushi-X in particular remarked that the game is mainly enjoyable due to the unintentionally humorous animations. GameSpot also mentioned problems with the controls and animation but were otherwise more positive, summarizing that "Time Commando's stunning 3-D graphics and innovative gameplay bring action and adventure on the PlayStation to dizzying heights." Atomic Dawg of GamePro actually praised the controls, but agreed that "the overall visual impact is diminished by pokey, lame-looking basic moves." His main criticism was how slowly the game moves whenever the player is not in a fight, and he concluded Time Commando to be an essentially good game that players would need an unusually high amount of patience to enjoy. A Next Generation critic said in a brief review that "It looks good, but it's repetitive, the control is twitchy, and it never quite takes off."
