= Christophe de Dinechin =

French computer scientist

- Born: France
- Occupation: Computer scientist
- Known for: XL programming language Alpha Waves; HP Integrity Virtual Machines

Christophe de Dinechin is a French computer scientist, with contributions in video games, programming languages and operating systems.

== Programming languages ==
Dinechin contributed to C++, notably a high-performance exception handling implementation that became a de facto standard in the industry. de Dinechin was one of the proponents of a portable C++ ABI, initially developed for Itanium, but now widely used across platforms.

=== XL programming language ===
Dinechin is the designer of the XL programming language and associated concept programming methodology. "XL" is named for "eXtensible Language".

XL features programmer-reconfigurable syntax and semantics. Compiler plug-ins can be used to add new features to the language. A base set of plug-ins implements a relatively standard imperative language. Programmers can write their own plug-ins to implement application-specific notations, such as symbolic differentiation, which can then be used as readily as built-in language features.

==== Similar works ====
There are projects that exploit similar ideas to create code with higher level of abstraction. Among them are:

- Language-oriented programming
- Literate programming
- Model-driven architecture

== Video games ==
As initial developer of Alpha Waves, a "groundbreaking" Atari ST game (listed in the Guinness World Records as the first 3D platform game), de Dinechin heavily influenced Frederick Raynal, the main developer of Alone in the Dark. de Dinechin also wrote a few viral games for HP-48 calculators, and was the first person to take advantage of hardware-scrolling on these machines.

== Operating systems design ==
In the early 2000s, he worked as a software architect for HP-UX, and was the initial designer of HP's virtualisation platform for Itanium servers, HP Integrity Virtual Machines. He was awarded 10 US patents for this work.

Since 2022, he also is the initiator and maintainer of DB48X, a new implementation of RPL.

== Other work ==
Christophe de Dinechin did the initial port of Emacs to the Aqua user interface. He wrote a variety of open-source drivers for the HP DE200C Digital Entertainment Center, turning it from a web-connected CD Player into a true digital video recorder.

Between 2010 and 2017, Christophe de Dinechin was the CEO of Taodyne, a company developing a 3D animation tool, using a derivative of his XL programming language called Tao3D to describe dynamic documents.

== Bibliography ==
Dinechin has published three books:

- A French science-fiction novel called Informagie
- A French book about physics called Réunifions la physique
- A physics book called A theory of incomplete measurements
