= Photon (TV series) =

- Genre: Science fiction Action
- Country of origin: United States
- No. of episodes: 26

Production
- Executive producers: Jean Chalopin; Andy Heyward; Tetsuo Katayama
- Running time: 60 min.
- Production company: DIC Enterprises

Original release
- Network: Syndication
- Release: September 20, 1986 – March 14, 1987

Photon is a live action television show that aired in the mid-1980s, which was tied into the Photon lasertag arenas and home game. It was produced by DIC Enterprises as a first run syndicated children's series that ran in various syndicated markets throughout much of the mid-eighties. Animator Shinji Aramaki served as miniature model maker/designer on the special effects team for the series.

== Premise ==
Photon follows the adventures of a young high school student, Christopher Jarvis with the alias of "Bhodi Li". Chris discovers that the lasertag game Photon is actually a way to detect the strongest warriors in the galaxy, who will then be recruited to fight the forces of darkness. After shooting his laser gun and saying "The light shines!", he would be transported to a space station to join his fellow Photon Warriors. His alien compatriots include an orphan earthling boy genius named Parcival, a shape-changing blob named Pike, a lizard-like creature named Leon, a cyborg named Lord Baethan, and Tivia, a black ninja princess from Nivia populated by women after the males became extinct. Their mentor is a sentient computer named MOM (Multiple Operation Matrix). The villains' motto is "Let the darkness grow!"

The mission of each faction is to find the Photon crystal on each planet just as it nears the end of its hundred-year charge. If the Photon warriors are the first to shoot the crystal, the planet will be changed into a vital place full of life. If the villains do so, it will become a barren wasteland.

== Cast and characters ==
- Bhodi Li (played by Christopher Lockwood)
- Tivia, Princess of Nivia (played by Loretta Haywood)
- Lord Beathan (played by Graham Ravey)
- Parcival (played by Eros Rivers)
- Leon/Sarge (played by Akiyoshi Ono)
- Uncle Pike (played by Kazuhisa Kanamaru)
- Kathy Jarvis (played by Clarissa Reid)
- Barbara Jarvis (played by Tamara Johnson)
- Richard Jarvis (played by Paul Laroque)
- Pirarr (played by Sam Taylor)
- Mandarr/Evan Kiley (played by David Stay)
- Warriarr (played by Satoshi Ishihara)
- Dogarr (played by Deiichi Igarashi)
- Bugarr (played by Yoshito Shiraishi)
- Destructarr (played by Yoshito Nagatsuka)

== Production ==
The show was filmed in both the U.S. and Japan. Many of the costumes were designed and worn by people who worked on Super Sentai and other tokusatsu programs in Japan. Production values were rather low, and a majority of the sets were chroma-keyed in.

The show only lasted one season, but it did have a proper series finale.

Directors were Yasuhiro Horiuchi and Koichi Nakajima.

Writers were Ray Dryden, Tsunehisa Itô, Satoshi Namiki, and Sukehiro Tomita.

== Rebroadcast ==
The Club Mario segments of The Super Mario Bros. Super Show! included segments of Photon under the title Spaced Out Theater.

== Episodes ==
| No. | Title | Original release date |
|---|---|---|
| 1 | "The Recruit" | September 20, 1986 |
Featured songs: "Footloose" and "Sussudio"
| 2 | "Skin Deep" | September 27, 1986 |
Featured song: "Jumpin' Jack Flash"
| 3 | "A Grave Matter" | October 4, 1986 |
Featured song: "The Heat is On"
| 4 | "Just for Fun" | October 11, 1986 |
Featured songs: "Beat It" and "Looking for Clues"
| 5 | "No Laughing Matter" | October 18, 1986 |
Featured songs: "Angel" and "Twist and Shout"
| 6 | "Queen's Pawn (Note: True name unknown)" | October 25, 1986 |
Featured songs: "Born to Be Wild" and "Somebody's Watching Me"
| 7 | "Deadly Thorns" | November 1, 1986 |
Featured songs: "I Love Rock 'n' Roll" and "Isn't She Lovely"
| 8 | "Rebel of Cyborgs" | November 8, 1986 |
Featured songs: "Higher Love" and "Superstition"
| 9 | "United We Stand" | November 15, 1986 |
Featured songs: "Cum On Feel the Noize" and "War"
| 10 | "The Nivian Challenge" | November 22, 1986 |
Featured song: "Honky Tonk Women"
| 11 | "If At First You Don't Succeed" | November 29, 1986 |
Featured song: "Thriller"
| 12 | "The Road Not Taken" | December 6, 1986 |
Featured song: "Runaway"
| 13 | "By the Book" | December 13, 1986 |
Featured songs: "Axel F" and "Electric Avenue"
| 14 | "One of a Kind" | December 20, 1986 |
Featured songs: "Go Home" and "White Horse"
| 15 | "Space Terror" | December 27, 1986 |
Featured songs: "Addicted to Love" and "Danger Zone"
| 16 | "Maze of Fear" | January 3, 1987 |
Featured song: "Let's Spend the Night Together"
| 17 | "Necessity and Invention" | January 10, 1987 |
Featured songs: "Feelin' Alright?" and "It's Only Rock 'n Roll (But I Like It)"
| 18 | "Think Quick" | January 17, 1987 |
Featured songs: "Born to Be Wild", "Don't Stop 'Til You Get Enough", and "Runaway"
| 19 | "Dinosaur" | January 24, 1987 |
Featured songs: "Don't Stop 'Til You Get Enough", "The Harder They Come", and "Thriller"
| 20 | "Not a Care in the World" | January 31, 1987 |
| 21 | "Mind Zapped" | February 7, 1987 |
Featured songs: "Don't Forget Me (When I'm Gone)" and "Thriller"
| 22 | "The Right Time" | February 14, 1987 |
Featured song: "Axel F"
| 23 | "Lost Time" | February 21, 1987 |
Featured songs: "Born to Be Wild" and "Danger Zone"
| 24 | "The Light Flickers" | February 28, 1987 |
Featured song: "Jumpin' Jack Flash"
| 25 | "Friends and Enemies" | March 7, 1987 |
Featured songs: "(I Can't Get No) Satisfaction" and "Sledgehammer"
| 26 | "Stalemate" | March 14, 1987 |
Featured song: "Automatic"

== Related books ==
There were a number of book tie-ins, some of them written by comic book, TV and sci-fi author Peter David.

Two series of books were planned and started. The series aimed at a younger audience was by David under the pseudonym of David Peters, and six books were written. The only published novel of the series aimed at the Young Adult market was written by Michael P. Kube-McDowell under the house name Michael Hudson.
