= 2Dark =

Stealth adventure horror game

- Developer: Gloomywood
- Publisher: Bigben Interactive
- Director: Frédérick Raynal
- Platforms: Microsoft Windows, PlayStation 4, Xbox One
- Release: March 10, 2017
- Genres: Adventure, Stealth, Survival horror
- Mode: Single-player

2Dark is a stealth adventure horror game directed by Frédérick Raynal, known for developing Alone in the Dark.

== Plot ==
A former detective named Mr. Smith travels to the town of Gloomywood to solve a mystery involving disappearing children.

== Gameplay ==
Gameplay is intended to be simplistic and accessible to casual gamers. The player can pick up items by walking into them. Stealth plays a large role in the gameplay, and the player can stay in the dark and tread quietly to hide their location. Enemies can be alerted by sounds that the player makes. Supplies are constricted, so it will benefit the player if they collect various items. The player will need to rescue children, who will move slowly and be susceptible to danger. The children are in intricate levels, which you will need to find them in, and escape. Left alone too long, the kids will start to cry and move, which will end up putting everyone in danger.

== Development ==
2Dark was funded on the Ulule crowdfunding platform on November 21, 2014, raising €33,928 on a goal of €30,000.

On October 26, 2015, a trailer of 2Dark was published. It was confirmed that the game was being developed by a new French studio called Gloomywood, which initially consisted of four people, with Frédérick Raynal directing. The beta was made available to buy for €20.

The game was featured at E3 2015 and at the Game Developers Conference 2016.

On March 11, 2016, Gloomywood confirmed that 2Dark would be released on consoles in addition to PC.

During the game's Ulule campaign, Gloomywood promised that the game would be released without digital rights management (DRM) protection. When the game was released, however, it contained the Denuvo DRM software. Shortly after the game's release, the DRM protection was cracked by the CPY warez group, and the developers subsequently removed Denuvo.

The crowdfunding campaign had also said versions for Linux and Mac were being developed, but versions for these platforms have not been released.

== Reception ==
2Dark garnered mixed reviews, and holds an average of 56/100 on aggregate web site Metacritic. Fellow review aggregator OpenCritic assessed that the game received weak approval, being recommended by 32% of critics. PlayStation Universe awarded it a score of 4.0 out of 10, saying "The setup for 2Dark holds intrigue, with a grim plot, and suitably creepy settings, but so much of how it actually plays out quickly diminishes the horror aspect of it. Respectable enough as a game, a failure for horror."
