= Photon: The Ultimate Game on Planet Earth =

Early commercial laser tag arena

Photon was the name of the first commercial lasertag arenas. The company also came out with a home lasertag game, and there were various media tie-ins: a TV show also called Photon and a series of novels by Peter David.

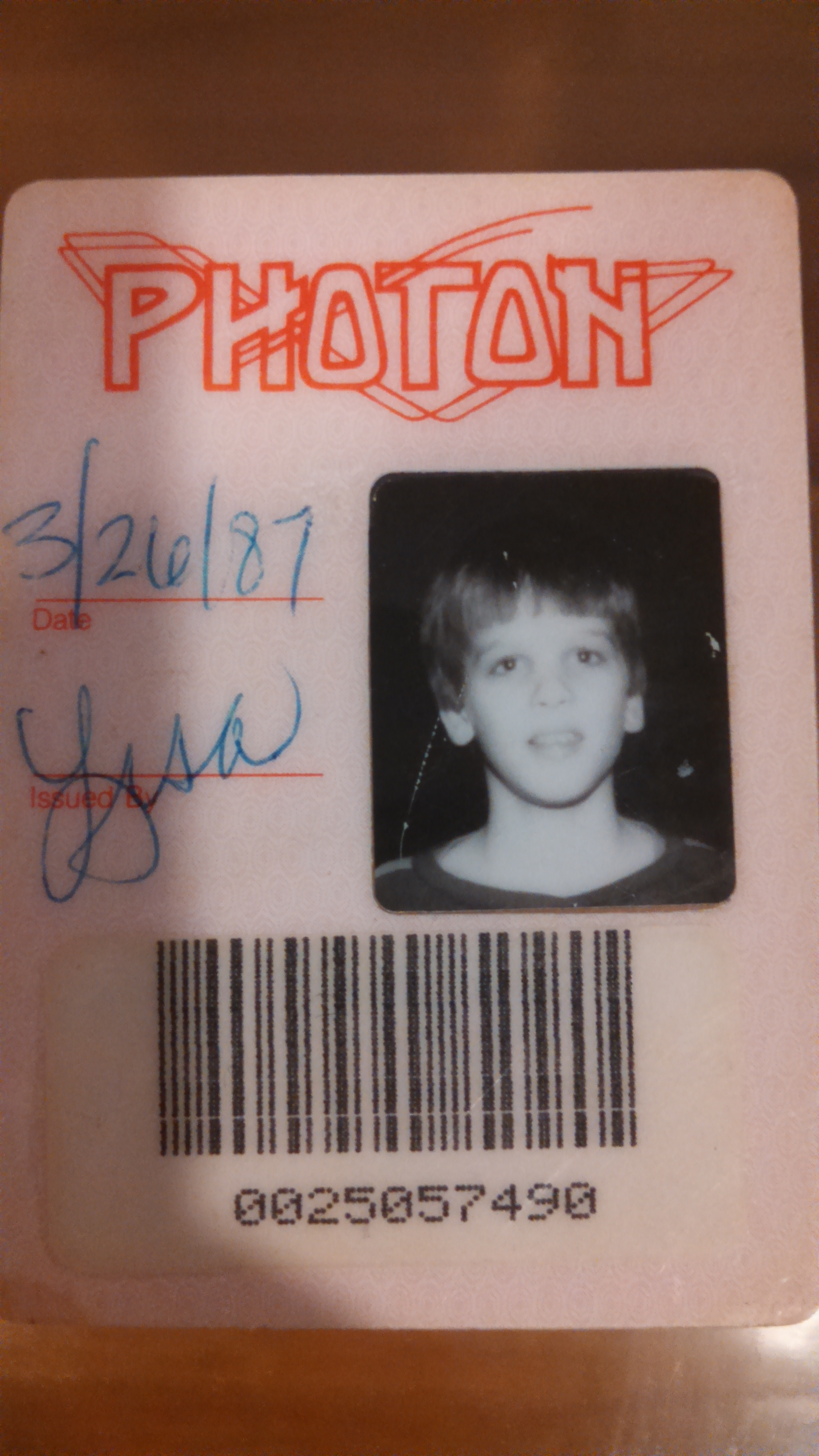
Photon center ID badge

== History ==
George Carter III came up with the idea for Photon while watching Star Wars when it premiered in 1977. In 1982, research and development started in earnest, and the first Photon center in the Dallas suburb of Garland, Texas, opened in March 1984. The original architect for Photon was J.C. Collins and his prototype was installed in the center at Garland, Texas in early 1984. The system was redesigned to facilitate production and improve performance after prototyping by a formal engineering team led by Kirk Gay, Dan Sellari and Roger Hunter of Dallas, Texas. The first franchisee opened in Toronto in June 1985.

The home units were introduced in 1986 as an Entertech product, at the same time as the Lazer Tag brand units of competitor Worlds of Wonder. Both companies were successful in the Christmas shopping season of 1986.

By 1987, 70 franchise licenses had been sold and 45 arenas were operating.

Also in 1987, Takara published a 3D Maze shooting game for the Famicom based upon Photon. The game was never released outside of Japan.

In 1989, lack of financing and loss of franchise revenue forced the corporation to sell off its assets and cease operations.

In 2007, a new Photon center was constructed in Broken Arrow, Oklahoma. It opened on July 1, 2008, but on September 9, after less than 9 weeks, lack of business revenue forced the center to cease operations.

In 2014, a former Photon operator has begun an IndieGoGo campaign to bring Photon back for a reunion party.

In 2019, the same former Photon operator continued to hold once a year "Phocon" event where the original Photon equipment would be used throughout the weekend.

A documentary titled Let There Be Light: Photon, and the Birth, Life, and Legacy of Laser Tag, which chronicles the creation of Photon and the impact it had on laser tag, through interviews with former players, staff members, and George Carter III, was released in 2021.

== Technology and gameplay ==
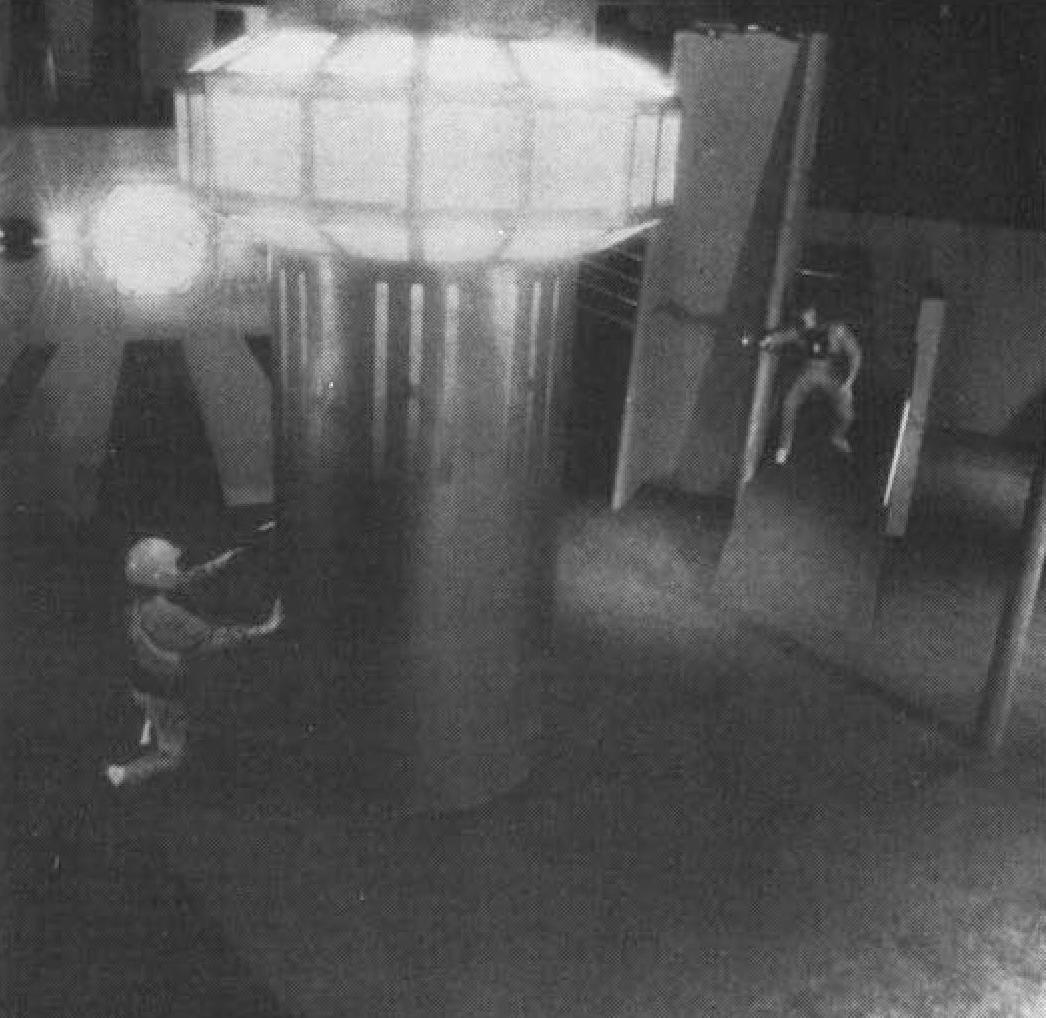
Texas location, 1984

While primitive compared to technology today, entailing wearing 15 pounds of battery packs and equipment, Photon was one of the first video game-like experiences that one could play in the real world. The arenas featured multiple levels, catwalks, mazes, and an observation deck where people not participating could cheer on their friends in the game, or get target practice by shooting players from special token-operated emplacements. Shots from observation deck guns did not affect the game in any way at most arenas. This contrasted sharply with competing laser-tag centers, whose fields were small, single-level, composed of clusters of free-standing painted cardboard barriers, and typically contained no observation area of any sort. Also, in Photon, players were allowed to roam at will through the entire playing field rather than be restricted to team-specific zones.

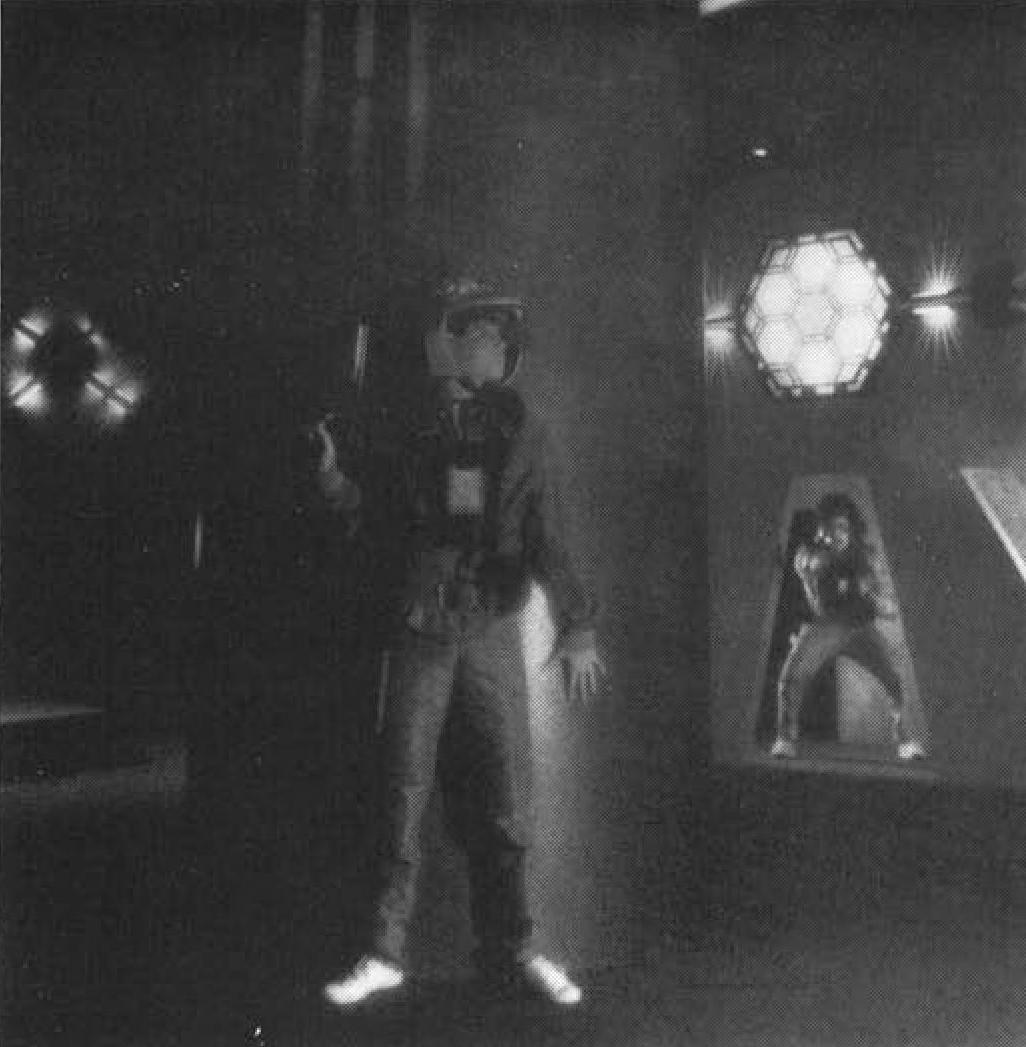
Texas location, 1984

Photon players joined either a red or green team (solo games were also an option, called "free-for-alls"), and played in an arena. Dramatic music by Ken Caillat, strobe effects, and smoke machines were used in the arena during games to enhance play. Players gained points for shooting other players and for shooting the enemy team's base. Players lost points for being shot ("zapped" in game terminology) or by shooting teammates. A player "zapping" a teammate would lose a massive amount of score and be automatically "zapped" himself. One feature of the game was that no player could be "zapped" more than three consecutive times by the same player. This forced players to vary, or "clear", their targets before being able to score points on the same player again. When "zapped", a player's weapon would be inert for five seconds and then reactivate automatically, with no need to "charge up" at a base as was required in the games of competitors. At some locations, the amount of time a player's weapon would be inert would vary based on score. A player with a high score would have an inert weapon for up to 10 seconds. For safety reasons, referees would try to enforce the rule that they had to be at least 5 feet away from the opponent they were shooting at. Photon used an infrared gun and receiver system, which did not actually fire visible lasers. As technology improved and more arenas opened, IR guns using a visible laser and a built in gun site began to appear in gameplay.

Customers joined by purchasing a photo ID badge (ranging in price at different areas from $10–35), and then paid a per-game fee (or a blanket fee on special nights that allowed unlimited play). Games lasted six minutes, with cues from the soundtrack that regular players could utilize for more strategic games. During game play, monitors on the observation deck and in the waiting areas showed scoring, with players listed under self-chosen handles. Most players referred to each other by their handles, which became its own identity, instead of their real names. League players in retail games would often tag their handles with their team names, like multiplayers do today, to distinguish themselves from the "noobs" or new players.

In many franchises, Photon leagues were formed, and tournament games were held regularly. Tactics and strategy were a big part of league competition and rules governing the covering of IR sensors were often implemented for players that would obscure their ability to get hit by pressing against walls or wearing their helmet high on the head to avoid being zapped by straight on shots. This included "cocking", which was described as cocking player's head back to obscure the helmet, holding gun slightly down between shooting to avoid direct gun shots, while covering their breastplate with their hand.

== Reviews ==
- Analog Science Fiction and Fact
