= Adeline Software International =

French video game developer

- Type: Private (subsidiary of Delphine Software International)
- Industry: Video games
- Founded: February 1993
- Defunct: July 2004
- Fate: Bankruptcy
- Successor: No Cliché
- Headquarters: Lyon, France
- Key people: Frédérick Raynal
- Number of employees: 21
- Website: www.adelinesoftware.com (defunct)

Adeline Software International was a video game developer founded in February 1993 as a subsidiary company of Delphine Software International, and based in Lyon, France. The team mostly came from Infogrames, another French video game company, after a disagreement about sequels of the Alone in the Dark bestseller.

== History ==
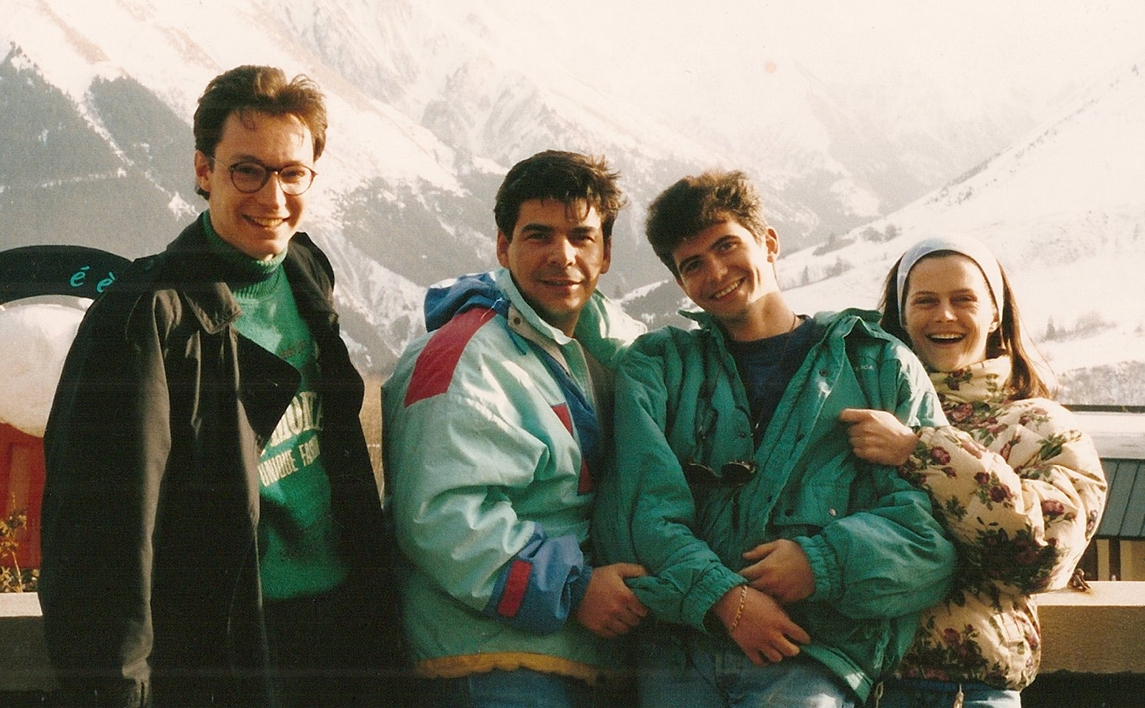
Founders

The company employed 21 people including graphic artists, developers and musicians. Five members made up the core of the team: Frédérick Raynal (creative director), Yaël Barroz (computer artist in charge of scenery), Didier Chanfray (artistic director), Serge Plagnol (technical director), and Laurent Salmeron (resource manager).

After the release of Little Big Adventure 2 in 1997, the company slowly went quiet, and in July, the core team was sold to Sega, becoming No Cliché and leaving Adeline as an empty group within Delphine.

Years after the apparent demise of Adeline, the brand was revived in 2002 by Delphine, and put it in charge of the development of Moto Racer Advance, released for the Game Boy Advance. However, no members from the original Adeline staff were involved in the development. This new team at Adeline was also tasked with developing the game Flashback Legend, a sequel to the Flashback series which ended up being cancelled during 2003. The liquidation of Delphine in July 2004 marked the definite death of Adeline.

A third Little Big Adventure game has been a talking topic since 2000.

== Games ==
- Little Big Adventure (1994)
- Time Commando (1996)
- Little Big Adventure 2 (1997)
- Moto Racer Advance (2002)
- Flashback Legend (cancelled)
