= Toy Commander =

1999 video game

- Developer: No Cliché
- Publisher: Sega
- Director: Frédérick Raynal
- Producer: Frantz Cournil
- Designers: Lionel Chaze; Didier Quentin
- Programmers: Serge Plagnol; Frantz Cournil
- Artist: Didier Chanfray
- Composer: Philippe Vachey
- Platform: Dreamcast
- Release: EU: 14 October 1999; NA: 2 November 1999
- Genres: Action, adventure
- Modes: Single-player, multiplayer

Toy Commander is a 1999 action game developed by No Cliché and published by Sega for the Dreamcast. A Microsoft Windows version was planned for release in 2001, but despite being almost completed, it was ultimately cancelled, due to No Cliché shutting down the following year.

== Plot ==
The game's plot revolves around a child named Andy (Guthy in the European game, mostly referred to on screen as "Toy Commander"), who gets new army-themed toys for Christmas, and neglects his childhood favorites. The toys, led by Huggy Bear, Andy's childhood teddy bear, rebel and try to destroy the new toys.

Each boss in the game has taken over a specific area of the house, serving as one of Huggy Bear's Generals.

== Gameplay ==
In the game, the player must complete missions by controlling toys (usually in the form of vehicles). These missions take place in rooms of a house. The game is known for its unique tasks themed around the various household areas. For instance, the first mission, which takes place in the kitchen, is a basic training level involving swapping vehicles and different types, including a helicopter, pick-up and plane. Meanwhile, the second level involves using a toy car to roll eggs over to a pot of boiling water.

The game has five basic types of playable vehicles: race cars, which are primarily used in racing missions (although some missions have the player navigating mazes in race cars), armed ground vehicles such as tanks or trucks with rocket launchers, airplanes, helicopters, and transport vehicles (which are always unarmed, but are typically used to transport various smaller toys). Not all vehicles are available for use outside of one-player, which are the unarmed and transport vehicles.

The single-player campaign features seven principal room-based areas, each containing seven missions. Objectives vary between combat, racing and tasks involving everyday household objects.

Multiplayer supports up to four players through split-screen play, with configurations including one-on-one matches, two-on-two team battles and uneven team arrangements such as one-versus-one-versus-two. Competitive game types include conventional battles, tag and territory-control matches.

A battle mode, with other modes, is also available in the game for multiple players, allowing up to four players, with no online play.

== Development ==
When interviewed by Official Dreamcast Magazine the game's executive producer David Chomard stated that:

...the original idea [for Toy Commander] comes from Didier Chanfray, our artistic director, and Frédérick Raynal, our creative director. The basic idea was to fly small planes and fight in a house. Then the idea of having plenty of small missions with different styles of gameplay and vehicles was added. Finally, the storyline of the rebellion of toys was added.

Chomard said that No Cliché attempted to "avoid any comparison to Toy Story" but acknowledged that the studio were "big fans of Micro Machines, and it's true we took it as a reference of a good game with small cars". However, in a later interview with programmer Frantz Cournil it was stated that "Didier Chanfray, the art director, had the soul of a child and he loved the Toy Story computer-animated film", which led to him wanting to produce "a game in which everyone could remember their childhood and the toys they played with in their house".

In Germany, Toy Commander was promoted through the single "I Won't Let You Down" by the electronic music group Blue Nature, featuring singer Natalie. The accompanying music video incorporated animated imagery from the game, with Natalie filmed against a bluescreen to appear alongside its characters. According to a later retrospective, developer No Cliché authorised the use of the game's imagery but was not involved in producing the video's animation. The single reached number 60 on the German singles chart in December 1999.

== Reception ==
Reception

Aggregate score
Aggregator	Score
GameRankings	79%

Review scores
Publication	Score
AllGame	2/5
CNET Gamecenter	6/10
Edge	6/10
Electronic Gaming Monthly	8.375/10
Famitsu	25/40
Game Informer	8.75/10
GameFan	87%
GamePro	(S.L.) 4.5/5 (M.M.) 4/5
GameRevolution	A−
GameSpot	6.7/10
GameSpy	8.5/10
IGN	8.9/10
Next Generation	4/5

The game received favorable reviews according to the review aggregation website GameRankings. Brandon Justice of IGN said, "The strong sense of atmosphere can be attributed in large part to the game's subtle but spectacular visuals," and added, "Most of the time, the game finds a nice balance between challenging and competitively frustrating." Jeff Gerstmann of GameSpot said in his early review of the game, "Toy Commander does a nice job in the graphics department. The game has an extremely frustrating learning curve, since you must get used to the control while dealing with missions that require an extremely delicate touch"; he then remarked at the end of the review, "It should make for an excellent rental, but most players won't remain interested for more than three days."

In most of the causal reviews of Toy Commander, players enjoy the graphics more than the tricky control scheme on difficult levels. Adam Pavlacka of NextGen said of the game, "If there's trouble in paradise, it's that success in a given mission is often a matter of trial and error (instructions are often vague), and playing certain stages over and over can grow tiresome. Also, the difficulty level varies widely, with seemingly impossible tasks followed by something so simple that you crack it the first try. Still, you owe it to yourself to try this one." In Japan, where the game was ported for release under the name Totsugeki! Teketeke!! Toy Ranger (突撃！てけてけ!! トイ･レンジャー, Totsugeki! Teketeke!! Toi Renjā; lit. "Charge! Scrape Scrape!! Toy Ranger") on 6 January 2000, Famitsu gave it a score of 25 out of 40.

Toy Commander also received generally positive reviews from European publications. The French magazine Consoles + awarded the game 92%, praising its imaginative premise, detailed graphics and variety of missions, while noting that its demanding gameplay was better suited to experienced players. In Italy, Matteo Leccardi of Consolemania awarded it 87 out of 100, commending its originality, presentation and multiplayer features, although he criticised the steep learning curve associated with its controls. Spain's Revista Oficial Dreamcast gave it 8 out of 10, highlighting its creative use of everyday household environments. In Germany, MAN!AC awarded the game 78%. Sega Magazin was more enthusiastic, awarding it 85%. Reviewer Udo praised its imaginative household environments, varied missions and detailed graphics, although he criticised the strict time limits imposed on certain missions. Britain's Computer and Video Games was less enthusiastic, giving the game only three out of five stars.

According to NPD sales figures reproduced by Blast Processing!, Toy Commander had sold 188,427 copies in North America by March 2003.

Toy Racer cover art

== Additional releases ==
No Cliché developed two standalone seasonal missions for Toy Commander, distributed through demo discs accompanying Official Dreamcast Magazine. Toy Commander: Christmas Surprise featured a Christmas-themed mission in which players controlled a toy Santa Claus equipped with a jetpack to collect presents. The second mission, Toy Commander: Summer Special, was distributed in the United Kingdom on the Dream On Volume 11 demo disc and tasked players with clearing a beach of rubbish and dangerous creatures.

A racing spin-off, Toy Racer, was developed by No Cliché and published by Sega for the Dreamcast in Europe in December 2000. Based on the racing sections of Toy Commander, it supported local and online multiplayer for up to four players. Its single-player options were limited to practice and time trials, without computer-controlled opponents. The game was sold at a budget price, with Sega donating its proceeds from the French release to humanitarian charities.

The online multiplayer functionality of Toy Racer was revived on 3 December 2014 through community-operated servers.

== Legacy ==
Toy Commander was cited alongside Shenmue as an inspiration for the 2014 language-learning game Influent, which allows players to explore a three-dimensional household environment and examine individual objects to learn their names in different languages.
