= Murders in Venice =

- Developer: Cobrasoft
- Publisher: Infogrames
- Platforms: Amiga, Atari ST, Amstrad CPC MS-DOS
- Release: 1989
- Genre: Adventure
- Mode: Single-player

Murders in Venice (Meurtres a Venice) is an adventure video game developed by Cobrasoft and published in 1989 by Infogrames. It was released for the Amiga, Atari ST, Amstrad CPC, and MS-DOS.

== Plot ==
Players must investigate and foil a terrorist plot to detonate bomb in Venice.

== Reception ==
A review from Jeux gave the game 8 out of 10 points, praising its graphics and originality. The Games Machine gave the game a score of 75%. The review criticized the superficial gameplay but wrote that "The packaging is bursting with clues and the game's good graphics only enforce the high visual reputation of French software."

== See also ==
- Murders in Space, later installment in the Murders series
