= E3 2010 =

16th annual Electronic Entertainment Expo

Electronic Entertainment Expo 2010
- Official logo of E3 2010
- Genre: Multi-genre
- Begins: June 14, 2010
- Ends: June 17, 2010
- Venue: Los Angeles Convention Center
- Locations: Los Angeles, California
- Country: United States
- Previous event: E3 2009
- Next event: E3 2011
- Attendance: 45,600
- Organizer: Entertainment Software Association
- Filing status: Profit

The Electronic Entertainment Expo 2010 (E3 2010) was the 16th E3 held. The event took place at the Los Angeles Convention Center in Los Angeles, California. It began on June 14, 2010, and ended on June 17, 2010, with 45,600 total attendees. There was also an E3 event held in Sony's PlayStation Home.

== Layout ==
E3 2010 was held at the Los Angeles Convention Center with the show occupying the South and West Halls as well as the first floor.

=== West Hall ===
Sony Computer Entertainment and Nintendo had booths that were directly opposite of each other. Other notable developers and publishers located on this floor were Atlus, Atari, Bethesda, Sony Online Entertainment, and Capcom.

=== South Hall ===
The hall has three types of booths: large, medium and small. The large booths were occupied by Square Enix, MTV Games, Microsoft, Ubisoft, Disney Interactive Studios, and Electronic Arts. The medium booths were occupied by Sega, Konami, THQ, Warner Bros. Interactive, and Take-Two Interactive. The small booths were occupied by Namco Bandai and Tecmo Koei.

== List of featured games ==
The current list of games that were featured at E3 2010:

2K Games: Mafia II (PC, PS3, 360); Sid Meier's Civilization V (PC); Spec Ops: The Line (PC, PS3, 360); XCOM (PC, PS3, 360); Activision: Call of Duty: Black Ops (PS3, PC, 360, Wii); Goldeneye 007 (Wii); Guitar Hero: Warriors of Rock (PS3, 360, Wii); DJ Hero 2 (PS3, 360, Wii); DJ Hero 3D (3DS); Tony Hawk: Shred (PS3, 360, Wii); Transformers: War for Cybertron (PS3, 360, PC); Atari: Test Drive Unlimited 2 (PS3, 360, PC); The Witcher 2: Assassins of Kings (PC); Atlus: Etrian Odyssey III: The Drowned City (DS); Bethesda Softworks: Brink (PS3, 360, PC); Fallout: New Vegas (PS3, PC, 360); Hunted: The Demon's Forge (PS3, 360, PC); Rage (PS3, 360, PC); Capcom: 1942 (iPhone); Bionic Commando Rearmed 2 (PS3, 360); Dead Rising 2 (PS3, PC, 360); Ghost Trick: Phantom Detective (DS); Ghosts 'N Goblins: Gold Knights (iPhone); Marvel vs. Capcom 3: Fate of Two Worlds (PS3, 360); MotoGP 09/10 (PS3, 360); Ōkamiden (DS); Resident Evil: Revelations (3DS); Sengoku Basara: Samurai Heroes (PS3, Wii); Super Street Fighter IV 3D Edition (3DS); Disney Interactive Studios: Cars Toon: Mater's Tall Tales (Wii); Club Penguin: Elite Penguin Force: Herbert's Revenge (DS); Club Penguin: Game Day! (Wii); Epic Mickey (Wii); Guilty Party (Wii); Pirates of the Caribbean: Armada of the Damned (PS3, 360, PC); Toy Story 3: The Video Game (Wii, PS3, 360, PC); Tron Evolution (PC, PS3, 360); Tron: Legacy (iPhone); Electronic Arts: APB (PC); Battlefield: Bad Company 2 Vietnam (PC, 360, PS3); Bulletstorm (PS3, PC, 360); Crysis 2 (PS3, PC, 360); Dead Space 2 (PS3, PC, 360); EA Sports Active 2.0 (Wii); EA Sports MMA (PS3, 360); FIFA 11 (PC, PS2, DS, Wii, PSP, PS3, 360); Madden NFL 11 (PS2, PS3, PC, 360, Wii, PSP); Medal of Honor (PC, PS3, 360); NBA Jam (Wii); NCAA Football 11 (PS2, PS3, 360); Need for Speed: Hot Pursuit (PC, PS3, 360); NHL 11 (PS3, 360); NHL Slapshot (Wii); Spare Parts (PS3, 360); The Sims 3 (3DS, DS, PS3, Wii, 360); Tiger Woods PGA Tour 11 (PS3, Wii, 360); Konami: Castlevania: Harmony of Despair (XBLA); Castlevania: Lords of Shadow (PS3, 360); Def Jam Rapstar (Wii); Ninety-Nine Nights II (360); Pro Evolution Soccer 2010 (iOS); Rush'N Attack Ex-Patriot (PS3, 360); Saw II (PS3, 360); Silent Hill 8 (PS3, 360); Metal Gear Solid: Rising (PS3, PC, 360); Metal Gear Solid: Snake Eater 3D (3DS); LucasArts: Lego Star Wars III (DS, PC, PS3, PSP, Wii, 360); Monkey Island 2: LeChuck's Revenge (PC, PS3, 360); The Force Unleashed II (DS, PC, PS3, PSP, Wii, 360); Star Wars: The Old Republic (PC)	Microsoft: Codename: Kingdom (360); Fable III (360, PC); Gears of War 3 (360); Halo: Reach (360); Milo and Kate (360); Kinect games (360); Kinect Adventures (360); Kinect Joy Ride (360); Kinect Sports (360); Kinectimals (360); MTV Games: Dance Central (360); Rock Band 3 (PS3, 360, Wii, DS); Namco Bandai: Ace Combat: Joint Assault (PSP); Clash of the Titans (PS3, 360); Enslaved (PS3, 360); Dragon Ball: Origins 2 (DS); Naruto: Ultimate Ninja Storm 2 (PS3, 360); Pac-Man Party (Wii); Pac-Man and the Ghostly Adventures (TV Show); Ridge Racer (3DS); Splatterhouse (PS3, 360); Time Crisis: Razing Storm (PS3); Natsume Inc.: Harvest Moon DS: Grand Bazaar (DS); Lufia: Curse of the Sinistrals (DS); Rune Factory 3: A Fantasy Harvest Moon (DS); Nintendo: Animal Crossing: New Leaf (3DS); Donkey Kong Country Returns (Wii); Dragon Quest IX: Sentinels of the Starry Skies (DS); FlingSmash (Wii); Golden Sun: Dark Dawn (DS); Kid Icarus: Uprising (3DS); Kirby's Epic Yarn (Wii); The Legend of Zelda: Ocarina of Time 3D (3DS); The Legend of Zelda: Skyward Sword (Wii); Mario Kart 7 (3DS); Mario Sports Mix (Wii); Mario vs. Donkey Kong: Mini-Land Mayhem! (DS); Metroid: Other M (Wii); Nintendogs + Cats (3DS); Paper Mario: Sticker Star (3DS); Pilotwings Resort (3DS); Pokémon Ranger: Guardian Signs (DS); PokéPark Wii: Pikachu's Adventure (Wii); Professor Layton and the Mask of Miracle (3DS); Professor Layton and the Unwound Future (DS); Samurai Warriors 3 (Wii); Star Fox 64 3D (3DS); Steel Diver (3DS); Wii Party (Wii); Prope: Ivy The Kiwi (Wii, DS, Windows Phone); Sega: Conduit 2 (Wii); Crazy Taxi (PS3, 360); Phantasy Star Portable 2 (PSP); Sonic Adventure (PS3, 360); Sonic the Hedgehog 4: Episode I (PS3, 360, Wii, iOS); Sonic Colors (Wii, DS); Tournament of Legends (Wii); Valkyria Chronicles 2 (PSP); Vanquish (PS3, 360); Yakuza 4 (PS3); Seven45 Studios: Power Gig: Rise of the SixString (PS3, 360); Square Enix: Codename: Chocobo Racing 3D (3DS); Deus Ex: Human Revolution (PS3, PC, 360); Dungeon Siege III (PS3, 360, PC); Final Fantasy XIV (PS3, PC); Final Fantasy: The 4 Heroes of Light (DS); Front Mission Evolved (PS3, 360, PC); Kane & Lynch 2: Dog Days (PC, PS3, 360); Kingdom Hearts Birth by Sleep (PSP); Kingdom Hearts Re:coded (DS); Kingdom Hearts 3D: Dream Drop Distance (3DS); Lara Croft and the Guardian of Light (PS3, PC, 360); The 3rd Birthday (PSP)	Sony: Dead Nation (PS3); EyePet (PS3); Free Realms (PS3); God of War: Ghost of Sparta (PSP); Gran Turismo 5 (PS3); Hot Shots Tennis: Get a Grip (PSP); Heroes on the Move (PS3); Infamous 2 (PS3); Invizimals (PSP); Killzone 3 (PS3); Kung Fu Rider (formerly Slider) (PS3); LittleBigPlanet 2 (PS3); MotorStorm: Apocalypse (PS3); PlayStation Move games (PS3); SOCOM 4 (PS3); Sorcery (PS3); Sports Champions (PS3); Start the Party (PS3); TV Superstars (PS3); The Agency (PS3, PC); The Fight: Lights Out (PS3); The Last Guardian (PS3); The Shoot (PS3); The Sly Collection (PS3); Twisted Metal (PS3); SNK Playmore: The King of Fighters XIII (PS3, 360); THQ: Devil's Third (PS3, 360); de Blob: The Underground (Wii, PS3, 360, DS, 3DS); Homefront (PS3, PC, 360); Red Faction: Armageddon (PS3, 360, PC); Warhammer 40,000: Dark Millennium Online (PC); Warhammer 40,000: Space Marine (PS3, 360); WWE SmackDown vs Raw 2011 (360, PS2, PS3, PSP, Wii); WWE Online (PC); WWE All Stars (360, PS2, PS3, PSP, Wii); Tecmo Koei: Dead or Alive 3D (3DS); Fist of the North Star: Ken's Rage (PS3, 360); Samurai Warriors 3D (3DS); Trinity: Zill O'll Zero (PS3); Quantum Theory (PS3, 360); Warriors: Legends of Troy (PS3, 360); Ubisoft: Assassin's Creed: Brotherhood (PS3, PC, 360); Battle of Giants: Dinosaur Strike (3DS); Battle Tag; Driver: San Francisco (PS3, PC, X360, Wii, Mac OS X); Hollywood 61 (3DS); Just Dance 2 (Wii); Scott Pilgrim vs. the World: The Game (PS3, 360); Shaun White Skateboarding (PS3, PC, 360, Wii); Rayman Origins (PSN, XBLA, WiiWare, iOS); Tom Clancy's Ghost Recon: Future Soldier (PS3, PC, 360, Wii, DS, PSP); Tom Clancy's H.A.W.X. 2 (PC, PS3, 360, Wii); Tom Clancy's Splinter Cell: Chaos Theory (3DS); Tom Clancy's Ghost Recon (3DS); Valve: Portal 2 (PC, Mac, 360, PS3); Warner Bros. Interactive: Batman: The Brave and the Bold – The Videogame (DS, Wii); Batman: Arkham City (PS3, PC, 360); F.E.A.R. 3 (PC, PS3, 360); Game Party 4 (360); Legend of the Guardians: The Owls of Ga'Hoole (Wii, PS3, 360, DS); Lego Harry Potter: Years 1-4 (DS, PS2, PC, PS3, PSP, Wii, 360); The Lord of the Rings: Aragorn's Quest (DS, PS2, PS3, PSP, Wii); The Lord of the Rings: War in the North (PC, PS3, 360); Mortal Kombat (PS3, 360); Super Scribblenauts (DS)

== Notable exhibitors list ==
The list of notable exhibitors, including Atari who returned after pulling out of E3 2009 at the last minute:

- 2K Games
- Activision
- Atari
- Atlus
- Bethesda
- Capcom
- Codemasters
- Disney
- EA
- Eidos
- Konami
- LucasArts
- Majesco
- Microsoft
- Namco Bandai
- Natsume Inc.
- Nintendo
- Paradox
- Sega
- SNK
- Sony
- Square Enix
- Tecmo Koei
- THQ
- Ubisoft
- Valve
- Warner Bros.

== Press conferences ==
=== Microsoft ===
Microsoft held its press conference on June 14. Phil Spencer, vice president of Microsoft Studios, hosted the event for Kinect, and Hideo Kojima was a notable speaker.

=== Electronic Arts ===
Electronic Arts' press conference took place on June 14. Chief Executive Officer, John Riccitiello, has billed E3 2010 as being the "Biggest and Best Ever [E3 Expo]". He also adds that "All the best games and all the best developers will be together in LA to unveil new titles and celebrate the creativity and new technology that makes gaming so much fun".

=== Ubisoft ===
Ubisoft held a press conference on June 14. Multiple games were featured, including Assassin's Creed: Brotherhood, Driver: San Francisco, and Ghost Recon: Future Soldier. The conference was hosted by actor and comedian Joel McHale.

=== Nintendo ===
Nintendo held its conference on June 15. Shigeru Miyamoto appeared on stage and presented gameplay of their new game The Legend of Zelda: Skyward Sword, though control difficulties due to wireless interference occurred. Other notable speakers included Warren Spector, who went into detail about the upcoming game Epic Mickey. Satoru Iwata unveiled the upcoming Nintendo 3DS handheld system and allowed those in attendance to try it out.

=== Sony ===
Sony held its conference on June 15. The conference opened up, with Kaz Hirai talking about 3D, and Herman Hulst demoing Killzone 3. Sony also announced its plans to advertise PlayStation Move starting with a partnership with Coca-Cola. They also announced plans to start PlayStation Plus. LittleBigPlanet 2, Dead Space 2, and Tiger Woods PGA Tour 10 were demoed. Other games shown include Infamous 2, Medal of Honor, God of War: Ghost of Sparta, and Portal 2. The show closed with a teaser trailer, and demo for an upcoming Twisted Metal game.

=== Konami ===
Konami's press conference was held on June 16. The conference stood out with its numerous ill-received stunts and performances. In GameTrailers's top 15 most embarrassing moments of E3, they awarded the entire Konami press conference the award citing that they took up 10 of the 15 spots further referring to it as an "uncomfortable monstrosity".

== Notable appearances ==
=== Hideo Kojima ===
Hideo Kojima, creator of the Metal Gear Solid series, made an appearance at Microsoft's press conference. Prior to that he attended the third annual PlayStation.Blog E3 Meetup and gave away free bundles of Metal Gear Solid: Peace Walker.

=== Tetsuya Nomura ===
Tetsuya Nomura, director of Final Fantasy XV (then known as Versus XIII) and series director of Kingdom Hearts, made an appearance at E3. In addition he is met with Square Enix's Osaka-based Product Development Group 5 which recently worked on Kingdom Hearts Birth by Sleep. This was revealed by Shinji Hashimoto, a Japanese game producer for Square Enix, on his Twitter account.

=== Other notable appearances ===
Japanese game developers Hideki Kamiya, Yuji Naka, Suda51, and Shinji Mikami all went to E3 2010. While American game director David Jaffe, head of Eat Sleep Play, was also in attendance. Olympian Shaun White made an appearance at Ubisoft's press conference to promote the game Shaun White Skateboarding

=== Lucha Libre AAA ===
The Mexican professional wrestling promotion Lucha Libre AAA held two professional wrestling shows during the convention with one of the matches held during the convention being a match to determine the wrestler who would be featured on the cover for the game Lucha Libre AAA: Héroes del Ring with the winner being Dr. Wagner Jr..

== Pre-E3 hype ==
=== Valve ===
Valve claimed that they were going to be unveiling a "surprise" at E3 2010; they were originally set to hold an event regarding Portal 2 on June 14, 2010. The Portal 2 event was cancelled on June 1, 2010, with the "surprise" as its replacement. At Sony's press conference, the surprise was revealed to be Portal 2 on PlayStation 3, as well as Steamworks integration for the platform.

=== Square Enix ===
Square Enix claimed that they were going to be unveiling a new title in the Kingdom Hearts series; this was revealed by series director Tetsuya Nomura in an interview with Game Informer. This was revealed to be Kingdom Hearts 3D.

== Game Critics Awards ==
The Game Critics Awards is an independent group of 31 North American media outlets that cover the videogame industry, consisting of sites such as Kotaku, Joystiq, GameSpot, IGN and GameTrailers. Each year they award games showcased at E3 with various titles, they are also officially recognized by the Entertainment Software Association, the organizer of E3.

Best of Show	Best Original Game
Nintendo 3DS; Dance Central (360); Epic Mickey (Wii); Portal 2 (PS3, 360, PC); Rage (PS3, 360, PC)	Dance Central (360); Bulletstorm (PS3, 360, PC); Child of Eden (PS3, 360); Epic Mickey (Wii); Rage (PS3, 360, PC)
Best Console Game	Best Handheld Game
Rage (PS3, 360, PC); Epic Mickey (Wii); Infamous 2 (PS3); Kirby's Epic Yarn (Wii); Portal 2 (PS3, 360, PC)	God of War: Ghost of Sparta (PSP); Ghost Trick: Phantom Detective (DS); Ōkamiden (DS); Super Scribblenauts (DS); Valkyria Chronicles 2 (PSP)
Best PC Game	Best Hardware
Portal 2 (PS3, 360, PC); Civilization V (PC); Crysis 2 (PS3, 360, PC); Rage (PS3, 360, PC); Star Wars: The Old Republic (PC)	Nintendo 3DS; Kinect (360); PlayStation Move (PS3); Rock Band 3 Pro Guitars (PS3, 360, Wii); Rock Band 3 Keyboard (PS3, 360, Wii)
Best Action Game	Best Action/Adventure Game
Rage (PS3, 360, PC); Bulletstorm (PS3, 360, PC); Call of Duty: Black Ops (PS3, 360, PC); Gears of War 3 (360); Halo: Reach (360)	Portal 2 (PS3, 360, PC); Assassin's Creed: Brotherhood (PS3, 360, PC); Dead Space 2 (PS3, 360, PC); Epic Mickey (Wii); The Legend of Zelda: Skyward Sword (Wii)
Best Role Playing Game	Best Fighting Game
Star Wars: The Old Republic (PC); Deus Ex: Human Revolution (PS3, 360, PC); Fable III (360, PC); Fallout: New Vegas (PS3, 360, PC); The Witcher 2: Assassins of Kings (PC)	Marvel vs. Capcom 3: Fate of Two Worlds (PS3, 360); Mortal Kombat (PS3, 360); WWE All Stars (PS2, PS3, PSP, 360, Wii)
Best Racing Game	Best Sports Game
Need for Speed: Hot Pursuit (PS3, 360, PC); Gran Turismo 5 (PS3); MotorStorm: Apocalypse (PS3); Test Drive Unlimited 2 (PS3, 360, PC)	NBA Jam (Wii); EA Sports MMA (PS3, 360); Madden NFL 11 (PS3, 360); NCAA Football 11 (PS3, 360); NHL 11 (PS3, 360)
Best Strategy Game	Best Social/Casual Game
Civilization V (PC); Company of Heroes Online (PC); End of Nations (PC); Shogun 2: Total War (PC)	Rock Band 3 (PS3, 360, Wii); Dance Central (360); DJ Hero 2 (PS3, 360, Wii); Kinect Adventures (360)
Best Motion Simulation Game	Best Online Multiplayer Game
Dance Central (360); Child of Eden (PS3, 360); SOCOM 4 (PS3); The Legend of Zelda: Skyward Sword (Wii); Your Shape: Fitness Evolved (360)	Assassin's Creed: Brotherhood (PS3, 360, PC); Gears of War 3 (360); Halo: Reach (360); Medal of Honor (PS3, 360, PC); Star Wars: The Old Republic (PC)
