= Frédérick Raynal =

French video game designer

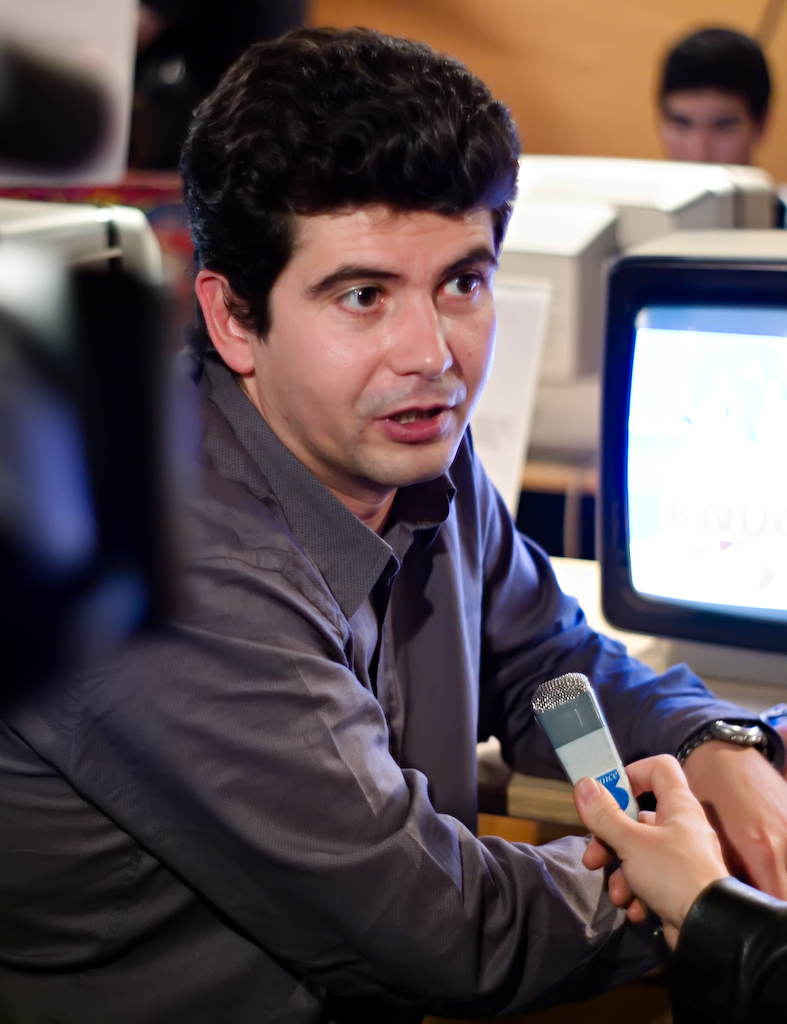
- Raynal in 2007
- Born: 15 May 1966 (age 60)
- Occupations: Video game designer, programmer
- Known for: Alone in the Dark; Little Big Adventure
- Spouse: Yaël Barroz
- Children: 2
- Website: www.ludoid.fr

Frédérick Raynal ([fʁedeʁik ʁɛnal]; born 1966) is a French video game designer and programmer, notable for his game developments in Infogrames, Adeline Software International and No Cliché. He is married to Yaël Barroz, who is also a game designer, with whom he has two children.

He developed Alone in the Dark, a game that established many conventions of the survival horror genre, and the Little Big Adventure series.

Raynal and other former Adeline members have repeatedly told fans that creating the third installment is made difficult by having to license or reacquire the rights to the franchise, which currently belong to Delphine Software International. In 2022, a newly formed game development company called [2.21] announced plans to develop the third installment alongside Raynal.

== Career ==
Frederick Raynal was born in 1966 in Brive-la-Gaillarde, Corrèze (France). Beginning in his high school years, Raynal made early LED games including Laser (1979) for the ZX81. Shifting to software programming and working at his father's computer shop, Raynal's first commercial game, Robix 500 (1983), sold around 80 copies. During his time working here, Raynal also designed a suite of Minitel emulators: Minitelec (1986) for the Amstrad 464 through 6128 (Minitelec and Transmitelec), the Amstrad CPC 6128 (Servitelec), and the PC-1512 (Minitelec Pro). He also produced graphics for the game PopCorn (1988), which was a moderate commercial success.

After joining the infant Infogrames he ported Alpha Waves (1990), a game which is considered the first true 3D platform game. The conversion, from Atari ST to MS-DOS, was actually a complete rewrite in C of the original Motorola 68000 assembly language code written by Christophe de Dinechin, after Raynal convinced Infogrames to make an exception to their policy of not porting assembly-language games. Convinced by his experience with Alpha Waves that the time was ripe for 3D graphics, he and his team soon went on to produce Alone in the Dark (1992), and worked on parts of the direct sequel (Alone in the Dark 2) before leaving the company. Alone in the Dark was a major contributor to the growth and success of Infogrames, and has since come to be widely regarded as a forefather of the survival horror genre. More importantly to Raynal himself, he became romantically involved with the game's graphic artist, Yaël Barroz, who gave birth to his first child shortly before Alone in the Dark was released.

Raynal formed Adeline Software International under Delphine Software International in 1993 with several former Infogrames members. With this new team, Raynal produced Little Big Adventure (1994), Time Commando (1996), and Little Big Adventure 2 (1997). He was also given special thanks on the PlayStation port of Fade to Black (1995).

=== No Cliché ===
No Cliché
- Formerly: Sega Software (1999)
- Type: Subsidiary
- Industry: Video games
- Predecessor: Adeline Software International
- Founded: 1999; 27 years ago
- Defunct: 2001
- Fate: Dissolved
- Headquarters: France
- Key people: Frédérick Raynal
- Products: Toy Commander; Toy Racer
- Parent: Sega

Raynal founded Sega Software in 1999 under Sega after they acquired Adeline, rendering it defunct and pivoted their goals to develop games for the Dreamcast; it was renamed No Cliché shortly after. Delphine Software International retained rights to their prior games.

No Cliché was best known for its first Dreamcast title, Toy Commander, released in 1999. In 2000, it produced Toy Racer and helped Raster Productions into coding localisation for the European release of its Dreamcast Quake III Arena port. In 2001, Sega Europe stopped development on many Dreamcast European games, causing the company to cease development on its current project at the time, Agartha, a survival horror game. No Cliché remained together for a little while after the cancellation, attempting to create a PC port of Toy Commander. However, the group split before it could be finished.

==== Games ====
- Toy Commander (1999)
- Quake III Arena (2000) (European release coding localisation)
- Toy Racer (2000)
- Agartha (cancelled 2001)

Raynal went on to form F4-Toys (later F4) with Bruno Heintz where he began work on an action adventure game Trium Planeta. The game was to follow the style of Little Big Adventure, but was cancelled after a few months. Raynal also worked briefly at Little World Studio before forming his current company, Ludoïd. In 1997, Raynal was credited in the short film, Double Jeu.

On March 13, 2006, Raynal along with Shigeru Miyamoto and Michel Ancel were knighted by French Minister of Culture and Communication, Renaud Donnedieu de Vabres, as Knights of Arts and Literature. It was the first time that video game developers were honored this distinction.

Later, Raynal was involved as a consultant in the design of Soul Bubbles, a game for the Nintendo DS, published by Eidos Interactive. He left the project in the spring of 2006 to start a new game with Ubisoft Montpellier: Battle Tag, a laser tag shooter game, which was released in November 2010. In 2010, he was linked to Treasure Hunter Institute, a MMO adventure game developed by Ubisoft. This project was canceled in April 2011.

In 2014, he founded a new studio, Gloomywood, and announced his new survival game 2Dark. The game was released in 2017.

Several years later, in September 2021, Raynal joined a newly formed studio named [2.21] for the production of a new installment to the Little Big Adventure franchise.

In 2023, Raynal developed Skew, a "real-time 3D endless spinner" and a spin-off of the video game The Last Worker made for the handheld game console Playdate.

As of 2026, Raynal is actively developing a reimagining of his 1988 game Popcorn as well as a new co-op edition of the same game titled "Popcorn DUEL" for the Mega Drive and PC. This includes a new spinner controller of his own design.

Raynal listed Age of Empires, Alien 8 on the ZX Spectrum, Alone in the Dark, Carmageddon II: Carpocalypse Now, Little Big Adventure 2, The Legend of Zelda: A Link to the Past, The Legend of Zelda: Ocarina of Time, Manic Miner on the ZX Spectrum, Marble Madness's arcade version, and Nibbler's arcade version as his favorite games in 2000.

== Games designed ==
Independent

- Laser (1979, ZX81)
- Robix 500 (1986, PC) (A.K.A. Robix)
- PopCorn (1988, PC)
- Skew (2023, Playdate)

With Infogrames

- The Toyottes (1990, PC port of an earlier Amiga game)
- SimCity CDTV (1990, PC port of an earlier Amiga CDTV game)
- Alpha Waves (1991, PC port of an Atari ST game by Christophe de Dinechin)
- Alone in the Dark (1992, PC)

With Adeline Software International

- Little Big Adventure (1994, PC/PlayStation) (A.K.A. Relentless: Twinsen's Adventure)
- Time Commando (1996, PC/PlayStation/Sega Saturn)
- Little Big Adventure 2 (1997, PC) (A.K.A. Twinsen's Odyssey)

With No Cliché

- Toy Commander (1999, Dreamcast)
  - Toy Commander: Christmas Surprise (2000, Dreamcast)
- Toy Racer (2000, Dreamcast)
- Agartha (canceled, Dreamcast)

With F4

- Trium Planeta (canceled)

With Mekensleep (as contractor)

- Soul Bubbles (2008, Nintendo DS) – consultant (2006)

With Ubisoft

- Battle Tag (2010) – creative director
- Treasure Hunter Institute (canceled)

With Ludoïd (as developer)

- bOxOn (2011, PC/iPad/iPhone/iPod)

With Gloomywood (as developer)

- 2Dark (2017, PC/PS4/Xbox One)

== Works cited ==
- "The 100 best games of all time". Edge. No. 80. Future plc. 2000.
