= Little Big Adventure 2 =

1997 video game

- European cover art
- Developer: Adeline Software
- Publishers: EU: Electronic Arts; NA: Activision
- Director: Frédérick Raynal
- Programmers: Sébastien Viannay; Serge Plagnol
- Artist: Didier Chanfray
- Writers: Frédérick Raynal; Marc Albinet; Didier Chanfray; Yaél Barroz; Laurent Salmeron
- Composer: Philippe Vachey
- Platforms: MS-DOS, Windows
- Release: NA: July 1, 1997; UK: August 22, 1997
- Genre: Adventure
- Mode: Single player

Little Big Adventure 2 is a 1997 adventure game developed by Adeline Software International and published by Electronic Arts.

Released in the UK in August 1997, it was also released in North America by Activision in July 1997, under the name Twinsen's Odyssey. LBA 2 sold over 300,000 copies worldwide. Versions for Sega Saturn and PlayStation were planned but never released.

The game is a sequel to Little Big Adventure (also known as Relentless: Twinsen's Adventure). LBA 2 was also the third game created under the label of Adeline Software International. The game features three-dimensional environments and full-motion video, and all of its music is in CD-DA quality.

In October 2011 Little Big Adventure 2 was re-released digitally on GOG.com and in October 2015 on Steam. In October 2021 both Little Big Adventure 1 and 2 engines source codes were released under the GPL.

== Gameplay ==
Little Big Adventure 2 has two viewing modes - for indoor scenes it uses a 3D isometric perspective like its predecessor, but for outdoor scenes a 3D perspective view is used. All characters and vehicles are 3D polygon-based objects, allowing for full rotation and movement abilities. The interior game field is divided in scenes (a small block of the game that is active). After completion of certain tasks the player is presented with a full motion video sequence. All text in the game is spoken by the characters. Essentially every character in the game is interactive and will respond differently when Twinsen speaks to them. Enemies are often performing tasks while the game world is active.

Like its predecessor, LBA 2 is real-time adventure. It combines several action game/arcade sequences and some elements from the role-playing game genre. The game's gameplay is partially free-roaming, allowing the player to travel around the islands once they have been "unlocked" by completing certain objectives; there are also many tasks which are optional or non-linear. Certain locations in the game are initially blocked from the player until they progress to a certain stage.

The world in LBA 2 is considered extremely large and varied for games of its time. There are three planets to visit, with Twinsun and Zeelich containing their own islands, each with their own unique graphical style. Compared to LBA which was based only on Twinsun but covered the entirety of that planet, LBA 2 only revisits Citadel Island and Desert Island from its predecessor. Emerald Moon serves as a setting for a small part of the game. Rather, the latter part of LBA 2 is set on Zeelich which is a two-layered planet with numerous points of interest on each layer.

== Plot ==
After Twinsen defeated Dr. FunFrock at the end of Little Big Adventure, peace had returned to Twinsun. The events of LBA 2 take place several years later, as a heavy thunderstorm develops over Citadel Island. Twinsen's Dino-Fly, a creature encountered in LBA, is struck by lightning mid-air and crash-lands in Twinsen and Zoe's garden. Twinsen is advised to seek help from Ker'aooc, a healing wizard who lives on Desert Island, but ferry crossings are cancelled due to inclement weather. He aids Bersimon, the island's weather wizard, who then uses magic to calm the storm. Immediately after the sky clears, alien creatures, who call themselves Esmers, land on the planet, under a false diplomatic guise. After hearing of a mass disappearance of the wizards' children, Twinsen searches for clues as to their whereabouts. The Esmers use their army to secretly capture Twinsun's Children and openly invite the Wizards to their home planet, Zeelich (which is revealed later to be a trap to capture them). After graduating as a wizard, Twinsen is informed by his master of the possible plot of the Esmers and is sent to investigate their planet by accepting their invitation to all Wizards.

Once Twinsen lands on Zeelich (which resembles Venus), he is accidentally identified by another Twinsunian in front of Esmer guards, who proceed to arrest him on the landing port. After tricking one of the guards with the help of another prisoner, Twinsen manages to escape imprisonment and escapes Zeelich in one of the Esmer spaceships. Returning to Twinsun, he crashes the spaceship the mountains of Citadel Island, where he is attacked by an Esmer soldier. After defeating him and making his way into the city, he discovers that the Esmers have taken over Twinsun and have imposed martial law. After going home to check on Zoe he finds out that Baldino has left him a protopack (Prototype Jetpack; it can hover, not fly) in the warehouse, he retrieves it and sets out to find his friend. Once making it to Desert Island he finds out that Baldino has disappeared; he proceeds to investigate his house and discovers that Baldino has built a spacecraft and for some reason went to Emerald Moon (Twinsun's moon). Twinsen visits the School of Magic and learns from his master that in order to proceed in his journey and face the Esmers, who prove to be more than he can handle, he must obtain a powerful artifact from beneath Citadel Island.

Twinsen then discovers the secret Esmer base on Desert Island beneath the Temple of Bù (an important location in the first game), then hijacks an Esmer spaceship to travel to Emerald Moon. At Emerald Moon, Twinsen frees Baldino from imprisonment at a Zeelichian base and they take Baldino's spacecraft to Zeelich.

Like Twinsun, Zeelich is home to four native sapient species: Sups, Francos, Wannies, and Mosquibees. Unlike Twinsun, it is a two-layered planet; the upper layer is located above a sea of toxic gas that plagues the planet, while The lower layer is located beneath the gas and is covered in a sea of lava. Its inhabitants await the day when a certain prophecy will be fulfilled, when Dark Monk, their shadow god, will emerge and restore Zeelich to its original hospitable state.

After assistance from Esmer rebels, Twinsen discovers that the Emperor of Zeelich had made a deal with the Dark Monk. In doing Dark Monk's bidding, Esmers were sent to take over Twinsun and the Emerald Moon. Twinsen eventually gathers together four fragments of a key which must be placed inside a temple on Celebration Island. Twinsen unmasks Dark Monk, who is really FunFrock, the villain from the first game. FunFrock deceived the Esmers so they could carry out his plan to destroy Twinsun in order for him to steal the powers of Sendell, the goddess of the planet. After overcoming FunFrock and his clone army, Twinsen attempts to stop Emerald Moon from crashing into the Twinsun but is unsuccessful even with Sendell's powers. Fortunately, the Esmers, who are freed of Dark Monk's deception, intervene and destroy the rocket engine upon Emerald Moon. Afterwards, the Esmers reconcile with the residents of Twinsun, while Twinsen and Zoe's baby is born.

== Music ==
The music of Little Big Adventure 2 is composed by the French composer Philippe Vachey.

== Reception ==
Reception

Review scores
Publication	Score
Computer Gaming World	5/5
Next Generation	4/5
PC PowerPlay	84%

Little Big Adventure 2 sold above 300,000 units by August 1999. According to GameSpot, poor sales of the preceding LBA game meant that Twinsen remained an obscure character in USA and resulted in the commercial failure of LBA2 in that market, in contrast to France where Twinsen was famous as a result of LBA's success. Some of the English voice acting was also criticized as corny compared to the original French dialogue.

Robert Coffey of Computer Gaming World said that the game has unparalleled sense of marvel and imagination, engaging story, and deft mix of action and adventure. GameSpot's Ron Dulin gave the game 8.1 out of 10, saying that the fans of adventure games will not miss this title. José Dias of Adventure Classic Gaming called Relentless: Twinsen's Adventure an original and intriguing adventure game and gave it a 4 out of 5.

Next Generation rated it four stars out of five, generally praising the gameplay and the story, and recommended to anyone who loves action/adventure games.

Little Big Adventure 2 was a runner-up for Computer Gaming World's 1997 "Adventure Game of the Year" award, which ultimately went to The Curse of Monkey Island. The editors called Little Big Adventure 2 a "charming" 3D action/adventure hybrid.
