= Soul Bubbles =

2008 video game

- PAL box art
- Developer: Mekensleep
- Publishers: WW: Eidos Interactive; JP: Interchannel
- Platform: Nintendo DS
- Release: NA: June 10, 2008; EU: June 13, 2008; AU: June 20, 2008; JP: July 16, 2009
- Genres: Puzzle, adventure, art game
- Mode: Single-player

Soul Bubbles is a puzzle video game for the Nintendo DS handheld console. It was developed by the French studio Mekensleep, and was published by Eidos Interactive in the PAL regions and North America in 2008. It was released in Japan in 2009 by Interchannel under the title Awatama (あわたま; lit. "Bubble Ball").

== Gameplay ==
The core gameplay involves transporting "spirits" within protective bubbles through varying environments. Bubbles are moved by being blown by the main "spirit herder" character based on stylus strokes on the DS touch screen. Bubbles may be created, joined, split, deflate and burst using animal "masks", worn by the spirit herder, again using the touch screen. These mechanics are then used to navigate through levels featuring wind currents, enemies, water, fire, gases, spikes, sticky surfaces, and further complexities. At the same time there are collectible "stardust" items that contribute to the player's end-of-level score, and "calabash" that unlock additional levels.

== Plot ==
The player plays as a young shaman apprentice, whose duty is to care for lost souls. The player must create protective bubbles to keep the souls safe. The game contains eight worlds and 40 levels.

The player has to complete each level by moving all the spirits to the Gateway Cube, where the souls will forever rest, while collecting stardust and Calabash.

== Development ==
The team responsible for final game design consists of Olivier Lejade and Omar Cornut, with the help of experienced game developer Frédérick Raynal. Raynal left the team in spring of 2006, to start working with Ubisoft. The game was initially released in North America exclusively through Toys "R" Us retail stores. In late 2008, a demo of the game was made available on the DS Download Service of the Wii Nintendo Channel.

== Reception ==
Reception

Aggregate score
| Aggregator | Score |
|---|---|
| Metacritic | 78/100 |

Review scores
| Publication | Score |
|---|---|
| Edge | 7/10 |
| Eurogamer | 8/10 |
| Famitsu | 28/40 |
| GameSpot | 7/10 |
| GameSpy | 4/5 |
| GameZone | 8.6/10 |
| IGN | (UK) 8.4/10 (US) 8/10 |
| Nintendo Power | 6.5/10 |
| Official Nintendo Magazine | 93% |
| VideoGamer.com | 8/10 |

The game received "generally favorable reviews" according to the review aggregation website Metacritic. N-Europe described it as a "wonderfully calming" game and feels like the "title the DS was built for". In Japan, Famitsu gave it a score of all four sevens for a total of 28 out of 40.

The game was a nominee for several Nintendo DS-specific IGN awards, including Best Puzzle Game, Best New IP, and Most Innovative Design. It was nominated for the 9th Annual Game Developers Choice Awards "Best Debut" award and the British Academy of Film and Television Arts Video Game Awards "Handheld" category. It was number one on Gamasutra's 2008 top 5 overlooked games.
