= George Ethelbert Carter =

First black judge born in Canada

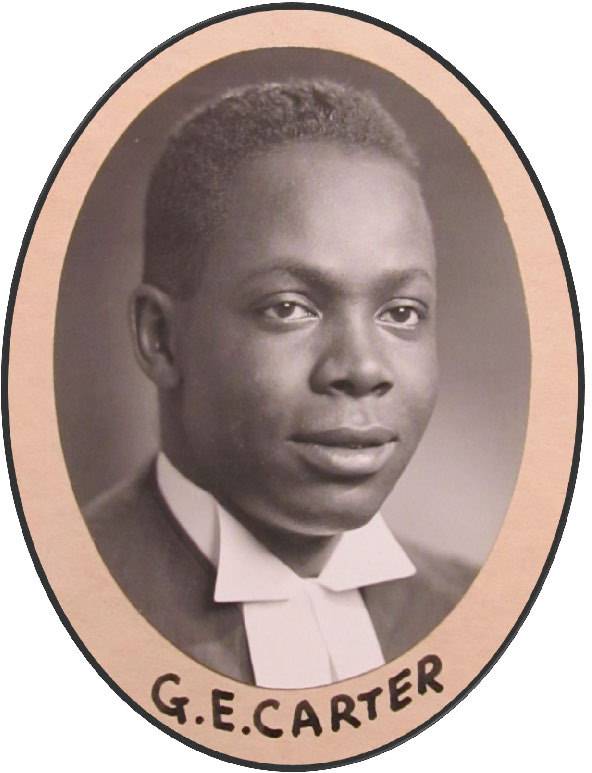
Osgoode Hall Law School, graduation photo, 1948.

George Ethelbert Carter, CM was the first Canadian-born black judge.

George Ethelbert Carter was born in Toronto on August 1, 1921. He was the oldest of 14 children born to John and Louise Carter, who came to Toronto from Barbados just after World War I.

Carter completed his undergraduate studies at Trinity College, at the University of Toronto, and graduated in 1944. He was then called up for active service in World War II and was on his way to Europe when the war ended.

A graduate of Osgoode Hall Law School in 1948, Carter had his own law firm and practised in the areas of real estate, criminal and family law for 31 years. He was appointed an Ontario provincial court judge in 1979 and later served with the Ontario Court of Justice for 16 years.

He worked as a porter to pay his tuition to law school, and served with the Canadian Army in World War II. He was instrumental in establishing Legal Aid in the Province of Ontario.

== Legacy ==
A bust of Justice Carter was unveiled at the Osgoode Hall Library in May 2014. A television documentary movie was made about his life in 2010, and he was named to the Order of Ontario in 2014.

George died June 7, 2018, peacefully at home at age 96
