= George Carter (Australian footballer) =

Australian rules footballer

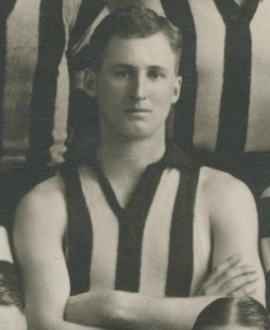
- Carter during his Collingwood career

Personal information
- Full name: George Henry Carter
- Born: 25 March 1910; Violet Town, Victoria
- Died: 12 February 1971 (aged 60); Forest Hill, Victoria
- Original team: Maffra
- Height: 187 cm (6 ft 2 in)
- Weight: 83 kg (183 lb)

Playing career^{1}
Years	Club	Games (Goals)
1932–1937	Collingwood	49 (60)
1938–1940	Hawthorn	33 (25)
Total		82 (85)
- ^{1} Playing statistics correct to the end of 1940.

George Henry Carter (25 March 1910 – 12 February 1971) was a former Australian rules footballer who played with Collingwood and Hawthorn in the Victorian Football League (VFL).
