= George D. Carter =

American politician

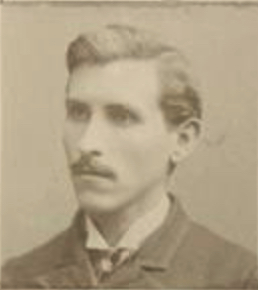

Member of the Virginia House of Delegates from Henrico County
- In office December 2, 1891 – December 6, 1893
- Preceded by: Joseph B. Davis
- Succeeded by: William J. Binford

Personal details
- Born: George Dillwyn Carter; September 18, 1867 Henrico, Virginia, U.S.
- Died: July 15, 1951 (aged 83) Richmond, Virginia, U.S.
- Party: Democratic

George Dillwyn Carter (September 18, 1867 – July 15, 1951) was an American politician who served in the Virginia House of Delegates.
