= Little Big Adventure =

1994 video game

- European MS-DOS cover art
- Developer: Adeline Software International
- Publishers: Electronic Arts: EU: Electronic Arts; NA/AU: Activision; JP: Electronic Arts Victor; DotEmu (Android, iOS)
- Director: Frédérick Raynal
- Producer: Randall Breen
- Designer: Didier Chanfray; Laurent Salmeron; Yaël Barroz; Frédérick Raynal
- Programmers: Frantz Cournil; Olivier Lhermite; Serge Plagnol; Frédérick Raynal; Laurent Salmeron
- Artists: Didier Chanfray; Yaél Barroz; Jean-Marc Torroella
- Writer: Jean-Jacques Poncet
- Composer: Philippe Vachey
- Platforms: MS-DOS, PC-98, FM Towns, PlayStation, Android, iOS
- Release: 1994: MS-DOS; NA/FRA: 1994; AU: 18 November 1994; UK: 16 December 1994; PC-98; JP: 15 December 1995; FM Towns; JP: 15 December 1995; PlayStation; JP: 19 July 1996; UK: 28 March 1997; Android, iOS; WW: 27 March 2014
- Genre: Action-adventure
- Mode: Single player

Little Big Adventure is a 1994 action-adventure game developed by Adeline Software International. It was published in Europe by Electronic Arts, and by Activision in North America, Asia and Oceania under the name Relentless: Twinsen's Adventure. The game was initially released on CD-ROM and some time later on floppy disks; the CD-ROM version features full-motion video, music and speech whereas the floppy disk version has MIDI music files and still images to replace the videos. The game was later ported to the PC-98 and FM Towns and was released in Japan in 1995. It was released for the PlayStation in Japan and Europe in 1996 and 1997 respectively, and to Android and iOS devices in 2014.

In 1997, a PC-only sequel was released under the name of Little Big Adventure 2 (also known as Twinsen's Odyssey).

On October 20, 2015, an "Enhanced Edition" developed by DotEmu was released on Steam, alongside a re-release of the original game. In October 2021 both Little Big Adventure 1 and 2 engines source code were released under the GPL.

== Gameplay ==
Little Big Adventure is a real-time pseudo-3D isometric action-adventure game. All characters and vehicles in the game, including some props in the world, are real 3D polygon-based objects, performing actions within 2D pre-rendered environments.

LBA is a real-time adventure. It combines several action game/arcade sequences and some elements from the role-playing game genre. The game's gameplay is partially free-roaming, allowing the player to travel around the islands once they have been "unlocked" by completing certain objectives or solving certain puzzles; there are also many tasks which are optional or non-linear. Certain locations in the game are initially blocked from the player until they progress to a certain stage, such as the islands in the Northern Hemisphere and fortresses on several of the islands in the Southern Hemisphere. LBA is set only on the planet of Twinsun but covered the entirety of that world, while its successor LBA 2 only includes a couple locations (Citadel Island and Desert Island) on Twinsun. While LBA 2 is more linear in progression, LBA has quests where the player will revisit previously explored locations in both hemispheres.

The player-character, Twinsen, can be switched between four different "behaviour modes" (Normal, Athletic/Sporty, Aggressive, and Discreet), each changing the character's abilities and interactions with the game world. Combat in the game is mainly conducted using the Magic Ball, a glowing ball of energy which the player throws towards enemies, the trajectory and angle of the ball changing depending on the mode the player is in. Switching to the "Aggressive" mode also allows Twinsen to engage in combat via punching and kicking. After completion of certain tasks the player is presented with a full-motion video cut-scene. All text in the game is spoken by the characters. Essentially every character in the game is interactive and will respond differently when Twinsen speaks to them. Enemies are often performing tasks while the game world is active.

The game features an autosave mechanic, which was a departure from the usual manual save system seen in most games of that time.

== Plot ==
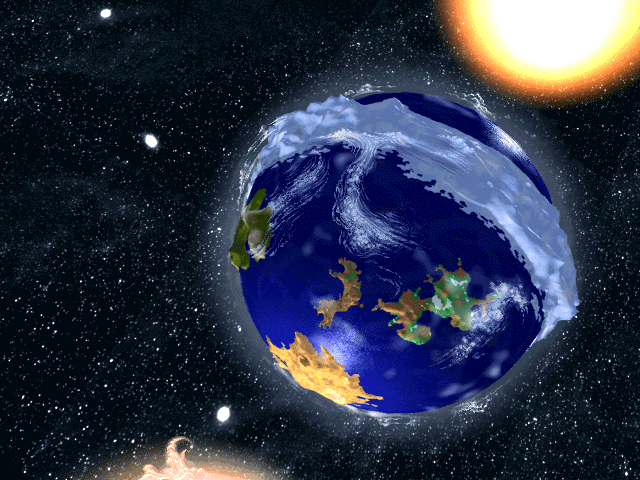
The planet Twinsun, located between two suns

The game is set on the fictional planet Twinsun, a world which is held in a suspended orbit between two suns resulting in a polar region around its equator. Four different sentient species populate Twinsun: Quetches, Spheros, Grobos, and Rabbibunnies. Quetches are anatomically similar to humans except that they all possess ponytails, Spheros are short spherical creatures, Grobos resemble anthropomorphic elephants, and Rabbibunnies are rabbit-like humanoids.

In the introduction, it is explained that all peoples of Twinsun have been herded into the Southern hemisphere by a brutal tyrant called Dr FunFrock, who has subjugated the planet by developing an army of clones which travel using teleport machines which he has dispersed around the planet. The player character is a young Quetch named Twinsen, who has been incarcerated in an asylum on the fortress-like Citadel Island because of his prophetic dreams about the end of the world.

Twinsen escapes from the asylum and returns to his house which he shares with his girlfriend Zoe. When Dr FunFrock's clones arrive to re-arrest him, Zoe hides Twinsen from them and is arrested herself. As Twinsen travels between the islands of the planet, seeking to find a way of overcoming FunFrock's clone army and freeing Zoe, he discovers that his strange dreams are in fact part of the Prophecy, a legendary tale regarding a being known as Sendell who is said to inhabit the core of the planet and watch over the people of Twinsun. Twinsen's dreams are in fact telepathic messages sent by Sendell, who chose his ancestors to help her watch over the planet centuries prior and is now contacting Twinsen (as the current descendant of his family line) to warn the inhabitants of the planet of the danger posed by FunFrock. Realising that finding FunFrock and fulfilling the Prophecy is the only way to recover Zoe, Twinsen recovers artifacts from various locales in the Southern Hemisphere in order to boost his magic power which enables him to fight FunFrock's clones.

Twinsen teams up with a group of rebels resisting the rule of FunFrock. Accompanying the rebels when they attack FunFrock's polar fortress to liberate a rebel officer held in captivity, this gains Twinsen passage through to the Northern Hemisphere. In the Northern Hemisphere, FunFrock has established mutant and teleportation facilities enabling him to quell unrest anywhere on the planet. Twinsen sabotages these facilities at the bequest of locals disenchanted with FunFrock's rule, and in return they help him break into FunFrock's main fortress where clones are produced. There, Twinsen finds Zoe seemingly locked in a jail, but she is revealed to be a clone created by FunFrock as bait, and FunFrock reveals that with Twinsen safely locked up where he cannot fulfil his part of the Prophecy, FunFrock is free to drill through to the Well of Sendell, deep in the planet's core, where he hopes to encounter Sendell and gain the godly powers she possesses for himself.

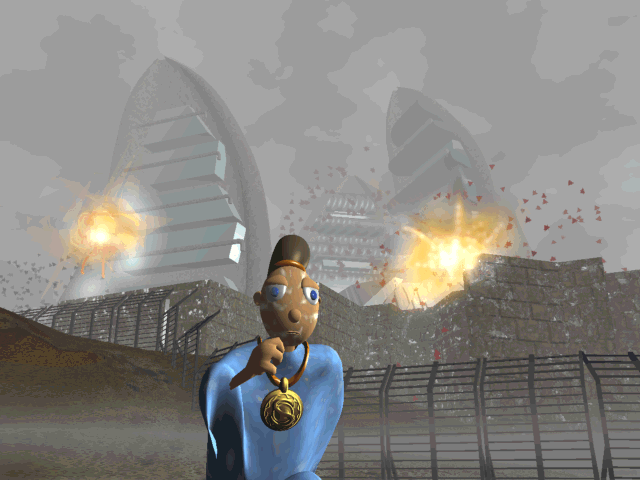
Twinsen fleeing as Dr. FunFrock's fortress explodes

Twinsen escapes from the clutches of FunFrock's clones and succeeds in blowing the fortress up, clearing the way for him to fight through FunFrock's construction workers to reach the Well of Sendell. FunFrock waits with Zoe at the entrance to the Well, since his drilling operations cannot break through the Well's seal, telling Twinsen that he'll spare Twinsen and Zoe if he opens the Well for FunFrock to advance and reach Sendell. Twinsen pushes FunFrock off the side of a cliff during a sword fight and opens the Well in order to complete the Prophecy, inadvertently allowing a surviving FunFrock access as well. Twinsen defeats FunFrock in a final confrontation, and him and Zoe encounter Sendell, a being appearing to consist purely of glowing electrical energy, who thanks them for saving a gestalt entity which she is protecting in the core of the planet. Sendell uses her powers to allow Twinsen and Zoe to fly back to the surface, where the inhabitants of the planet have prepared a celebration in Twinsen's honour.

=== Characters ===
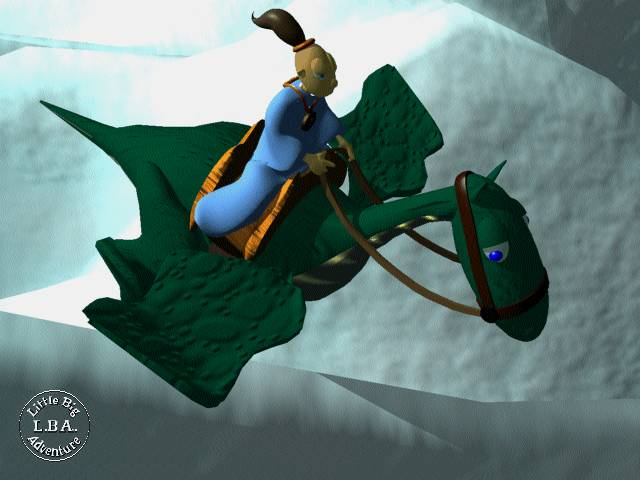
Twinsen riding his Dino-Fly

Twinsen is the hero of the game. The chosen one of the planet, heir to its prophecy, he must gather magical objects and sabotage FunFrock's reign. He is voiced by Sylvain Caruso in French, and Dana Westberg in English.

Zoe is Twinsen's girlfriend. She is captured by two Grobo clones shortly after Twinsen escapes from the asylum. Near the end of the game, Twinsen rescues what he thinks is Zoe, but turns out to be a clone. Twinsen rescues the real Zoe at the very end of the game. She is voiced by Julie Bataille in French, and Trish Kessler-Caffrey in English.

Jerome Baldino (better known as Baldino) is the local inventor on Proxima Island. He aids Twinsen in the game with his protopack, which the player must use to rob a museum. He only appears for a short time, though he plays a bigger part in Little Big Adventure 2. He is voiced by Sylvain Caruso in French, and Christian Erickson in English.

FunFrock is the main antagonist of the game. He is the dictator of Twinsun who controls the planet using three powers: cloning, teleportation and mutant breeding. His true goal is to achieve the God-like status by destroying Sendell, the goddess of the planet. After Twinsen defeats him, the planet is peaceful again, and no longer under the reign of terror. It is revealed in Little Big Adventure 2 that FunFrock survived. He is voiced by Pierre-Alain de Garrigues in French, and Christian Erickson in English.

Dino-Fly is a dinosaur with wings, roosting on top of Tippet Island. He says he has been waiting for the heir (who is Twinsen) for centuries. He helps Twinsen get to the other islands of the northern hemisphere of Twinsun. He is voiced by Pierre-Alain de Garrigues in French, and Christian Erickson in English.

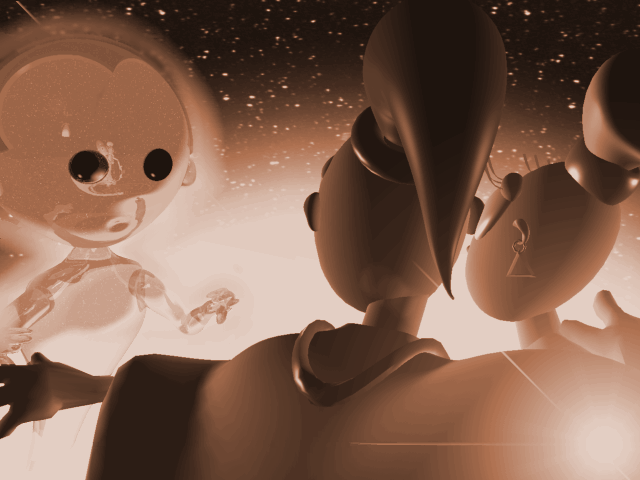
The goddess Sendell appearing to Twinsen and Zoe

Sendell is the goddess of Twinsun. She calls Twinsen for help in his dreams, warning him of FunFrock's dictatorship. She and other Sendells are watching over a Stellar Entity that is in gestation in the centre of Twinsun. She is seen briefly in the ending cutscene. She is voiced by Julie Bataille in French, and Trish Kessler-Caffrey in English.

== Development ==
Frédérick Raynal, ex-Infogrames designer/lead programmer had grown disillusioned with Infogrames reluctance to listen to new ideas and concepts while working on the Alone in the Dark series, so founded his own development house where he was able to use these new ideas and concepts to create their debut game, Little Big Adventure.

In an interview with Edge magazine, lead coder Serge Plagnol stated that the U.S. division of Electronic Arts repeatedly requested that Twinsen be changed into a "much tougher character" and for him to "kick ass". Adeline Software International refused because the changes wouldn't have suited the game's story.

The music for the game was composed by Philippe Vachey who also composed music for Little Big Adventure 2.

In 1995, Atari Corporation realized a deal with EA to bring titles from their catalog to the Atari Jaguar CD, with Little Big Adventure among them but it was never released due to the commercial and critical failure of the Atari Jaguar platform.

In August 2011, co-founder of Adeline Software Didier Chanfray said in an interview that downloadable re-releases of both Little Big Adventure and its sequel were "under negotiation". He also added that a "remix" of the game was being considered for release on touch-pad devices.

On 11 October 2011, the game was re-released for download by GOG, where it is available for both the Windows (XP, Vista, 7) and Mac OS X (10.6.8 or newer) platform.

In December 2011, discussion of a LBA1 remake was revealed in an interview with Frédérick Raynal, Sébastien Viannay and Didier Chanfray posted on GOG.

On 26 and 27 March 2014 respectively, an Android and iOS version of Little Big Adventure were released.

By September 2021, a new installment to the series was announced by a newly formed team named [2.21]. It was released in 2024 as a remake of the original game, titled "Little Big Adventure – Twinsen’s Quest".

== Reception ==
Reception

Review scores
Publication	Score
Edge	9/10
Next Generation	4/5
Secret Service	100%

Little Big Adventure was a commercial hit, with sales of 320,000 units by February 1997. By August 1999, its global sales had surpassed 500,000 units. However, the game was commercially unsuccessful in the United States, where it sold 30,000 units. Writer Daniel Ichbiah blamed this on Electronic Arts' "incoherent marketing" of the game, and Frédérick Raynal criticized the publisher's decision to give Little Big Adventure a more aggressive name and cover artwork, and to portray combat in its advertisements.

Next Generation gave the PC version of the game four stars out of five, and said that the game has enough challenge to keep players from start to finish despite noting some puzzles being "light".

Little Big Adventure was named the 38th best computer game ever by PC Gamer UK in 1997. The editors called it "endearingly entertaining". In 1996, GamesMaster ranked Little Big Adventure 91st in their "Top 100 Games of All Time".
