= George Carter (Essex cricketer) =

English cricketer

Personal information
- Full name: George Carter
- Born: 10 May 1901; Stoke Newington, London, England
- Died: 29 January 1994 (aged 92); Siesta Key, Florida, United States
- Batting: Right-handed
- Bowling: Right-arm medium

Domestic team information
- Years: Team
- 1921–1923: Essex

Career statistics
Competition	FC
Matches	7
Runs scored	163
Batting average	16.30
100s/50s	–/–
Top score	44*
Balls bowled	24
Wickets	–
Bowling average	–
5 wickets in innings	–
10 wickets in match	–
Best bowling	–
Catches/stumpings	3/–
- Source: Cricinfo, 29 December 2010

George Carter (10 May 1901 – 29 January 1994) was an English cricketer. Carter was a right-handed batsman who bowled right-arm medium pace. He was born in Stoke Newington, London.

Carter made his first-class debut for Essex in the 1921 County Championship against Nottinghamshire. Carter played 6 County Championship matches for Essex in the 1921 season, the last of which coming against Kent in July. In 1923, he played his final first-class fixture for the county, his first since 1921, against the touring West Indians. In his 7 first-class matches, he scored 163 runs at a batting average of 16.30, with a high score of 44*.

He died at Siesta Key, Florida, United States on 29 January 1994.
