= George Carter III =

American inventor

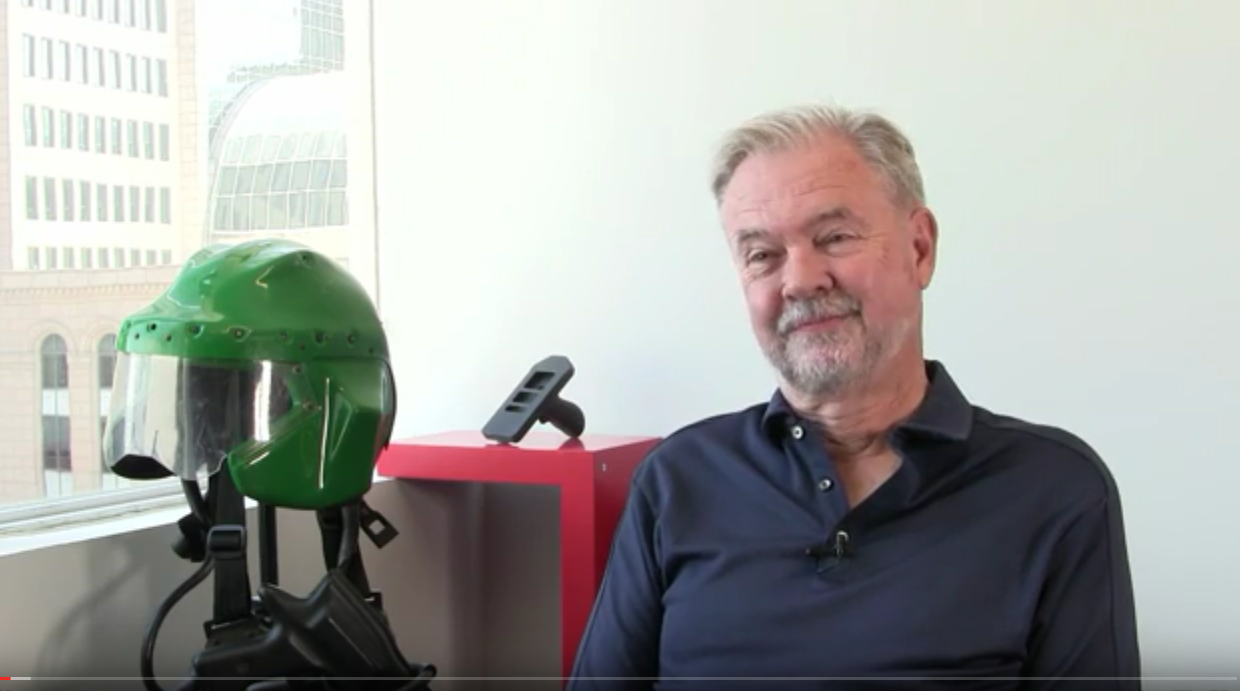
- Born: July 28, 1945 (age 81)
- Occupations: Inventor & Entrepreneur
- Known for: Creator of Laser Tag
- Website: carterinventions.com

George Carter III (born July 28, 1945) is an inventor who created Photon, the first commercialized version of laser tag, as well as other inventions such as the personal watercraft and certain versions of all-terrain vehicles. George Carter invented the Photon after being inspired by Star Wars.

== Baja Raceway ==
In 1969 Carter's first business, prior to Photon, was a dirt-track grand prix concession car course in Phoenix called the Baja Raceway. The racetrack was across the street from an amusement park called Legend City, which included the music venue Compton Terrace. Jess Nicks, Stevie Nicks's dad, owned the amphitheater, and Fleetwood Mac played the venue several times, beginning on August 29, 1980. As Carter recalls, the band and associates arrived in limousines at the Baja Raceway after the show. It was around midnight, and the track was closing.

"We stayed open just for them," Carter told Vice. "We stayed open 'til like two in the morning. They spent a bunch of money and had a great time. One of the people with them was their accountant [or] manager—he gave me a card and said 'get in touch with me, we're interested in this business.' I'd heard that a hundred times before, that people were interested. But he actually called me a couple months later."

Baja Raceway was the first concession track anywhere that had two-seat vehicles. This led to bigger, faster vehicles that Carter went on to design and build himself instead of going to third parties to purchase the vehicles. Creating them himself created the ability to better control the go-kart experience and ensure maximum revenue by reducing the likelihood of vehicles being out of service due to maintenance. The tracks that came after the first Baja Raceway were made better, and the team created bigger, faster vehicles, using full-sized automotive tires and wheels. The Grand Prix tracks were very successful, and led Carter to Dallas, and with celebrity investors, included Lindsay Buckingham, Mick Fleetwood, the actress Beverly Sassoon and others ultimately helped fund a new "chaparral grand prix" race track in Dallas, chosen for its growing economy and cheap land. At the grand opening, Lindsay Buckingham gave away signed helmets to those present.

== Photon / Laser Tag ==
Photon is Carter's most well-known, and most successful, invention. Born from Carter's love of Star Wars, it was while he was watching movies that Carter got the idea to create a laser tag system that could bring to real life the fun of cops and robbers little boys played as children. Carter's previous venture, the Grand Prix tracks, had done well and after the location in Dallas was closed and the land sold for more than three times its worth, he went back to the laser tag idea that he had shelved several years earlier because technology was not yet where it needed to be for the game to be possible. The first Photon location was opened on March 28, 1984, at 12630 E Northwest Highway, Suite 300 in Dallas, Texas.

Carter revealed in an exhaustive interview aired by Newsweek on 15 July 1984 that he was investing considerably in quickly expanding the game centres across United States. In 1985 Photon was featured in a segment on ABC's 20/20 news program. The success of Photon was undeniable with the lure of playing in a videogame-like experience fun for young adults. Players would enter into the arena where they would be issued passports that were used by the Photon computers and would purchase the tickets used for play. Players would enter into the Photon staging area where they would put on the equipment, and then enter into. Chicago Tribune reported in July 1986 how George Carter himself imported the Photon game centre in Palatine. The report described the game centre as a "futuresque war zone". At that time, as per the report, Carter had opened Photon game centres in nine locations across America. In an October 1986 report on Carter done by The Washington Post, he revealed that by that time, 16 Photon centres had been started, with 15 undergoing completion and above of 60 other centres had been awarded to contractors across the globe.

The New York Times reported in August 1998 that George Carter invented the Photon after getting inspired by Star Wars, and had expanded the reach of laser tag game at a fast pace. "Mr. Carter built a string of Photon Laser Centers in Dallas. There are now more than 500 laser tag arenas, from Tampa, Fla., to Sydney, Australia, up from only 8 five years ago," mentioned the report. In a March 1987 interview to The Inquirer, Carter said that getting an appropriate space to implement the laser tag game remained the bigger challenge of bringing the entertainment to masses. He said, "The real estate is tough... The biggest problem is not the conception of the game per se. It is the idea of a public gathering place that caters to young adults, and brings with it all the problems that are imagined by the City Fathers to go with this sort of crowd." As per a July 1998 report in The Wall Street Journal, Carter eventually left the business of developing these game centres as the expenditures involved in expanding the business became unmanageable. In 2010, Dallas News reported that Carter was working on an invention titled the Airstation, a robotic equipment that could automatically fill a vehicle's tyres and perform other necessary air pressure checks.

Carter imagined Photon as something cool enough that people would want to watch, so the arenas had observation decks for onlookers (laser tag was "a lot more theme-y back then than it is now"), and some were equipped with actual lasers for laser shows. For a brief moment in time, there was even a tie-in TV show produced in Japan, which Carter lovingly described as "probably the world's worst semi-animated TV show," adding, judiciously, "it was terrible." A home version of Photon was the top selling toy in the country for Christmas of 1986.

== Trak Vak / Race Track Dryer ==
The race track dryer, Trak Vak, was created by Carter and was a prototype track-drying piece of equipment that was used by NASCAR from 1999 to 2003. The machine looked like a typical truck, with the drying apparatus where the bed of the truck would have been and was driven by a 27 hp motor with 12 pickup points to suction up the rainwater into a 600-gallon holding tank. Testing of Trak Vak was tested on eleven sanctioned tracks including NASCAR, IRL, and CART events, and Trak Vak was used in Indy 500 events in 2000 and 2001.

The drying system was similar to how Zamboni's work, scraping water back to a roller, that then sucked the water up, storing it in a tank, which was very different than the system that NASCAR had used, which was to try and use hot air to evaporate the water off of the track. The track dryer sucked up the water, putting it into a tank and was a much more effective way to dry the tracks at a much higher speed—the Trakvak was designed to operate at speed up to 60 miles per hour. Unfortunately, NASCAR only purchased the single machine.

== TZUUM ==
According to LaunchDFW.com Carter is working on a new augmented reality competitive combat and strategy mobile game called Tzuum, currently in development for iOS. Carter has named his laser-tag sequel Tzuum — pronounced zoom — as a tribute to Sun Tzu, the ancient Chinese general, philosopher and author of The Art of War. While Photon had to be used in a controlled environment using, cumbersome equipment and the computer technology of the time, Tzuum is the next generation of laser tag and uses smartphones as its computer. Modern smartphones have many times more computing power than the technology of the 1980s. "It's a completely different technology than has ever been used for laser tag," said Carter. "It works on the orientation sensors and the GPS in the phone. It's called geo-pairing, which is a concept that the military developed probably about 10 years ago."

According to Engadget the augmented reality game that uses the real world environment the player is in and adds additional virtual objects to it in real-time via a device such as a tablet or a phone. AR causes aspects of the real world to become digitally interactive, such as placing a Pokémon character on a hill and allowing a player to capture it by climbing that hill and virtually grabbing it.
