= Murders in Space =

1990 video game

- Developer: Hitech Productions
- Publishers: Infogrames, Ziggurat Interactive
- Designer: Bertrand Brocard
- Platforms: MS-DOS, Amiga, Atari ST Windows
- Release: 1990: Amiga, ST, MS-DOS; 2020: Windows
- Genre: Adventure
- Mode: Single-player

Murders in Space (French: Meutres dans l'espace) is an adventure video game developed by Hitech Productions and published in 1990 in Europe by Infogrames for MS-DOS, Amiga, and Atari ST. The player navigates a space station to investigate and identify a murderer in the course of 24 in-game hours. The game was designed by French developer Bertrand Brocard, and was the last of five games in the Murders series of detective titles by the developer. Upon release, Murders in Space received average reviews, with critics praising the visual presentation and design, although some critics expressed that the game was too challenging and featured linear gameplay. In 2020, Ziggurat Interactive republished the game for Windows.

== Gameplay ==
Players navigate a space station to interact with characters and locate clues.

Murders in Space is an adventure game in which players are tasked to identify all the secrets of the inhabitants of the Pegasus space station, and leave the space station within a time limit. The game is played within 24 in-game hours that progress events on the station, including changes to the position of the characters, who undertake routines and jobs across the station. These events create obstacles to progress; characters are not always available at all times, and over time, crew members will be murdered. Every in-game hour, the player will be transported back to the centre of the station, requiring them to explore the area to see what changes have occurred. At any time in the game, players fill in a questionnaire, with the questions providing prompts for the player to search for clues, and the answers serving as the method to complete the game.

The game is controlled using the mouse to move the character and to point-and-click to examine or interact with characters or objects on the station. By clicking on an onscreen image of the player character, players can access 'thought mode', which provides an explanation of examined items, and 'speech mode', which provides topics the player can use to speak to other characters. There are several interactive items of machinery on the station that feature minigames, including a telescope, manipulating arm, cryogenic machine and Manned Maneuvering Unit that allows the player to go outside the station.

== Plot ==
In the year 2005, the space station Pegasus orbits the Earth with a small crew consisting of space station personnel and specialist researchers. The station's Mission Commander, Phillippe Amiot, has alerted the Ground Control that an attempt has been made on his life. In response, the player has been sent on a shuttle with an additional researcher to investigate the affair and identify the culprit of the assassination attempt. Due to international diplomatic tensions, the player assumes an alias, Dick Anderson, pretending to undertake a routine inspection, and is urged to complete their investigation with the utmost discretion within 24 hours.

== Development and release ==
Murders in Space was developed by Infogrames as the fifth and last title in the Meutres (Murders) series, created by French developer Betrand Brocard, and the sequel to the 1989 title Murders in Venice. Brocard stated that the game's design was inspired by a fascination with space, and the development team spent several days at an educational space camp held by Patrick Baudry to develop "extensive documentation" to make the game appear as realistic as possible. The game was the first in the series to be depicted in a third-person perspective. Murders in Space was released in a box containing a logbook and evidence kit with clues to complete the game, as well as a "space food" packet containing other novelty items such as a toy bug, which Brocard remarked was a "nightmare" for Infogrames to produce. In 1991, the game was repackaged with Tintin on the Moon and The Light Corridor by the publisher as a box set. The game was republished by Ziggurat Interactive in May 2020 for Windows on Steam and GOG.com.

== Reception ==
Reception

Review scores
| Publication | Score |
|---|---|
| Amiga Action | 72% |
| Amiga User International | 60% |
| ST Action | 77% |
| ST Format | 83% |

John Sweeney of New Atari User complimented the game as "enjoyable", featuring "excellent graphics" and a "good mystery", although noted the game was a "tough challenge". Andy Hutchinson of ST Format praised the game's depth, "superb" attention to detail, visuals and audio as up to the "high standard" of the publisher, stating "there's enough depth here to keep even the most avid adventurer busy for a couple of weeks". Amiga Action praised the game as "well-presented", and stated that its "whole host of smaller sub-games" added greater variety to the initial appearance of "limited" gameplay. ST Action similarly praised the game as meeting a "high graphical standard". John Scott of Strategy Plus commended the detective gameplay as "totally absorbing", but critiqued the game for having a "linear" plotline with a "limited choice of actions", and hints that are impossible to solve without outside help. Scott later reflected that the game "achieved a fiendishly difficulty level mainly by withholding essential player information", and was one of the most difficult games he had ever played. Amiga User International stated the game featured "intriguing" and "complex" puzzles, although considered the graphics and sound to be only "satisfactory".

== See also ==
- Murders in Venice, 1989 game in the Murders series
