= Laser tag =

Recreational shooting sport and game

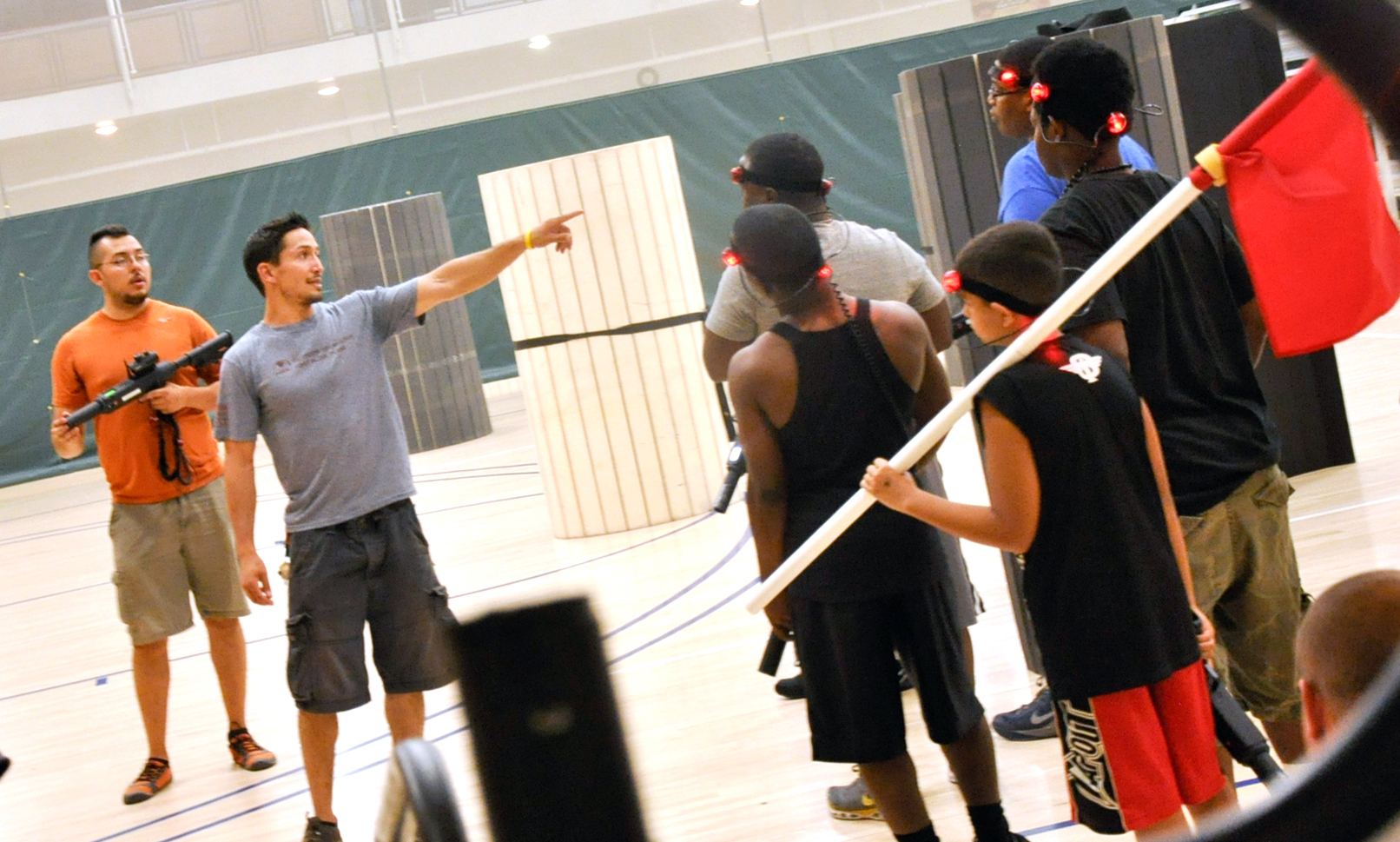
- Players being briefed before a game of laser tag
- Nicknames: Lazer tag, lasertag, laser-tag, lasergames, laser skirmish
- First played: 1984

Characteristics
- Contact: No physical contact between players is allowed; Contact can result in penalties.
- Team members: Varies depending on game format and level of play (recreational or professional)
- Type: Indoor, outdoor, mobile, toy
- Equipment: Laser guns and targets worn by players

Laser tag is a recreational shooting sport where participants use infrared-emitting light guns to tag designated targets. Infrared-sensitive signaling devices are commonly worn by each player to register hits and are sometimes integrated within the arena in which the game is played.

Laser tag is popular with a wide range of ages. Laser tag tournaments are staged for local, regional/state, inter-regional, national, bi-lateral international, and international levels.

== History ==
Since its birth in 1979, laser tag has involved both indoor and outdoor styles of play, including simulations of close quarter combat, role play-style adventure games, or competitive sporting events including tactical configurations and precise game goals.

In late 1970s and early 1980s, the United States Army deployed a system using lasers for combat training. This MILES system functioned like laser tag in that beams are "fired" into receivers that score hits.

The first known toy to use infrared light and a corresponding sensor was manufactured and marketed in 1979 as the Star Trek Electronic Phaser Guns set to accompany the release of Star Trek: The Motion Picture.

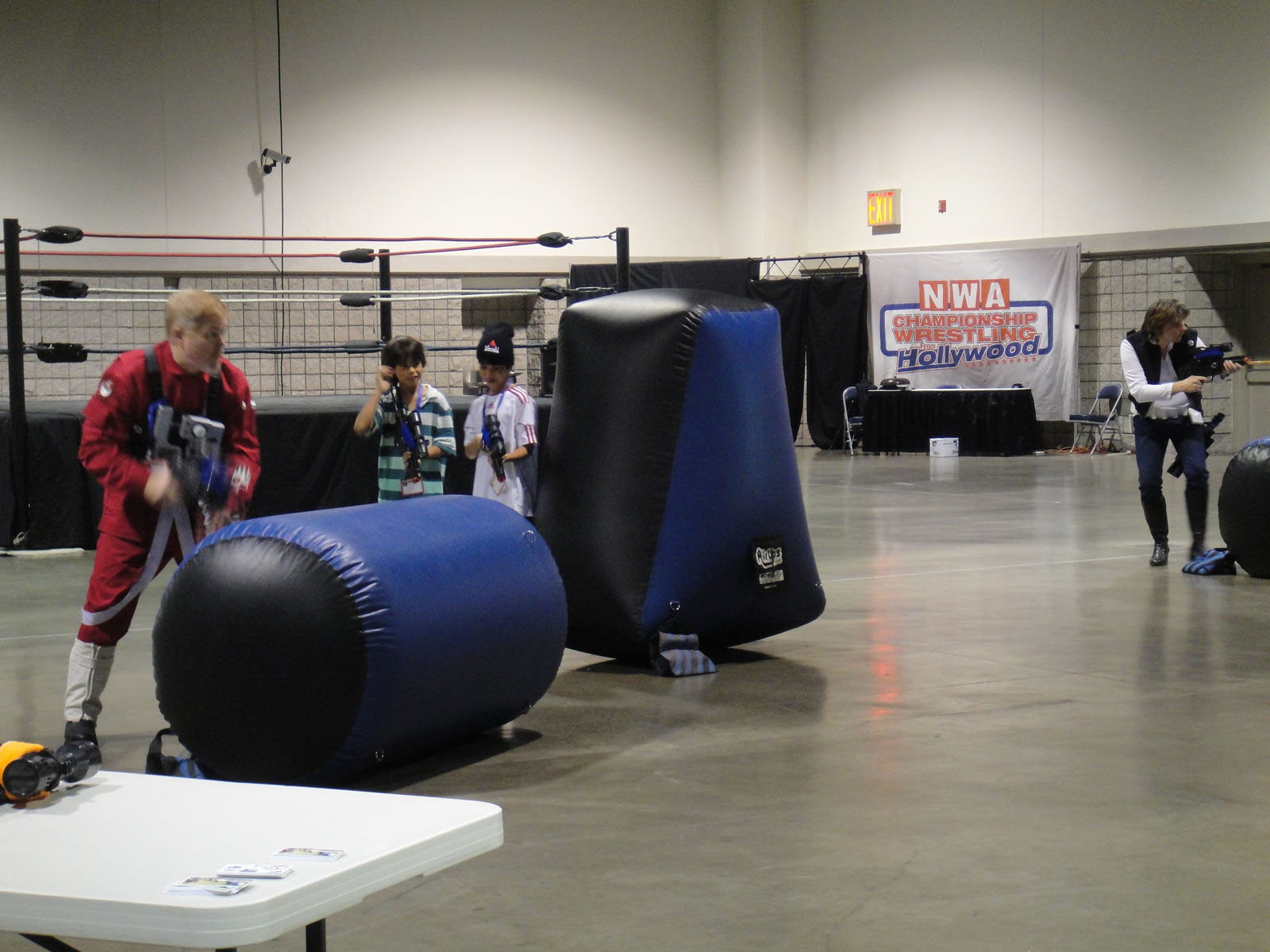
Indoor laser tag event

In 1982, George Carter III began the process of designing an arena-based system for playing a scored version of the game, a possibility which had initially occurred to him in 1977 while watching the film Star Wars. The grand opening for the first Photon center was in Dallas, Texas on 28 March 1984. Carter was honored by the International Laser Tag Association on 17 November 2005 for his contribution to the laser tag industry. The award is engraved "Presented to George A. Carter III in recognition for being the Inventor and Founder of the laser tag industry".

In 1986, the first Photon toys were sold, nearly simultaneously with the Lazer Tag toys from Worlds of Wonder and several other similar infrared and visible light-based toys. Worlds of Wonder went out of business around 1988, and Photon soon followed in 1989, as the fad of the games wore off. Today there are laser tag arenas all over the world bearing various names and brands, as well as a large variety of consumer equipment for home play and professional grade equipment for outdoor laser tag arenas and businesses.

In March 2009, upon the Winnenden school shooting, the German government announced that it would ban games such as laser tag and paintball, claiming that they trivialize and encourage violence. It later retracted this assertion.

== Equipment and technology ==
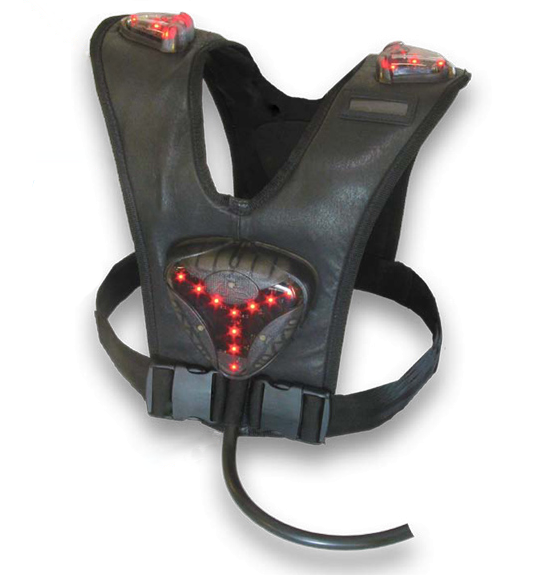
Delta Strike laser tag vest with infrared sensor and LED lights

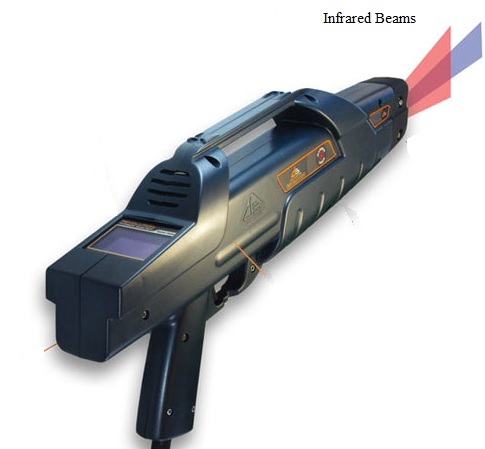
Delta Strike Laser tag pistol

Laser tag systems typically use infrared signaling to track firing of the beam. In indoor play, a visible light combined with theatrical fog typically provide the visual effect of firing, while having no actual role in transmitting the fire signal. Despite the name, laser tag equipment does not fire lasers, due to the potential dangers involved. Some laser tag may use additional equipment to simulate control points, respawn boxes, portable med kits, landmines, grenade launchers and hand grenades.

== See also ==
- Airsoft
- Gel blaster
- Nerf
- Paintball
