= Jean Baudlot =

French singer (1947–2021)

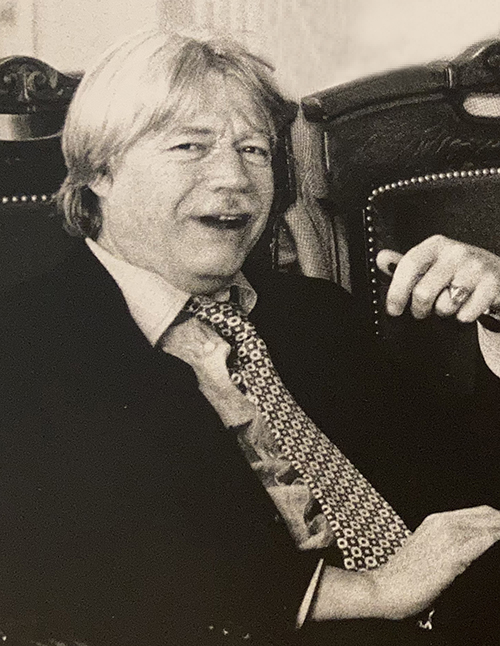
- Baudlot in 1996

Background information
- Also known as: Laurent Vaguener, Laurent Wagner
- Born: 16 February 1947; Saint-Ouen-sur-Seine, France
- Died: 24 March 2021 (aged 74)
- Genres: Instrumental, French Pop, Easy listening
- Occupations: composer, singer
- Years active: 1972 – 2021

Jean Baudlot (16 February 1947 – 24 March 2021) was a French music composer, most notable for composing music for videogames in the 1980s and 1990s and collaborations with Richard Clayderman, Nicolas de Angelis, Michèle Torr and Joe Dassin. He also represented Monaco in the Eurovision Song Contest 1979 under the pseudonym Laurent Vaguener.

== 1970–1979 ==
In his early years he composed for different labels like Polydor, AZ and Discodis when he finally stayed close to Delphine Records in 1979. He worked with Michèle Torr on J’aime and with Joe Dassin on À toi. He entered as singer (under the pseudonym Laurent Vaguener) and composer in the Eurovision Song Contest 1979 for Monaco. Together with Gérard Salesses he produced the song "Notre vie c’est la musique". He scored twelve points and took the 16th place.

Singles / Albums: Je t’hippopotaime – Gérard Croce (1972)
Trop d’amitié – Joël Prevost (1973)
Dis papa, téléphone moi – LÉNA (1974)
Aujourd’hui plus qu’hier – Jacky Reggan (1975)
Hey Lena – LÉNA (1975)
Agitez vos mouchoirs – Le Groupe France (1976)
Indiana – Irvin et Indira (1977)
J’aime – Michèle Torr et Jean-François Maurice (1977)
Help me – The Savers (1977)
Maïté – Marc Charlan (1977)
À toi – Joe Dassin (1977)
Amour disco – Irvin et Indira (1978)
Laisse danser la nana – Bob Babylone et les Salopettes (1978)
Notre vie c’est la musique (1979)
"The T Brothers" in Kingston Jamaica (1979)

== 1980–1989 ==
Through the 1980s he continued working for the Delphine Records company, most notably compositions for Richard Clayderman and Nicolas de Angelis. For the second and last time he released a single under his Laurent Vaguener pseudonym in 1984. In 1988 Delphine Records created a game developer company named Delphine Software International for which he composed numerous songs on Amiga and Atari ST. His work got mostly favorable mentioning in game magazine reviews.

Singles / Albums:
Corinna – Fire Brigade (1980)
Quelques notes pour Anna – Nicolas de Angelis (1981)
Lady Di – Richard Clayderman (1982)
Voyage – Nicolas de Angelis (1983)
Les aventuriers – Nicolas de Angelis (1983)
L’amour au grand soleil – Jean-Claude Borelly (1983)
La musique de la mer – Georges Schmitt Randall (1983)
Frenchie café – George and Priscilla Jones (1984)
Roissy 6 heures du matin – Laurent Wagner (1984)
Roland Romanelli: Le coeur au bout des doigts (1985)
Boulevard des solitudes – Norma Cohen (1987)
Toute une vie – Jean-Philippe Audin (1988)

Videogames:
Operation Wolf (1988) – Music Conversion for Amiga / Atari ST
Bad Dudes / Dragon Ninja (1988)
Future Wars Les Voyageurs du Temps: La Menace (1989)
Castle Warrior (1989)
Bio Challenge (1989)
Beach Volley (1989)

== 1990–1999 ==
He continued composing for videogames in the early 1990s most notably Operation Stealth and Flashback: The Quest for Identity. In 1995 Jean Baudlot formed his own company L’Ours-son Production which specialized in advertising and producing jingles for television and radio.

Videogames:
Operation Stealth / James Bond: The Stealth Affair (1990)
Ivanhoe (1990) with Pierre-Eric Loriaux
Cruise for a Corpse (1991)
Snow Bros. Nick & Tom (1991) *never published*
Flashback: The Quest for Identity (1992)
GT Racing 97 (1997) with Cyril Trevoan, Orou Mama

== 2000 – 2021 ==
While working for his company he produced music for (mostly French) documentaries.

TV Documentary:
Ils ont filmé la guerre en couleur / They Filmed the War in Color (2000) with Chris Elliott
La Libération (2003)
L’enfer du Pacifique (2006)
Le mystère Malraux (2007)
Hillary & Bill (2008)

Awards and achievements
Preceded by Caline & Olivier Toussaint with "Les Jardins de Monaco"	Monaco in the Eurovision Song Contest; 1979	Succeeded by Maryon with "Notre planète"
