= Ballade pour Adeline =

1977 instrumental single by Richard Clayderman, composed by Paul de Senneville

Single by Richard Clayderman

from the album Richard Clayderman
- A-side: "Ballade pour Adeline (Sonate pour Piano et Orchestre)"
- B-side: "Ballade pour Adeline (Piano seul)"
- Released: 1977
- Studio: Delphine Studios
- Label: Delphine
- Composer: Paul de Senneville
- Producer: Paul de Senneville

Richard Clayderman singles chronology
"n. a."	"Ballade pour Adeline" (1977)	"Les Fleurs Sauvages" (1978)

"Ballade pour Adeline" (French for "Ballad for Adeline") is a 1977 instrumental by Richard Clayderman, composed by Paul de Senneville. Paul de Senneville composed the piece as a tribute to his newborn daughter, Adeline. As of 2020, worldwide sales of the recording have reached 22 million copies in 38 countries. It remains Clayderman's signature hit.

The French trumpeter Jean-Claude Borelly recorded his version in the early 1980s, which used the same instrumental backing track as the original recording.

Richard Clayderman performed a duet of the track with guitarist Francis Goya in 1999, and it was released on their studio album, Together. This recording also used the same backing track.

A new version of this piece was released on the Richard Clayderman studio album A Thousand Winds in 2007, to celebrate 30 years since the original release of "Ballade Pour Adeline." Clayderman was accompanied by a new string arrangement by Olivier Toussaint.

== History ==
In 1976, Richard Clayderman (real name Philippe Pagès) received a telephone call from Olivier Toussaint, a well-known French record producer, who, with his partner, Paul de Senneville, was looking for a pianist to record a gentle piano ballad. Paul had composed this ballad as a tribute to his new born second daughter “Adeline”. The 23-year-old Philippe Pagès was auditioned along with 20 other hopefuls and, to his amazement, he got the job. "We liked him immediately", says Paul de Senneville, "His very special and soft touch on the keyboards combined with his reserved personality and good looks very much impressed Olivier Toussaint and me. We made our decision very quickly".

Philippe Pagès' name was changed to Richard Clayderman (he adopted his great-grandmother's last name to avoid mispronunciation of his real name outside France), and the single went on to sell 22 million copies in 38 countries. It was called "Ballade pour Adeline". Olivier Toussaint said: "When I signed him, I told him that if we sell 10,000 singles it will be marvellous, because it was disco at that time and we could not bet on such a ballad being a winner..... We could not imagine that it would be so big."

== Instrumentation ==
Originally composed for piano solo. The Clayderman recording features an accompaniment consisting of strings, keyboard, guitar, bass guitar, and drums. This tune has sometimes been attempted on the guitar, too.

== Structure ==
- 19 bars divided into three parts - A, B and A' (akin to extended binary)
- Part A ranges from bar 1 to 10, B from bar 11–16 and lastly A' from bar 17–19

=== Phrasal structure ===
- Introduction of two bars antecedent phrase (bar 3 to bar 6) consequent phrase (bar 7 to bar 10)
- B short (first part of bar 11) short (second part of bar 11) long (bar 12) short (first part of bar 13) short (second part of bar 13) long bar (bars 14-16)
- A' is simply a repetition of the antecedent phrase in A. It is played an octave higher.

=== Findings ===
The introduction mainly uses arpeggios to create the water imagery. The crescendo and decrescendo contribute to the contour of the piece. Lastly, the usage of semiquavers in the introduction quickens the pace of the piece, making it smooth and flow-like. The piece starts off sweetly with (I-IV-V7-I)x2. It is a simple T-PD-D-T style. Here the composer used the change in dynamics to emphasize the difference between antecedent and consequent phrase. Again, here the composer used semiquavers to add in different styles. To a certain extent the series of eight semiquavers may sound juxtaposing to the smooth/sweet mood created in the piece.

In B again, the dreamy effect is emphasized with the introduction of the semiquavers. In bar 11, it starts from F and makes its way down by step. It creates direction both in the piece as well as in the phrase. Furthermore, it seems to be anticipating a climax. In bar 12, the descending tone is "quicken" as we can see a rapid decrease E-D-C-B in the right hand. This E-D-C-B phrase seems to be a little "extra" as the melody then goes back to E and continued with its original rate of movement downwards. Finally, the direction of the piece swings upwards into a full swing. It moved 3 octaves progressively within 2 bars and moved from G to G. The melody is accompanied by alternate accent on G and D in the left hand. The difference in its dynamics from p to ff as well as bring an octave higher than in A. The range of G has also expended to include more notes and add volume to C. the E in bar 3 was omitted and in bar 17 replaced by G. this "octave in the right hand" phenomenon extends for the whole of A' here.

== Cultural references ==
- "Ballade pour Adeline" was used as the demo song for the Casio CT-650, a keyboard manufactured by Casio in 1989.
- This ballade was played as the theme piece of Filipino program on the GMA Network from 1980 to 1996 Lovingly Yours, Helen, hosted by Helen Vela.
- Kingfisher Airlines India used "Ballade pour Adeline" as its signature tune for pre-departures and post arrivals.
- The ballad is played repeatedly in the film Goodbye Berlin while the protagonists are on their road trip.
- The ballad is played during episode 21 of the German crime series The Old Fox (first broadcast November 24, 1978, on ZDF).
- One recording of this piece served as the theme music of long-running (1979–2005) Swedish Radio gardening program Trädgårdsdags.
- Vietnam Television used this song for many of its programs, and filler music when the station was off the air during the 1990s

== Charts ==
=== Weekly charts ===
Chart (1977–1981)	Peak position
Austria (Ö3 Austria Top 40)	1
Belgium (Ultratop 50 Flanders)	13
Netherlands (Dutch Top 40)	32
New Zealand (Recorded Music NZ)	36
Norway (VG-lista)	2
Sweden (Sverigetopplistan)	6
Switzerland (Schweizer Hitparade)	1
West Germany (GfK)	6

2025 weekly chart performance for "Ballade pour Adeline"
Chart (2025)	Peak position
North Macedonia Airplay (Radiomonitor)	3

=== Year-end charts ===
Chart (1977)	Position
Switzerland (Schweizer Hitparade)	10

Chart (1979)	Position
Austria (Ö3 Austria Top 40)	4
West Germany (Official German Charts)	16

== See also ==
- List of number-one singles of 1978 (Spain)
