= The Last Hero (film) =

- Film poster
- Directed by: Haruki Kadokawa
- Screenplay by: Shōichi Maruyama
- Based on: Dirty Hero by Haruhiko Oyabu
- Produced by: Haruki Kadokawa; Shinichi Hashimoto; Kosaku Wada
- Starring: Masao Kusakari; Rebecca Holden; Nana Kinomi; Atsuko Asano; Eiji Okuda
- Cinematography: Seizō Sengen
- Edited by: Kiyoaki Saitō
- Music by: Yuichiro Oda; Masato Kai
- Production companies: Haruki Kadokawa Corporation; Toei Company
- Distributed by: Toei Company
- Release date: 18 December 1982 (Japan)
- Running time: 112 minutes
- Country: Japan
- Language: Japanese
- Budget: ¥400 million
- Box office: ¥1.6 billion

The Last Hero (Japanese: 汚れた英雄, Hepburn: Yogoreta eiyū), also known as Dirty Hero, is a 1982 Japanese motorcycle racing drama film directed by Haruki Kadokawa (in his feature directorial debut). It was adapted by Shōichi Maruyama from Haruhiko Oyabu's novel Dirty Hero. The Last Hero was Kadokawa's directorial debut. The film tells the story of Akio Kitano, a motorcycle road racer who attempts to win the All Japan Road Race Championship while simultaneously wooing an American woman. It stars Masao Kusakari in the lead role, in addition to Rebecca Holden, Nana Kinomi, Atsuko Asano and Eiji Okuda. Yuichiro Oda and Masato Kai co-composed the film's score, while the songs "Riding High", "The Last Hero" and "The Lonely Rider" were performed by Rosemary Butler. The Last Hero was theatrically released by Toei Company on 18 December 1982, in Japan. Despite going overbudget, the film was a box office hit.

== Plot ==
The film opens during the 500cc Final of the 8th All Japan Road Race Championship. A fateful showdown between motorcycle racers Akio Kitano (supported by a private team) and Keishi Ooki (supported by a factory team) is about to begin on the International A-Class Sugo Circuit. Akio is currently in first place with 96 points, followed by Ooki (who is aiming for his 3rd consecutive championship) in second place, and young rider Ken Kashima in third. As the race begins, Akio takes the lead. He sets a course record on the 9th lap, but Ooki overtakes him in the final straight, defeating him by a hair. Ooki's superior vehicle, as well as the differences in their teams' technology and organization, contributed to Akio's defeat. Akio and Ooki are now tied, with their private battle going down to the final round.

Kitano's team is supported by mechanic Takashi Amemiya, former rider Muneyuki Ogata, Ogata's wife and team manager Azusa, and their son Kazumi. The team's vast financial resources come from Keiko Saitou, an international fashion designer who became Akio's patron because she is attracted to him, as well as Naoko Mikimoto, the daughter of a wealthy family. However, the team still needs more money to aim for the world stage.

Akio sets his sights on Christine Adams, the owner of an international conglomerate who happens to be visiting Japan at the time. He had previously met her in Europe, and when they reunite at a party, she easily succumbs to Akio's seduction. She agrees to give his team the funds they need. Soon, Akio finds himself falling for Christine as well.

While Akio's riding steadily improves, the crucial improvements to his motorcycle do not progress as expected, as Amemiya the mechanic continuously skips work to see a woman. As a result, Akio fires Amemiya and works on the machine himself, staying up all night. This puts a strain on Akio's relationship with Christine, though they eventually make up.

The day of the race finally arrives. Akio, Ooki and Kashima all take off at once. Ooki leads for much of the race. On the 38th and final lap, Kashima crashes spectacularly as Akio passes Ooki on the final turn, winning the race and the championship. However, after the race, Christine must go back to America. Akio and Christine kiss each other goodbye.

== Cast ==
- Masao Kusakari as Akio Kitano
- Rebecca Holden as Christine Adams
- Nana Kinomi as Keiko Saitou
- Atsuko Asano as Azusa Ogata
- Eiji Okuda as Muneyuki Ogata
- Yosuke Isozaki as Kazumi Ogata
- Hiroshi Katsuno as Keishi Ooki
- Satoshi Sadanaga as Ken Kashima
- Yutaka Hayashi as Takashi Amemiya
- Mayumi Asaka as Naoko Mikimoto
- Tony Cetera as Patton
- Kōjirō Kusanagi as Tetsuya Kamedani
- Leo Meneghetti as Morales
- Hirohisa Nakata as Hatada
- Akihiro Shimizu as Shimazaki
- Masatō Ibu as Teddy Kataoka
- Tarō Mochizuki as Shimizu
- Kazunaga Tsuji as Oohashi
- Yutaka Nakajima as Kazuko Kawai

== Background ==
Oyabu's story was originally serialized in Weekly Asahi Geinō from 1966 to 1969. Upon completion, it was published as a single volume, by Tokuma Shoten. It was later republished in 1979, by Kadokawa Shoten, which was owned by director Haruki Kadokawa at the time.

The original novel was inspired by the exploits of real-life motorsport racers Tetsu Ikuzawa, Kenjiro Tanaka, Kunimitsu Takahashi, Mike Hailwood and Jim Redman (in addition, a side character was inspired by Italian businessman Domenico Agusta).

== Production ==
By the late 1970s, Kadokawa Shoten owned film adaptation rights to the novel, while Tokuma Shoten owned the publishing rights. A deal was struck between the companies; Kadokawa would receive publishing rights, while Tokuma optioned the adaptation rights for three years. Tokuma Shoten's owner at the time, Yasuyoshi Tokuma, asked producer Yoshinobu Nishizaki to kickstart production. Tokuma and Nishizaki's companies would split the production cost. They planned to hire Sadao Nakajima and Toshio Masuda to direct the adaptation. Nishizaki wrote a script set in Japan, the United States and Europe, and ¥300 million was invested into pre-production. 20 motorcycles were prepared, and over 10 hours of location shooting took place in Europe. However, by the early 1980s, Tokuma Shoten's cash flow had deteriorated due to the failure of several subsidiaries. As a result, the production was put on hold indefinitely. In October 1981, the adaptation rights lapsed back to Kadokawa.

After the Kadokawa-produced film Sailor Suit and Machine Gun was a box office hit in December 1981, Toei Company president Shigeru Okada asked Kadokawa to produce another film for the 1982 holiday season. It was decided that this would be The Last Hero.

Kadokawa did not originally plan to direct The Last Hero. Seijun Suzuki, Kichitaro Negishi and Tōru Murakawa were approached to direct, but they all turned down the offer. Eventually, Kadokawa decided to make the film himself.

The original novel is set in the 1950s. This was changed to a contemporary setting for the film. Screenwriter Maruyama stated that the film's runtime was a limitation in the adaptation process. He ultimately chose to depict Akio's character arc accurately, rather than stay true to the plot itself. Kadokawa believed that the motorcycle races would be the main attraction, not the character of Akio, but nonetheless consulted with Maruyama when making changes to the script. He attempted to convey the "power" of his images by cutting as much dialogue as possible. Kadokawa compared this process to writing a haiku. He also believed that conveying the story through visuals would make the film more accessible to audiences outside Japan.

Filming lasted for 70 days, from August to early October 1982. The film's opening sequence was shot at Sportsland Sugo, while the climactic race was shot at the Suzuka Circuit. Hideo Kanaya served as the production's racing supervisor.

Kadokawa storyboarded the film, but his vision for the project changed over time. When he arrived on set for the first time, he had the crew throw out his original storyboards and redo them. Kadokawa was described as a "demon" on set; cinematographer Seizō Sengen told Kadokawa that he had never been so angry at a director before. In the middle of production, Kadokawa, who did not have a motorcycle license, wanted to get a feel for the circuit. While riding between takes, he suffered an accident, breaking two ribs and injuring his face. The injuries to his face required 24 stitches. Due to Kadokawa's accident and the revised storyboards, the production went overbudget by ¥50 million.

The sequence with three motorcyclists racing side by side was shot by strapping cinematographer Sengen and his camera to the hood of a Porsche and driving next to the racers. At one point, Sadao Asami, a professional racer involved in the sequence, could not see ahead of himself. Despite the track containing a hairpin turn, he managed to complete the course by following the movements of the other racers.

Kadokawa intended the film's climactic race to evoke the final boxing match in Rocky, down to the race's runtime being nearly equivalent to that of the Rocky match.

Lead actor Kusakari later recalled that Kadokawa didn't allow him much freedom in exploring his character, as the director intended Akio to exhibit emptiness. Young racer Tadahiko Taira was Kusakari's stuntman (though a wheelie towards the end of the film was performed by Keiji Kinoshita).

== Soundtrack ==
The film's rock soundtrack was co-composed by Yuichiro Oda and Masato Kai. It consists of 13 tracks. Its opening theme song "Riding High", as well as the insert songs "The Last Hero" and "The Lonely Rider", were all performed by Rosemary Butler. In addition, two compositions by Olivier Toussaint and Paul de Senneville were included on the soundtrack: "Nostalgy" and "Quelques Notes Pour Anna".

The tracks were recorded at four separate studios: Nikkatsu Studios, Cherokee Studios, Redwing Studios and Sunset Sound Recorders. Tracks 2 through 5, 11 and 13 were arranged by Kai. Director Kadokawa and Peter Bernstein produced the recordings. The guitars were performed by session musicians Josh Leo and Mark Goldenberg, and Harry Stinson played the drums. Bernstein also performed bass guitar and arranged tracks 1, 6 and 12 (all three of Butler's tracks). The soundtrack was released by Eastworld in 1982, on vinyl and cassette formats.

All music is composed by Yuichiro Oda and Masato Kai unless otherwise noted:

No.	Title	Writer(s)	Vocals	Length
1.	"Riding High"		Rosemary Butler	4:34
2.	"Through the Haze"			3:57
3.	"Endless Game"			3:31
4.	"The Last Hero (instrumental)"			3:47
5.	"Riding High (instrumental)"			3:25
6.	"The Last Hero"		Butler	4:00
7.	"Misty Eyes"			3:51
8.	"Nostalgy"	Olivier Toussaint, Paul de Senneville		2:29
9.	"Quelques Notes Pour Anna"	Toussaint, de Senneville		3:33
10.	"Misty Eyes"			3:51
11.	"Stop Motion"			2:59
12.	"The Lonely Rider"		Butler	3:47
13.	"So Long... Forever"			5:18
Total length:				49:02

== Release ==
The Last Hero was theatrically released by Toei Company on 18 December 1982, in Japan. Kadokawa employed a business strategy of selling VHS copies of the film in theater lobbies, simultaneous with its theatrical release. However, his strategy did not upset the theater companies, as few people owned VCRs at the time, and early VHS prices were significantly higher than ticket prices.

Author Akihiko Ito wrote that Kadokawa intended to kill himself if The Last Hero did not gross at least ¥1.2 billion. It was ultimately a hit, grossing ¥1.6 billion at the box office.

The film was later released to DVD on 24 September 2004, by Kadokawa Entertainment. It was first released to Blu-ray on 28 September 2012, and later released on 4K Blu-ray on 13 October 2023.

== Reception ==
A review in The Asahi Shimbun stated that "Director Kadokawa's achievement of filming a cool man with as few lines as possible... is out. However, whether it is because of Kusakari's acting or because of the lack of directing, unfortunately the inner world of the characters cannot be seen." It also deemed the production to be "movie as fashion" for young people.

== Awards and nominations ==
7th Japan Academy Awards

- Won: Outstanding Performance by an Actress in a Supporting Role (Atsuko Asano, also won for The Geisha)
- Won: Popularity Award
