= Luis Rigou =

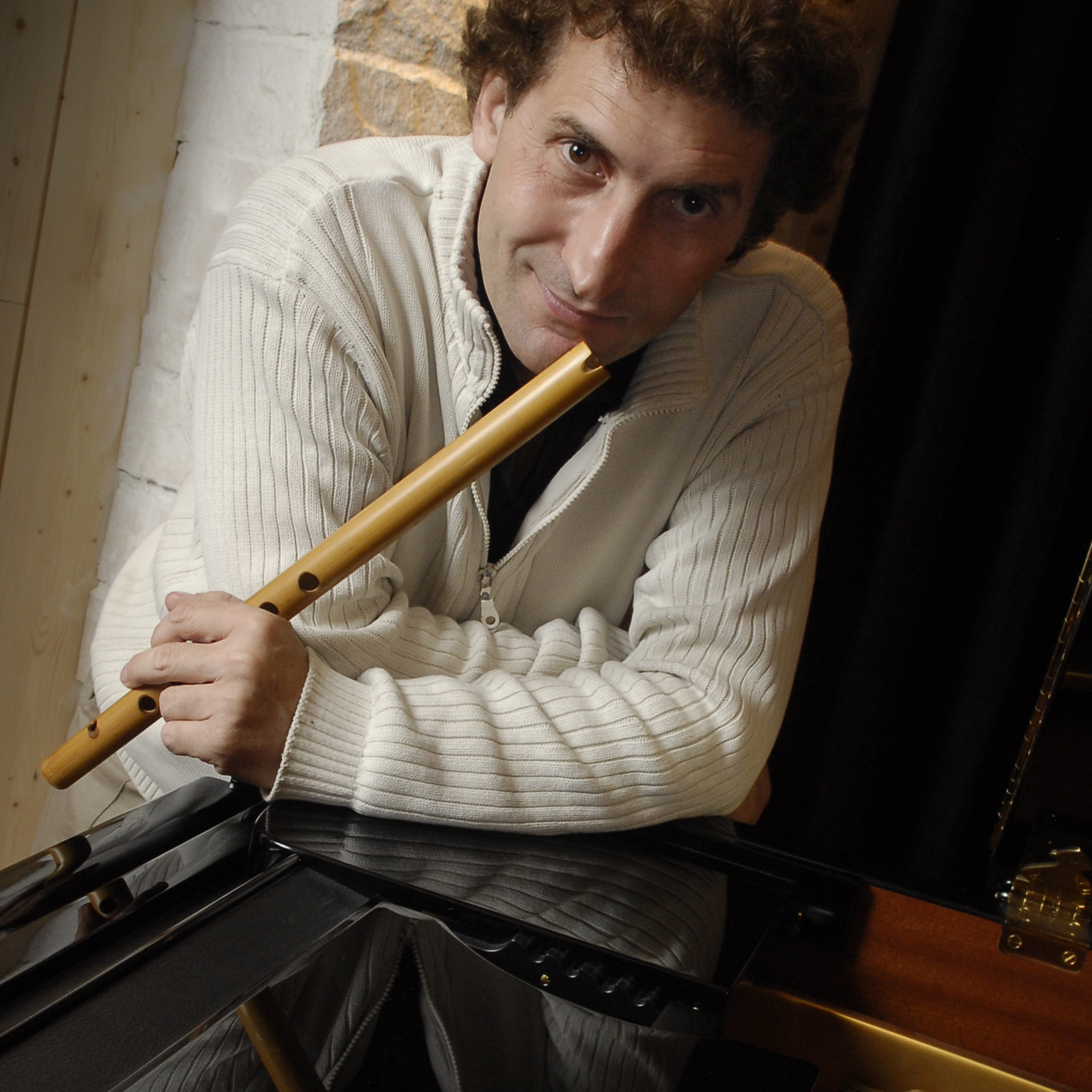
- Luis Rigou at his studio.

Background information
- Also known as: Diego Modena
- Born: June 23, 1961 (age 65); Buenos Aires, Argentina
- Genres: Folklore, classic, tango music
- Occupations: Flautist; Singer; Composer; Artistic direction
- Instruments: Quena; Ocarina; Flute
- Years active: 1982 –present
- Label: Polydor Records
- Website: www.luisrigou.com

Luis Rigou (born 23 June 1961), also known as Diego Modena, is an Argentinian flautist, singer, composer and artistic director based in Paris, France. He is the founding member of South American musical ensemble, Maíz. Rigou is best known for his album Ocarina which sold over 14 million records worldwide and reached top 10 on the national record charts of 44 countries.

== Early life and education ==
Rigou was born in 1961, in Buenos Aires, Argentina. He attended Colegio San Agustín in Buenos Aires and graduated from the high school. He later attended University of Buenos Aires where he studied law. Rigou received his musical training at Conservatorio Nacional Superior de Música where he mastered transverse flute and quena.

== Career ==
Rigou began his professional music career in the early 1980s. At the age of 20, he collaborated with the Argentinian musician, Jaime Torres as the soloist and toured with him globally for three and a half year. In 1982, Rigou founded the musical group, Maíz. The group toured and performed all over the world and released two full-length albums by 1989. In 1987, Maíz performed at the Cosquín Festival where they were awarded with the Premio Revelación by Atahualpa Yupanqui. Rigou toured extensively with Maíz to the United States, Sweden, Czechoslovakia, Italy and Uruguay.

In 1989, Rigou moved to Basel, Switzerland in order to master his flute playing skills. He spent one year in Switzerland where he received lessons from Peter-Lukas Graf and Felix Renggli. In the late 1990, he moved to Paris and joined Cuarteto Cedrón as a flautist. Cuarteto Cedrón were an Argentinian musical group based in Paris. With Cuarteto Cedrón, Rigou was introduced to the genre of tango music.

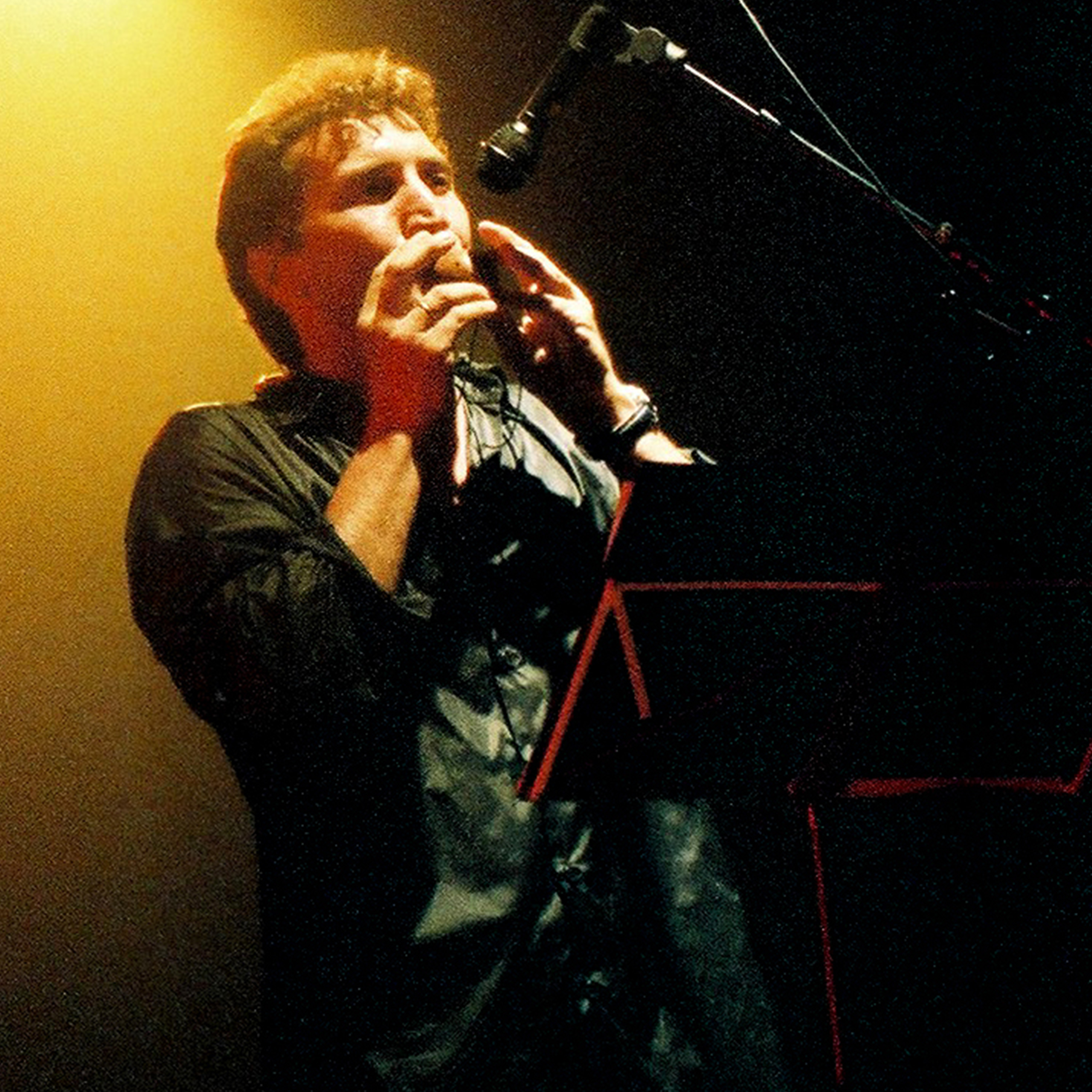
Luis Rigou performing Ocarina in a concert (2008).

In 1991, Rigou collaborated with Jean-Philippe Audin, Paul de Senneville, Michel Polnareff and Richard Clayderman for the album Ocarina. The album was released by Polydor Records in September 1991. Rigou used his stage name, Diego Modena, for the album. Ocarina album series was very successful throughout Europe. Over the period of eight years from 1992 to 2000, Ocarina was awarded with 57 gold records, 1 platinum record, 2 double-platinum and a diamond record. The album sold more than 14 million copies around the globe. Ocarina reached top 10 on the national record charts of 44 countries and peaked at the no.1 spot in 14 countries.

In 1996, Rigou collaborated with Renaud Garcia-Fons and Vicente Pradal, as a flautist and co-arranger for the project Cantique Spirituel de Saint Jean de la Croix. In 1998, Rigou wrote the opera Les Archanges with the pianist Gerardo Di Giusto who composed the music. Les Archanges has been translated into Spanish and performed at various theaters in Argentina and France. In 1998, Rigou collaborated with the French musician, Eve Griliquez and released the album, Le Chant des Hommes. The album received Coup de cœur award from the Académie Charles Cros. Le Chant des Hommes was composed in homage to the Turkish poet and playwright Nazim Hikmet.

In 1999, Rigou associated with Companyia Elèctrica Dharma as an artistic director for their project Raco de Mon. In the year 2002, he created the musical show Brève Invitée with Maurice Petit and Andrée Chedid.

Rigou and the French music ensemble La Chimera produced and performed the composition Misa Criolla by Ariel Ramírez in the year 2014. The show was directed by Eduardo Egüez. Misa Criolla was premiered at the Oratoire du Louvre on 27 March 2014 and France Musique aired the show. Rigou and La Chimera association continued in the year 2017 with the production of the project Gracias a la Vida, a composition dedicated to South American music.

In 2018, Rigou and the French-American pianist Céline Bishop released the album Tango Secret. The album has been adapted on the stage as an opera as well as a mime performance. The mime artists, Los Guardiola adapted and performed Tango Secret at the Café de la Danse in the year 2020.

== Recognitions ==
- 1997 : Special award by Fondation de France with Hélène Arntzen at the Biarritz Film Festival for the short film by the Médecins du Monde.
- 2007 : Ambassador of Peace for the town Lourdes, France.
- 2011 : Honorary Citizen of Culture by the city of Bahia Blanca.
- 2011 : Illustrious Visitor of the Arts by the city of Granadero Baigorria.
- 2013 : Illustrious Personality of Culture by the city of Buenos Aires.

== Discography ==
=== Maíz ===
- 1988 : Artigas, with Aníbal Sampayo, China Zorrilla and the Palau de la Música Catalana's choir
- 1989 : Viajero por la tierra

=== Cuarteto Cedrón ===
- 1990 : Tango Primeur (transverse flute)

=== Diego Modena ===
- 1991 : Ocarina
- 1993 : Ocarina II
- 1995 : Songs for baby Jane
- 1997 : Best of Ocarina
- 1997 : Alma América
- 1999 : Amalia

=== Luis Rigou ===
- 1996 : Flûtes des Andes
- 2003 : Corazón al Sur
- 2019 : Tango Secret, Luis Rigou & Céline Bishop
- 2020 : Quebrada, Luis Rigou, Laurent Compignie & Diego Pittaluga
- 2021 : Caminos de los Andes vol. 1 et vol.2

=== As an artistic director ===
- 1998 : Racò da Mòn, Companyia Elèctrica Dharma
- 1999 : Rodará el mundo, Marina Rossell
- 2000 : Temps de révoltes, Lluís Llach
- 2001 : Crier jusqu’à la fin du monde, Benjamin Fondane
- 2002 : Les chants des hommes, Eve Griliquez

=== As a flautist and singer ===
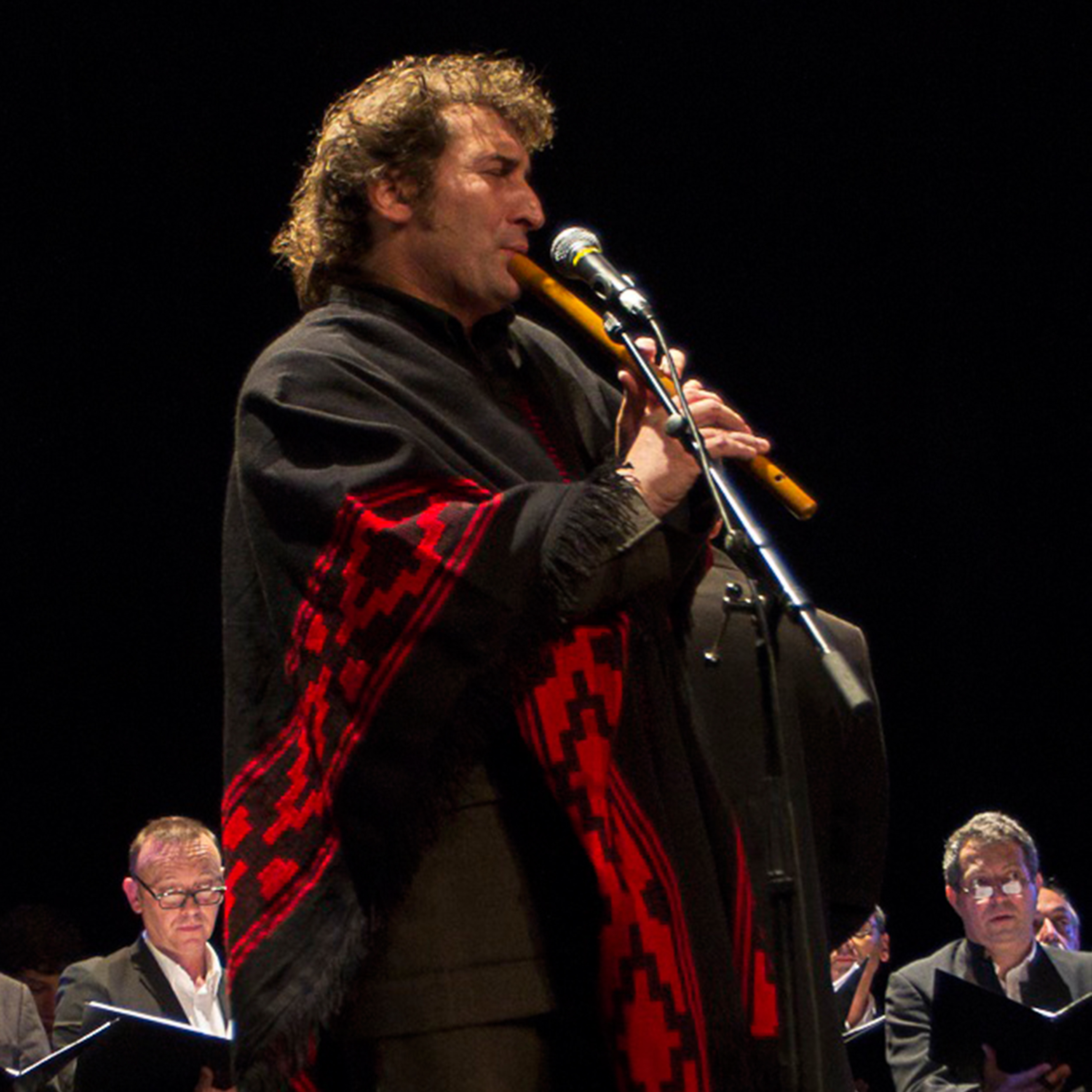
Luis Rigou playing quena at the La Chimera concert in 2015.

- 1993 : Nilda Fernández, Nilda Fernández
- 1994 : Compiègne, Nilda Fernández
- 1995 : Un pont de mar blava, Lluís Llach
- 2006 : Tonos & Tonadas, La Chimera & Eduardo Egüez
- 2008 : Llanto por Ignacio Sánchez Mejías, Vicente Pradal
- 2015 : Misa de Indios, La Chimera & Eduardo Egüez
- 2016 : Medianoche, Vicente Pradal
- 2017 : Gracias a la Vida, La Chimera & Eduardo Egüez

=== Music for films ===
- 1991 : Karim et Sala by Idrissa Ouedraogo.
- 1992 : Voleur d'enfants for Christian de Challonge (music by Lluís Llach).
- 1996 : Rivière Espérance by Yves Boisset.
- 1997 : Médecins du Monde by Daniel Berthay (composed by Eduardo Makaroff and Helene Arntzen), received special prize at the Biarritz Film Festival (Fondation de France).
- 2004 : Caminos de los Andes
