= Louis Thauron =

French ice dancer

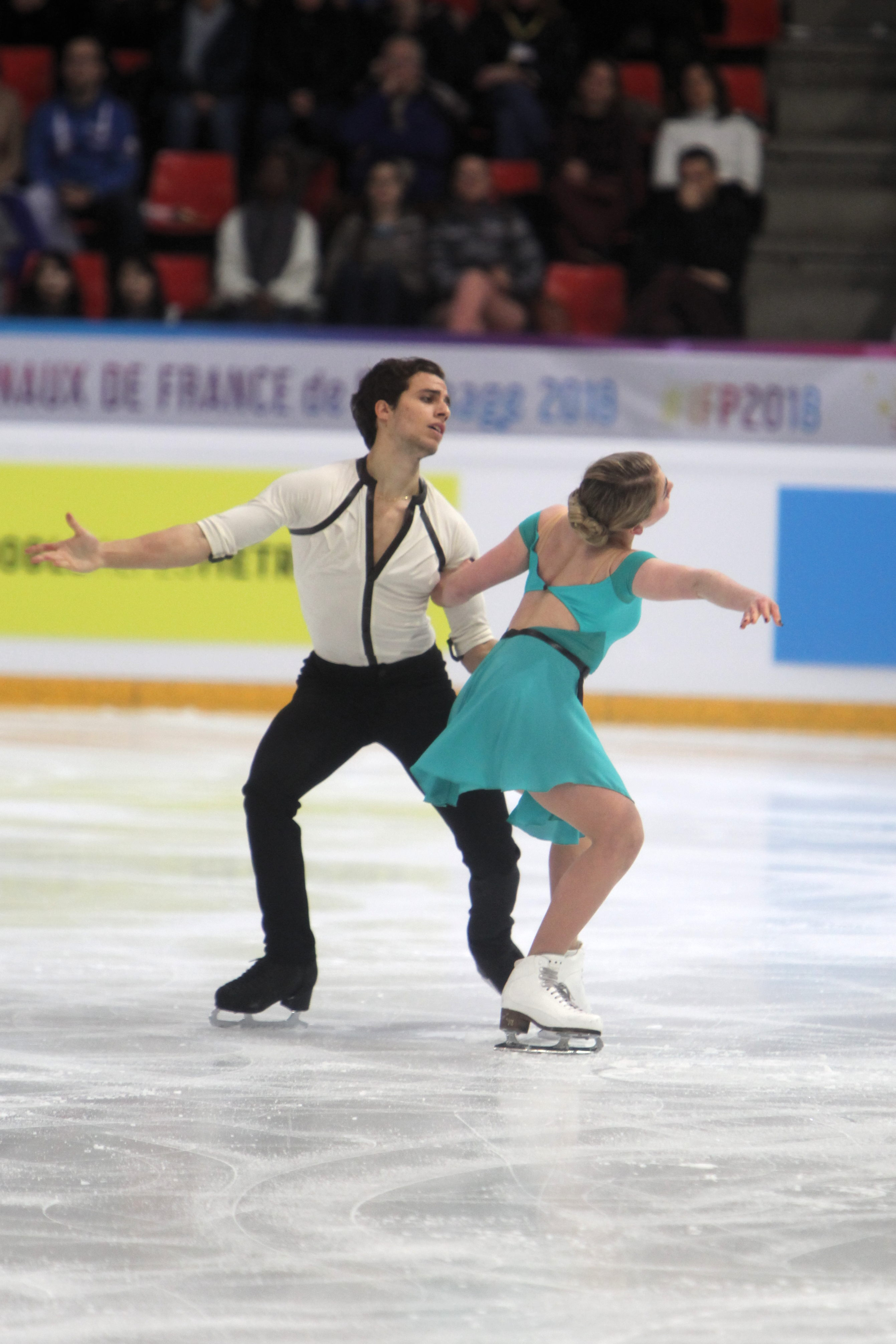
- Galyavieva/Thauron at the 2018 Internationaux de France

Personal information
- Born: 5 August 1995 (age 31) Paris, France
- Height: 1.75 m (5 ft 9 in)

Figure skating career
- Country: France
- Coach: Anjelika Krylova, Oleg Volkov
- Skating club: Français Volants
- Began skating: 2000
Medal record
Representing France
Winter Universiade
Bronze medal – third place	2019 Krasnoyarsk	Ice dancing

Louis Thauron (born 5 August 1995) is a French ice dancer. With his former partner Adelina Galyavieva, he is the 2021 French National Champion. With Angélique Abachkina, he represented France at four World Junior Championships, finishing within the top ten at three editions (2015–2017).

== Personal life ==
Louis Thauron was born on 5 August 1995 in Paris. As of 2016, he is studying engineering at INSA Lyon school. In 2019, Louis decided to enter in EM Lyon for a Master.

== Career ==
=== Early years ===
Thauron began skating in 2000. He competed internationally on the novice level with Lindsay Pousset during the 2010–11 season. The following season, they received assignments to two ISU Junior Grand Prix events, in Austria and Italy. They were coached by Christophe Lecomte and Benjamin Delmas in Viry-Châtillon.

=== Partnership with Abachkina ===
Thauron teamed up with Angélique Abachkina in 2012. The duo debuted on the ISU Junior Grand Prix series in 2013, placing eighth in Estonia and tenth in Poland. In 2014, they were named in the French team for the World Junior Championships in Sofia, Bulgaria. Abachkina/Thauron placed 19th in the short dance, 15th in the free dance, and 18th overall. They were coached by Muriel Zazoui, Romain Haguenauer, Olivier Schoenfelder, and Diana Ribas in Lyon, France, during the 2013–14 season.

Abachkina/Thauron changed coaches prior to the 2014–15 season, joining Igor Shpilband and Fabian Bourzat in Novi, Michigan. They placed seventh at both of their 2014 JGP events. Ranked eighth in the short dance and seventh in the free, they finished eighth overall at the 2015 World Junior Championships in Tallinn, Estonia.

Competing in the 2015 JGP series, Abachkina/Thauron won the silver medal in Riga, Latvia, and placed fourth in Zagreb, Croatia. They finished 7th at the 2016 World Junior Championships in Debrecen, Hungary. In the 2016 JGP series, Abachkina/Thauron were awarded gold in Saint-Gervais-les-Bains, France, and bronze in Yokohama, Japan.

=== Partnership with Galyavieva ===
Louis Thauron teamed up with French ice dancer Adelina Galyavieva after a tryout in Lyon on 14 February 2018.[2][5] The two decided to represent France but train in Moscow, coached by Russia's Anjelika Krylova and Oleg Volkov.[2] Making their debut, they placed 8th at the 2018 CS Ondrej Nepela Trophy in September.

As France's host pick, Galyavieva/Thauron competed at the 2018 Internationaux de France, placing 10th overall at the November Grand Prix event.[6][7] In December, they won their first international medal, bronze at Turkey's Bosphorus Cup, and then took bronze at the French Championships. They were subsequently named to France's team for the 2019 European Championships. Season 2018/2019 ends with a bronze medal at 29th Winter Universiade 2019 in Krasnoyarsk, with a total score 177,23 pts.

== Programs ==
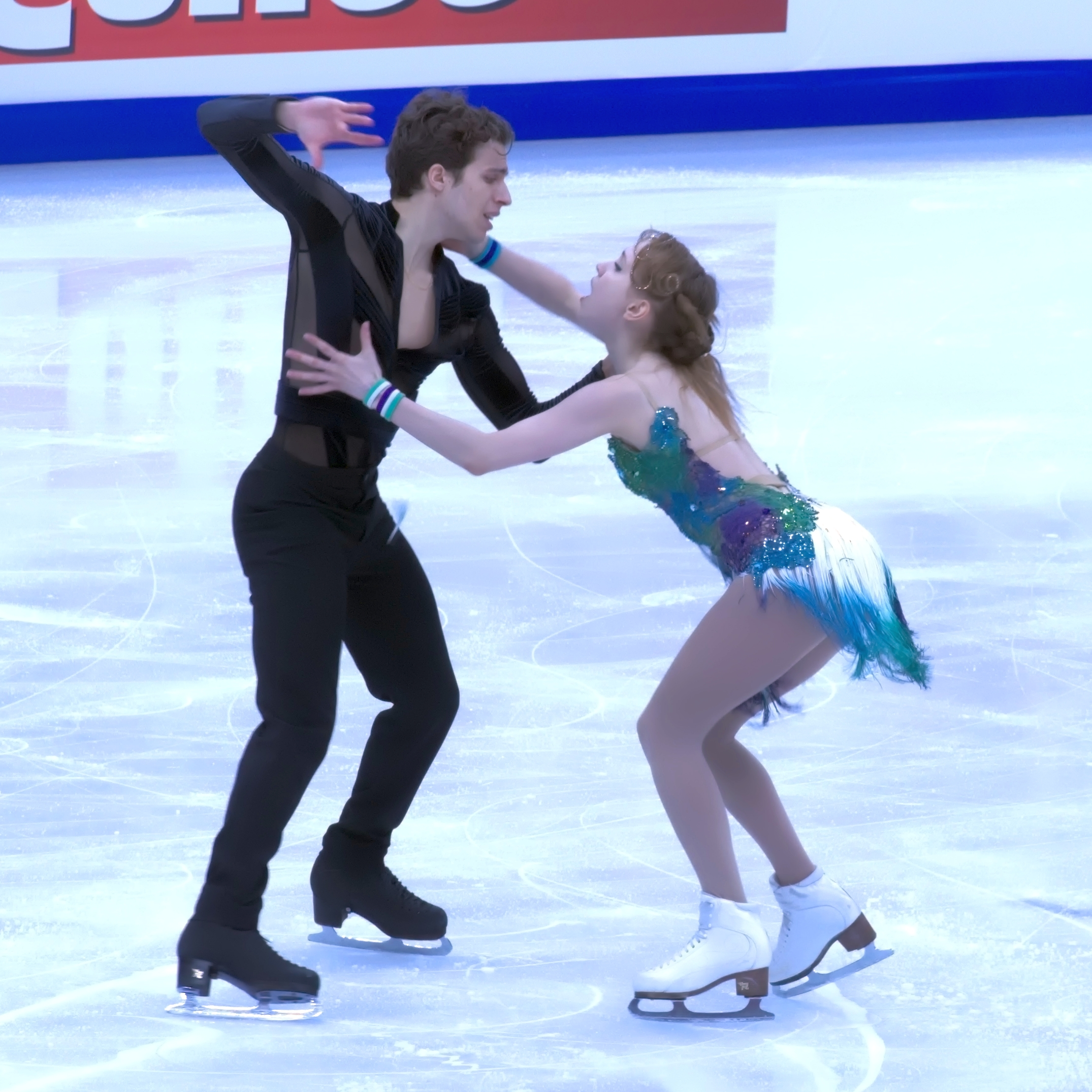
Abachkina/Thauron at the 2018 European Figure Skating Championships in Moscow

(with Galyavieva)

Season	Rhythm dance	Free dance	Exhibition
2020–2021		Perfume: The Story of a Murderer by Tom Tykwer, Johnny Klimek	
2019–2020	Mamma Mia!: Swing: Dancing Queen; Slow Fox: I Have a Dream; Swing: Dancing Queen	Carmen by Georges Bizet	
2018–2019	Flamenco: Flamenco performed by Antonio Gades, Cristina Hoyos; Tango: Tango Flamenco performed by Armik	Amélie by Yann Tiersen	Stay by Gorod 312

(with Abachkina)

Season	Short dance	Free dance	Exhibition
2017–2018	Samba: Le serpent by Guem; Rhumba: Abrazame performed by Tamara; Rhumba: Danca Kizomba by Stony	Mariage d'amour by Paul de Senneville; Je suis malade performed by Lara Fabian	Anabasis by Dead Can Dance; Do You Love Me? by the Bendaly Family remixed by TroyBoi
2016–2017	Blues: You Can Leave Your Hat On by Joe Cocker; Swing: Swing Baby by Park Jin-young	Shadritsa (Russian gypsy music)	
2015–2016	Don Quixote; Quiteria and Basilio by Ludwig Minkus choreo. by Igor Shpilband	Spartacus by Aram Khachaturian choreo. by Igor Shpilband	
2014–2015	Samba: Dans ta chambre by Dany Brillant; Rhumba: Quand je vois tes yeux; Samba	Nimbooda Nimbooda; Silsila ye chohat ka; Dhoom Toana	
2013–2014	Chicago by John Kander, Fred Ebb; Overture; All That Jazz; Hot Honey Rag	Rio; Real in Rio Sérgio Mendes, Carlinhos Brown, Siedah Garrett; Mas que nada by Jorge Ben; Bird Fight by John Powell	
2012–2013	Blues: Unknown	Romanza by Salvador Bacarisse; Fiesta Flamenca by Monty Kelly	

== Competitive highlights ==
GP: Grand Prix; CS: Challenger Series; JGP: Junior Grand Prix

=== With Galyavieva ===
International
Event	18–19	19–20	20–21	21–22
Worlds			16th	
Europeans	12th	12th		
GP France	10th		C	WD
GP Rostelecom		8th		WD
CS Cup of Austria				WD
CS Lombardia		9th		
CS Ondrej Nepela	8th			
Bosphorus Cup	3rd			
Denis Ten Memorial		2nd		
Egna Trophy		3rd		
Mezzaluna Cup		2nd		
Universiade	3rd			
Volvo Open Cup	4th			
National
French Champ.	3rd	2nd	1st	
Masters	2nd	3rd	WD	
Team events
World Team Trophy			5th T 4th P	
TBD = Assigned; WD = Withdrew; C = Event cancelled T = Team Result; P = Personal result. Medals awarded for team result only

=== With Abachkina ===
International
Event	12–13	13–14	14–15	15–16	16–17	17–18
European Champ.						16th
GP Cup of China						8th
GP France						6th
CS Ondrej Nepela						5th
Cup of Nice						4th
International: Junior
Junior Worlds		18th	8th	7th	8th	
JGP Final					5th	
JGP Croatia			7th	4th		
JGP Estonia		8th				
JGP France					1st	
JGP Japan					3rd	
JGP Latvia				2nd		
JGP Poland		10th				
JGP Slovenia			7th			
Santa Claus Cup		1st J				
National
French Champ.	9th J	2nd J	1st J	2nd J		3rd
Masters		2nd J	1st J		1st J	3rd
J = Junior level TBD = Assigned; WD = Withdrew

=== With Pousset ===
International
Event	2010–11	2011–12
JGP Austria		10th
JGP Italy		11th
NRW Trophy	1st N	8th J
Trophy of Lyon	1st N	7th J
Levels: N = Advanced novice; J = Junior
