= List of number-one singles of 1978 (Spain) =

This is a list of the Spanish Singles number-ones of 1978.

== Chart history ==
Issue date	Song	Artist
2 January	"Credo"	Elsa Baeza
9 January	"Credo"	Elsa Baeza
16 January	"Credo"	Elsa Baeza
23 January	"Credo"	Elsa Baeza
30 January	"Credo"	Elsa Baeza
6 February	"Credo"	Elsa Baeza
13 February	"Credo"	Elsa Baeza
20 February	"Unlimited Citations"	Café Crème
27 February	"Te amo"	Umberto Tozzi
6 March	"Te amo"	Umberto Tozzi
13 March	"Te amo"	Umberto Tozzi
20 March	"Te amo"	Umberto Tozzi
27 March	"Te amo"	Umberto Tozzi
3 April	"Te amo"	Umberto Tozzi
10 April	"Te amo"	Umberto Tozzi
17 April	"Ballade pour Adeline"	Richard Clayderman
24 April	"Ballade pour Adeline"	Richard Clayderman
1 May	"Poco a poco... me enamoré de ti"	I Collage
8 May	"Stayin' Alive"	Bee Gees
15 May	"Te Amo"	Umberto Tozzi
22 May	"Stayin' Alive"	Bee Gees
29 May	"Stayin' Alive"	Bee Gees
5 June	"Stayin' Alive"	Bee Gees
12 June	"Stayin' Alive"	Bee Gees
19 June	"Night Fever"	Bee Gees
26 June	"Night Fever"	Bee Gees
3 July	"Cara de gitana"	Daniel Magal
10 July	"Cara de gitana"	Daniel Magal
17 July	"Sólo tú"	Matia Bazar
24 July	"Cara de gitana"	Daniel Magal
31 July	"Anna"	Miguel Bosé
7 August	"Anna"	Miguel Bosé
14 August	"It's a Heartache"	Bonnie Tyler
21 August	"It's a Heartache"	Bonnie Tyler
28 August	"Rivers of Babylon"	Boney M
4 September	"Rivers of Babylon"	Boney M
11 September	"Rivers of Babylon"	Boney M
18 September	"Rivers of Babylon"	Boney M
25 September	"Rivers of Babylon"	Boney M
2 October	"Lay Love on You"	Luisa Fernández
9 October	"You're the One That I Want"	John Travolta & Olivia Newton-John
16 October	"You're the One That I Want"	John Travolta & Olivia Newton-John
23 October	"You're the One That I Want"	John Travolta & Olivia Newton-John
30 October	"You're the One That I Want"	John Travolta & Olivia Newton-John
6 November	"You're the One That I Want"	John Travolta & Olivia Newton-John
13 November	"You're the One That I Want"	John Travolta & Olivia Newton-John
20 November	"You're the One That I Want"	John Travolta & Olivia Newton-John
27 November	"You're the One That I Want"	John Travolta & Olivia Newton-John
4 December	"Tú"	Umberto Tozzi
11 December	"Tú"	Umberto Tozzi
18 December	"Tú"	Umberto Tozzi
25 December	"Tú"	Umberto Tozzi

== See also ==
- 1978 in music
- List of number-one hits (Spain)
