= Anarchic System =

French band (1972–1978)

- Origin: Lille, France
- Genres: Pop rock; electronic; progressive rock
- Years active: 1972-1978
- Label: AZ/Delphine
- Past members: Gilles Devos; Jacques Deville; Patrick Verette; Christian Lerouge; Michel Dhuy

Anarchic System was a French pop group formed in the early 1970s.

The band's members were parts of other groups from the rock scene of northern France. They were in good friendship when the opportunity of recording the "Popcorn" cover was given to them by Paul de Senneville (of Delphine Records) in 1972. They were chosen because of Christian Lerouge's incredible ability in using a Minimoog. Commercial success (700,000 copies) gave the band an opportunity to release two other singles ("Carmen Brasilia" and "Royal Summer"), even before they were signed in 1973.

The band's songs are mostly attributed to electronic music due to the presence of a keyboard in "Popcorn", "Carmen Brasilia" and the long version of "Generation". However, other singles are influenced by rock genres. Their influence were Uriah Heep, Warhorse, Black Sabbath and such.

Their songs were written by Paul de Senneville and Olivier Toussaint for the first singles (including "Generation"), then they changed to C. Gordanne, C. Van Loo and I. Wira for the following releases, only achieving to impose their own songs on the release "Goody Lady" in 1977.

== Musicians ==
- Gilles Devos: vocals;
- Jacques Deville: vocals and guitar;
- Patrick Verette: bass;
- Christian Lerouge: keyboards, Minimoog;
- Michel Dhuy: drums.

The musicians were involved in other line up :

- Gilles Devos: vocals in Try Again;
- Jacques Deville: guitar in Les Lynx.

== Discography ==
=== Albums ===
- Pussycat c'est la vie (1974)
- Generation (1975)
- Sugar Baby Mission Space Recording (1976)

=== Compilations and appearances ===
- Anarchic System
- Dolannès Melodies (1975): movies soundtracks, songs played by Jean-Claude Borelly, Anarchic System (the song "Starlight" instrumental) and Pop Concerto Orchestra
- Jean-Claude Borelly (1978): featuring with the song "Wish to Know Why"

=== Singles ===
- "Popcorn" cover (1972)
- "Carmen Brasilia" (1972)
- "Royal Summer" (1973)
- "Cherie Sha La La" (1973)
- "Pussycat c'est la vie" (1974)
- "Love, Oh My Love Amour" (1974)
- "Nana Guili Guili Gouzy Gouzy" (1975)
- "Generation" (1975)
- "Stop It" (1976)
- "Daddy, Mammy, Juddy, Jimmy, Jully and All the Family" (1976)
- "Goody Lady" (1977)

Released by AZ Records but without intervention of the former members:

- "Movie Star" (1983)
