= Paul de Senneville =

French composer and music producer (1933–2023)

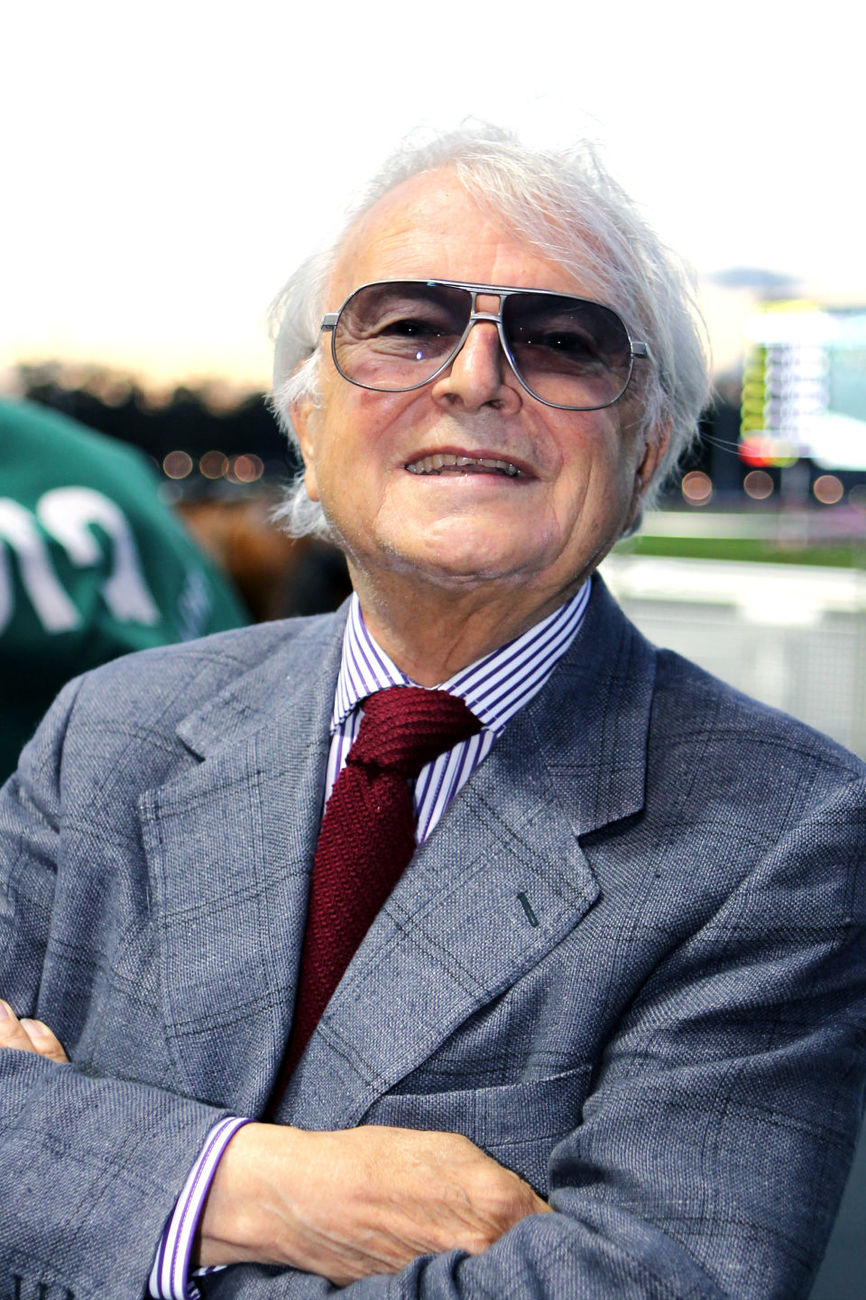
- de Senneville in 2020

Background information
- Born: Paul de Senneville; 30 July 1933
- Origin: Paris, France
- Died: 23 June 2023 (aged 89)
- Genres: Instrumental pop Classical; Easy listening
- Occupations: Composer, Music Producer
- Years active: 1976–2023
- Label: Delphine

Paul de Senneville (30 July 1933 – 23 June 2023) was a French composer and music producer.

== Career ==
De Senneville began his career as a journalist working for French newspapers such as France Soir. Later, he became a television program producer as well. In 1974, Paul de Senneville set up his own record company, Delphine Records (named after Paul's first daughter, Delphine), with Olivier Toussaint.

In 1988 he created Delphine Software International, a video game development company.

== Music career ==
As a director of a record company, Delphine Records, he started a new career on the basis of his passion in life: music.

After writing his first song in 1962, he contributed music for songs in many movie soundtracks produced by French companies such as Universe Galaxie and Daber Films. In 1968, while managing Michel Polnareff's career, he met Olivier Toussaint, with the two later forming a successful songwriting partnership. Their songs were recorded by major French artists such as: Mireille Mathieu, Michèle Torr, Christophe, Hervé Vilard, Dalida, Petula Clark and Claude François. This partnership accounts for over 100 million records sold internationally. Partnering with lyricist Jean-Loup Dabadie, he wrote Tous les bateaux, tous les oiseaux, a French hit recorded by Michel Polnareff.

The pair got involved in production and started the group Pop Concerto Orchestra, on which Toussaint sang lead. Soon after, they launched their second group Anarchic System that produced Rock & roll. Over a period of 5 years, the two groups sold millions of records.

== Dolannes Mélodie ==
The success of "Dolannes Mélodie" launched the career of trumpet player Jean-Claude Borelly. The song reached #1 on the charts of France, Switzerland, Belgium and became a Top 10 hit in Germany, Austria, and the Netherlands. It reached first place in South America and later in Japan.

In 1978, Paul was represented by both France and Monaco in the Eurovision Song Contest 1978 by his composition, Les jardins de Monaco as a duet. In 1976, he and Olivier were nominated for the prestigious award César Award for Best Original Music for their movie scores in the film "Un linceul n'a pas de poches".

== Delphine Records ==
In the early 1970s, Paul and Olivier set up their own record label, Delphine Records named after Paul's first daughter, Delphine Deschodt. Delphine is a leading French music exporter and specialist in instrumental music.

Besides Jean-Claude Borelly, they discovered French instrumentalists such as Richard Clayderman (1976), Nicolas de Angelis (1981) and Diego Modena (1991).

De Senneville and Toussaint collaborated with various French arrangers such as: Gérard Salesses, Hervé Roy, Bruno Ribera, and Marc Minier. Their main music productions were devoted to Clayderman's music.

"Ballade pour Adeline", "A Comme Amour" and "Lettre à ma Mère" are the biggest hits in Clayderman's recordings. These melodies were originally composed by de Senneville. He composed around 400 melodies for Clayderman. Toussaint and Jean Baudlot were his composition partners.

Delphine group represents 15 companies as an advertising film and clip production company, an agency for advertising and casting actors and a casting agency as well as two modelling agencies. They have 4 recording studios in their "hotel particulier".

== Personal life and death ==
Paul de Senneville enjoyed classical music. Giuseppe Verdi was one of his favorites. He collected modern paintings and antique objects. He owned a horse statue made by Salvador Dalí.

De Senneville was the owner of racehorse L'Amiral Mauzun working with Jean-Philippe Ducher. The horse won the Elitloppet in 2007 among other races.

De Senneville died on 23 June 2023, at the age of 89.

== Compositions ==
- Dolannes Mélodie (1975)
- Ballade pour Adeline (1977)
- A comme amour (1978)
- Les jardins de Monaco (with Olivier Toussaint) (1978)
- Mariage d'amour (1978)
- Lettre à ma mère (1979)
- Souvenir d'enfance (1985)
- Eléana (1987)
- Sagittaire (1988)
- Song of Ocarina (1991)
- Comme ils sont loin les souvenirs (1994)
- Hungarian Sonata (1997)
- Chinese Garden (1998)
- Princesse du désert (1999)
- J 'aime les gens qui s'aiment (2001)
- Pour tout l'amour du monde (2004)
- Tous Les Bateaux, Tous Les Oiseaux

=== Compositions for movies ===
- 1974 Convoy of Women
- 1974 Celestine, Maid at Your Service
- 1974 No Pockets in a Shroud
- 1974 French Romance
- 1975 Tamara ou Comment j'ai enterré ma vie de jeune fille
- 1975 Par ici la monnaie ou Les démerdards
- 1975 Dangerous Passions
- 1975 Comment se divertir quand on est cocu mais intelligent
- 1975 Peeping Tom in the Lime Light
- 1975 L'arrière-train sifflera trois fois
- 1976 French Erection
- 1977 La donneuse ou Comment avoir un enfant
- 1977 French Deep Throat
- 1977 Des collégiennes très... spéciales
- 1977 Un amour de sable
- 1978 And Long Live Liberty
- 1978 Les putes infernales
- 1979 A Very Special Woman
- 1979 La nuit de l'été
- 1983 Baby Cat
- 1984 Irreconcilable Differences
