= Mariage d'amour =

Piano piece by Paul de Senneville

Song by Richard Clayderman

from the album Lettre à Ma Mère
- Published: 1979
- Released: 1979
- Length: 2:41 [Richard Clayderman] 4:23 [George Davidson]
- Composer(s): Paul de Senneville

"Mariage d'amour" ("Marriage of Love") is a piece of French solo piano music, composed by Paul de Senneville in 1978, and first performed by the pianist Richard Clayderman from his album Lettre À Ma Mère in 1979.

Later, pianist George Davidson performed this piece of music from his album My Heart Will Go On with a slightly different arrangement.

This version by Davidson is sometimes erroneously attributed to Frédéric Chopin as "Spring Waltz" because of an upload on YouTube with the wrong title, which reached over 34 million views before being removed. As of August 2021, several new copies with that erroneous title are available on YouTube, and one of them has reached over 160 million views.

== Composition ==
The piece was written in the key of G minor. Having a tempo of around 72 bpm, the time signature changes several times, starting in 4/4, then moving on to 5/4 and 3/4, and then back to 4/4. It has a chord progression of Gm–Cm–F–B♭–D.
