= Nana Kinomi =

Japanese actress and singer

Nana Kinomi (木の実 ナナ, Kinomi Nana; born July 11, 1946, in Sumida, Tokyo, Japan) is a Japanese actress and singer.

== Selected works ==
- Kaze to Kumo to Niji to (1976)
- Daitokai Tatakai no Hibi (1976 episode, 25)
- Abunai Deka series
- Otoko wa tsurai yo: Stage-Struck Tora-san
- Yogoreta Eiyu (1982)
- Furuhata Ninzaburo (1994 episode, 6)

=== Singles ===
- "Omaesan"
- "Unebore Waltz"
- "Izakaya"
- "Nana"
