= Beach Volley =

1989 video game

- Developer: Ocean France
- Publisher: Ocean Software
- Designer: Marc Djan
- Programmer: Michel Janicki
- Artists: Michèle Bacqué; Philippe Dessoly; Pierre-Eric Loriaux
- Composer: Jean Baudlot
- Platforms: Amiga, Atari ST, Commodore 64, Amstrad CPC, ZX Spectrum
- Release: 1989
- Genre: Sports
- Mode: Up to 2 players simultaneously

Beach Volley is a beach volleyball video game developed by Ocean France for the Amiga, Atari ST, Amstrad CPC, Commodore 64, and ZX Spectrum, released by Ocean Software in 1989. A stranger interrupts a beach volleyball game and offering the player to join the "Ocean Beach Volley" worldwide tournament, to play against the best from eight other countries. The winner of this competition will receive $250,000.

Beach Volley is the first Ocean France product and one of the first Ocean games to be aimed for the Amiga and Atari ST.

== Gameplay ==
Match in Luxor

World Map + NY Skit

Follows the base ruleset of beach volleyball. Two teams of two players each trying to score by making the ball land inside the opponents half of the court. First team reaching seven points within six minutes wins and head to another of the eight countries. At five minutes of play, the music changes to a different tune to indicate the player to hurry up. If the player reach the six minutes limit, the player lose the game, even if the player are ahead in points. One or two player at once can play the game, but tournament mode is only available for single player. In single player mode the player will be joined by an AI controlled player. To help the human player a flickering blue cursor on the ground will indicate where the ball will be landing.

The world tournament consists of a single match in eight different countries, which is seen on a world map. The team starts in London and the final match will be held in Paris. The team had to take challenges in New York City, Nassau, Luxor, Sydney, Tokyo and Moscow in between too. Every hosting country will be introduced with a little humorous skit, which is usually related to their sights or locations.

== Reception ==
Reviews from 1989

"This is one of the most addictive games I've played in a long time."

— - 88% - CU Amiga-64

"Brilliant! All the fun of the real thing but without the risk of sunburn."

— 85% - ZZAP

"Beach Volley is certainly more interesting than your usual shoot 'em up."

— 8/10 - AUI

Reviews from 1991

"Trip away this flash facade and clever between level sequences, and there is a decidedly dull game cowering beneath."

— %43 - CU Amiga

"Don't let the cartoon graphics trick you into buying this poorly disguised variation on a poor tennis game" - 28%

— Amiga Power
