= Operation Stealth =

1990 video game

- European cover art
- Developer: Delphine Software
- Publishers: EU: U.S. Gold; NA: Interplay Productions
- Programmers: Paul Cuisset; Philippe Chastel; Jésus Martinez
- Artists: Michèle Bacqué; Emmanuel Lecoz
- Writers: Paul Cuisset; Philippe Chastel
- Composer: Jean Baudlot
- Engine: Cinématique evo1
- Platforms: Amiga, Atari ST, MS-DOS
- Release: 1990
- Genre: Adventure
- Mode: Single-player

Operation Stealth, also known as 007 James Bond: The Stealth Affair in the United States, is a 1990 adventure game from Delphine Software International. The game is mainly the work of Paul Cuisset (programming) and Jean Baudlot (sound).

The game was released with the Bond license in the United States, although this led to some inconsistencies as the MI6 agent appeared to be taking his orders from the CIA.

== Gameplay ==
Operation Stealth mainly features a point-and-click style of gameplay reminiscent of many of the LucasArts adventures of the time, as well as a number of more action-oriented elements, including an overhead viewed maze section and a scene in which Glames/Bond attempts to escape from an underwater cavern before he runs out of oxygen.

The cracked Amiga version of the game featured a primitive synthesized voice that would perform all the dialogue in the game if 1MB or more RAM was installed. The crack featured a bug which meant that if the player attempted to click the mouse button in order to skip through the speech faster the game would freeze and have to be rebooted.

== Plot ==
John Glames (James Bond in the U.S.), a CIA secret agent, has been assigned a mission to locate a newly designed high-tech F-19 type stealth plane in Latin America, which was stolen from NAS Miramar.

The protagonist visits the banana republic of Santa Paragua to investigate; upon meeting his contact, the agent is apparently assassinated and hands Glames the key to a bank slot where the case documents are kept. Once he retrieves an envelope, it turns out that the man he met was Colonel Karpov of the KGB; he explains that they captured the CIA contact and manipulated Glames to open his briefcase as he would know the combination. Karpov and Ostrovitch apprehend the documents and take Glames to a cave where he is left to die. However he escapes and swims back to town in one of the game's arcade sequences.

Wandering in a hotel, Glames is mistaken and welcomed as someone who happens to resemble him; a woman even attempts to assassinate Glames, but she is stopped when that person, Otto, shows up. Glames and the woman are captured by Otto's guards and thrown into the sea but Glames's actions save both of them.

The two are rescued and taken to a military base in a jungle. Glames learns that the woman is Julia Manigua, the niece of President Manigua; her uncle was replaced by Otto with an impostor figurehead, and a Liberation movement attempts to overthrow the puppet government. They enter the presidential palace during a festival posing as entertainers.

There, they are discovered and Julia is arrested, but Glames passes a series of mazes, while avoiding guards, and reaches Otto's office. He reclaims the documents from a safe (which Otto had recovered from the KGB agents), and once more he is apprehended by the two agents; that moment Otto emerges. Karpov escapes with the envelope and Glames pursues him on a water scooter chase, and then evades Otto's henchmen.

He is rescued by an American submarine. Inside, the chief debriefs him and explains that the Stealth fighter was stolen by the global criminal/terrorist organization Spyder led by Dr. Why and threatens to attack major cities around the world. The recovered documents indicate that the Stealth landed in a subterranean base, and Glames dives in a scuba gear to discover its underwater entrance.

Inside, Glames is arrested but escapes using some of his gadgets and reaches the base's headquarters where Dr. Why and Otto expect him, holding Julia as a hostage. The base surfaces as an artificial volcanic island and the Stealth is launched. Glames creates a diversion and destroys the base's computers, causing it to collapse, and the Stealth to become vulnerable. Dr. Why escapes with Julia on a helicopter which is hijacked by Glames.

He causes the helicopter to explode, but not before saving himself and Julia on an inflatable boat. In the end, he is honored as a national hero by General Manigua, with Julia on his side.

== Reception ==
Computer Gaming World described the game as "somewhat of a disappointment". The magazine criticized the game's hidden object game-like interface and clumsy parser, and stated that the graphics and music were inferior to that of Future Wars, and that the central plot had little connection to the game's puzzles and arcade sequences. Judith Kilbury-Cobb of the U.S. magazine .info gave the game four and a half stars and wrote, "The innovative interface is elegant in its simplicity and very easy to use. The stunning graphics are sharp, detailed, and complemented by first-rate sound and animation. No Bond fan should miss this one."

== See also ==
- David Wolf: Secret Agent, contemporaneous game involving a stolen Stealth fighter
