= Olivier Toussaint =

French composer and singer

- Origin: Paris, France
- Genres: Instrumental pop Classical; Easy listening
- Occupations: Composer, arranger Singer, recording producer
- Instruments: Guitar piano
- Years active: 1968–present
- Labels: Delphine Records; AZ

Olivier Toussaint is a French composer, pop singer, orchestra arranger, company manager, and record producer. He represented Monaco in the Eurovision Song Contest 1978.

== Early life ==
He was born in Paris, in a family of classical musicians. His great-grandfather, Gilbert Duprez was a very well known opera singer. His grandparents were both opera singers, and his mother was a concert pianist who played in big orchestras in France.

At the insistence of his mother, he studied economics and social sciences at University in Paris. But as soon as he graduated, he was back making music. He worked professionally as a singer and musician, playing guitar. At the same time he was involved in writing music for television and the cinema.

Classical music was a part of his life due to his family background, but it did not fit to his musical expectations. Other than classical music, he was very interested in jazz, easy listening, semi-classical, and pop music.

== Music career ==
=== Early years ===
He started a partnership with the French composer, Paul de Senneville in 1968. Soon after, they started to compose many songs together. Their collaboration got well known immediately, and their compositions were recorded by major French singers such as Michel Polnareff, Christophe, Dalida, Petula Clark, Claude François and Mireille Mathieu. They internationally sold more than 100 million records.

Olivier Toussaint and Paul de Senneville also got involved in music production business and started up the group "Pop Concerto Orchestra". In this group, Toussaint was a lead singer. Then they launched a second rock and roll group "Anarchic System". Over a period of 5 years, both of the groups sold several millions of records.

=== Career development ===
1975 was the major breakthrough for both Paul de Senneville and Olivier Toussaint with the triumph of "Dolannes Melodie" which launched the trumpet player Jean-Claude Borelly. They collaborated with the French composer/arranger Gérard Salesses, in arranging many of titles for Jean-Claude Borelly.

In 1976, Paul de Senneville and Olivier Tousaint set up their own record label, Delphine (named after de Senneville's first daughter). Delphine is one of the leading French music exporters to the world market. Soon after in 1976, they discovered Richard Clayderman, and established him as the top French record seller worldwide more than 65 million LPs sold. "Ballade pour Adeline", composed by Paul de Senneville and Olivier Tousaint, was the first song recorded by Richard Clayderman at Delphine studio, and it sold over 22 million singles in 38 countries through the years 1977 to 1979.

In 1977 the synthesizer project By the Savers (Olivier Toussaint together with French musicians Roland Romanelli and Jean Baudlot) released one single Help Me across Europe which didn't chart anywhere.

=== Success ===
The year 1978 was Olivier Toussaint's big success, attending in Monégasque entry in the Eurovision Song Contest 1978, and performing the duet "Les jardins de Monaco" ("The Gardens of Monaco") with the female singer "Caline" (pseudonym of Corinne Sauvage). It was succeeded as Monegasque representative at the 1979 Contest by Laurent Vaguener (pseudonym of Jean Baudlot) with "Notre vie c'est la musique".

In 1983, with the song "Eden is a magic world" (composed by Paul de Senneville), Olivier Toussaint got No.1 in the charts in France, Switzerland and Wallonia, the French speaking part of Belgium.

Since then, Olivier Toussaint has been the main manager to Delphine company, looking after over 40 employees and artists. Delphine company is nowadays several groups representing 15 companies dealing with various activities. Besides producing and recording music for several international instrumentalists such as Richard Clayderman, Nicolas de Angelis, and Ocarina group, Delphine activities is in instrumental an advertising film and clip production.

Olivier Toussaint is still involved with Richard Clayderman's career; managing his worldwide tours, producing his albums, etc.

== Discography ==
- 1974 – Electric Arena
- 1975 – Pop Concerto Orchestra
- 1975 – Anarchic System
- 1976 – Chérie Sha la la
- 1976 – Generation
- 1977 – She wears a Rainbow
- 1977 – Help me
- 1978 – I made up my mind to make love
- 1978 – Les jardins de Monaco (with Caline, ESC 1978 for Monaco)
- 1982 – Eden is a magic world
- 1985 – Divorce à Hollywood (aka Irreconcilable Differences, soundtrack)

== Filmography ==
- Casablanca Driver (2004) ("Pop Concerto Show")
- Un linceul n'a pas de poches (1974) (writer: "Dolannes Melodie")
- The Eurovision Song Contest (1978) (TV)

== See also ==
- Jean-Claude Borelly
- Les jardins de Monaco
- Eurovision Song Contest 1978

Awards and achievements
Preceded by Michèle Torr with "Une petite française"	Monaco in the Eurovision Song Contest (with Caline); 1978	Succeeded by Laurent Vaguener with "Notre vie c'est la musique"
