= Jean-Claude Borelly =

French trumpeter and composer (born 1953)

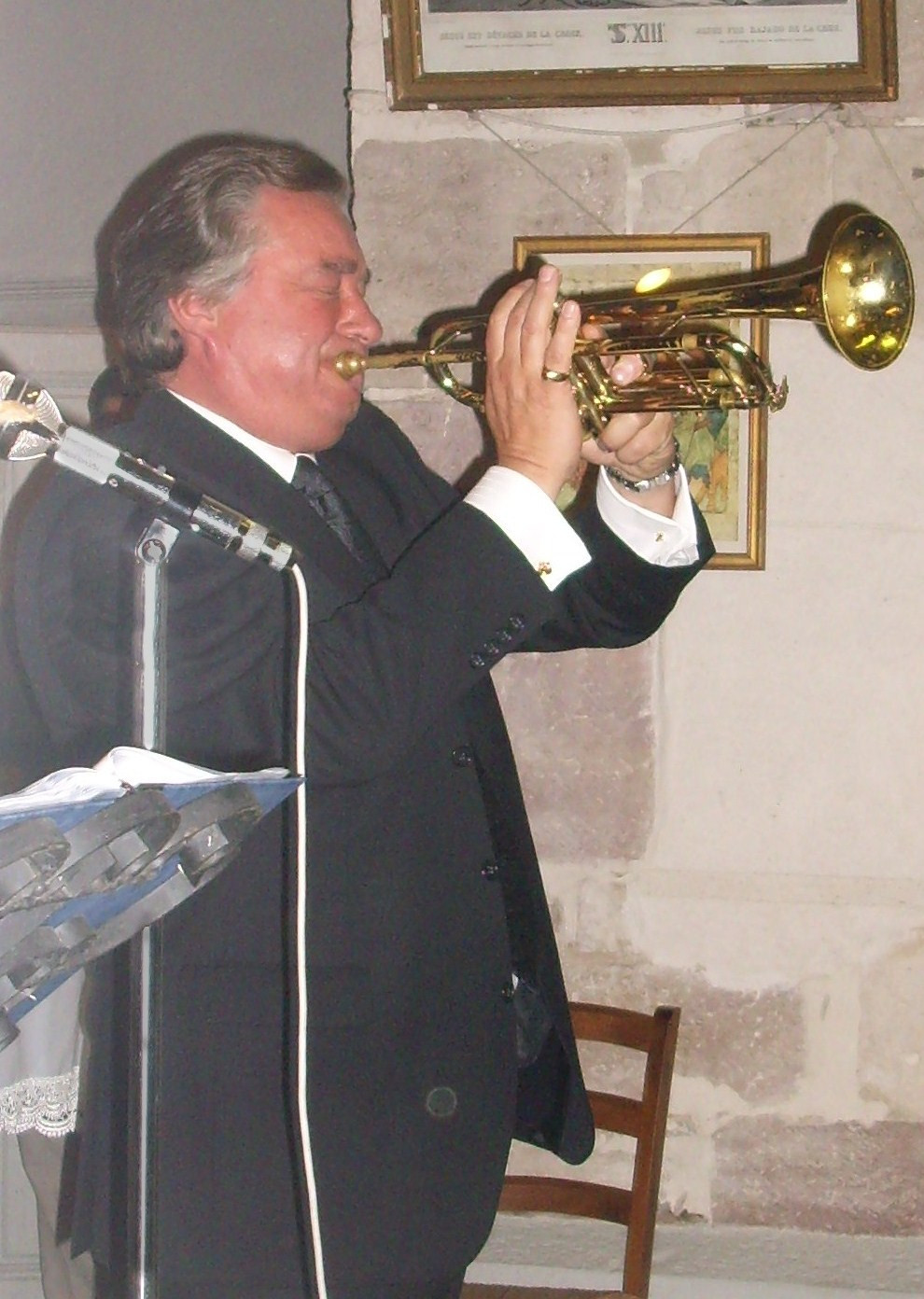
- Borelly performing in 2008

Background information
- Born: July 2, 1953 (age 73)
- Origin: Paris, France
- Genres: Instrumental pop Classical; Easy listening
- Occupations: trumpeter composer
- Instrument: trumpet
- Years active: 1975–present
- Labels: Delphine; Rock
- Website: borelly.com

Jean-Claude Borelly is a French trumpeter and composer.

== Background ==
At the age of seven he developed a passion for the trumpet after discovering Louis Armstrong on television. He met a prominent trumpeter of the Paris Opera who, touched by his fascination for the trumpet, introduced him to the instrument and accompanies all during his studies at the Conservatory and has the Normal School of Music.

== Early years ==
At the age of fourteen he had trumpet lessons at the school of music in Paris. When he was eighteen, Borelly wanted to share his passion so he started teaching the trumpet to the beginners at the school of music.

During the 1970s, Borelly became fanatical about rhythm and blues. He was so fond of it that he did not hesitate to give up his classical studies and start playing in bands.

== Dolannes Melodie ==
1975 was a turning point in Borelly's life. The recording of "Dolannes Melodie" (title theme of the film Un linceul n'a pas de poches) was about to change his future. This record quickly went to the Top 10 in the charts of most European countries, first in France, Switzerland, Belgium and then Germany, Austria, and the Netherlands; outside of Europe, it topped the charts in Mexico and was also successful in Japan, and reached #13 in Canada. It sold over one million copies, and was awarded a gold disc.

With "Dolannes Melodie", Borelly managed to introduce his own modern trumpet style. Together with Paul de Senneville and Olivier Toussaint (his composers/producers), he has developed a melodious and romantic style of music.

== Recent years ==
In 1995, he decided to move to Las Vegas. He gave several concerts. In 2000, he returned to France and, three years later, he composed and recorded The Sound of Lac d'Amour.

Since June 2006, his touring focuses on concerts in churches and cathedrals accompanied by his musicians and singers.

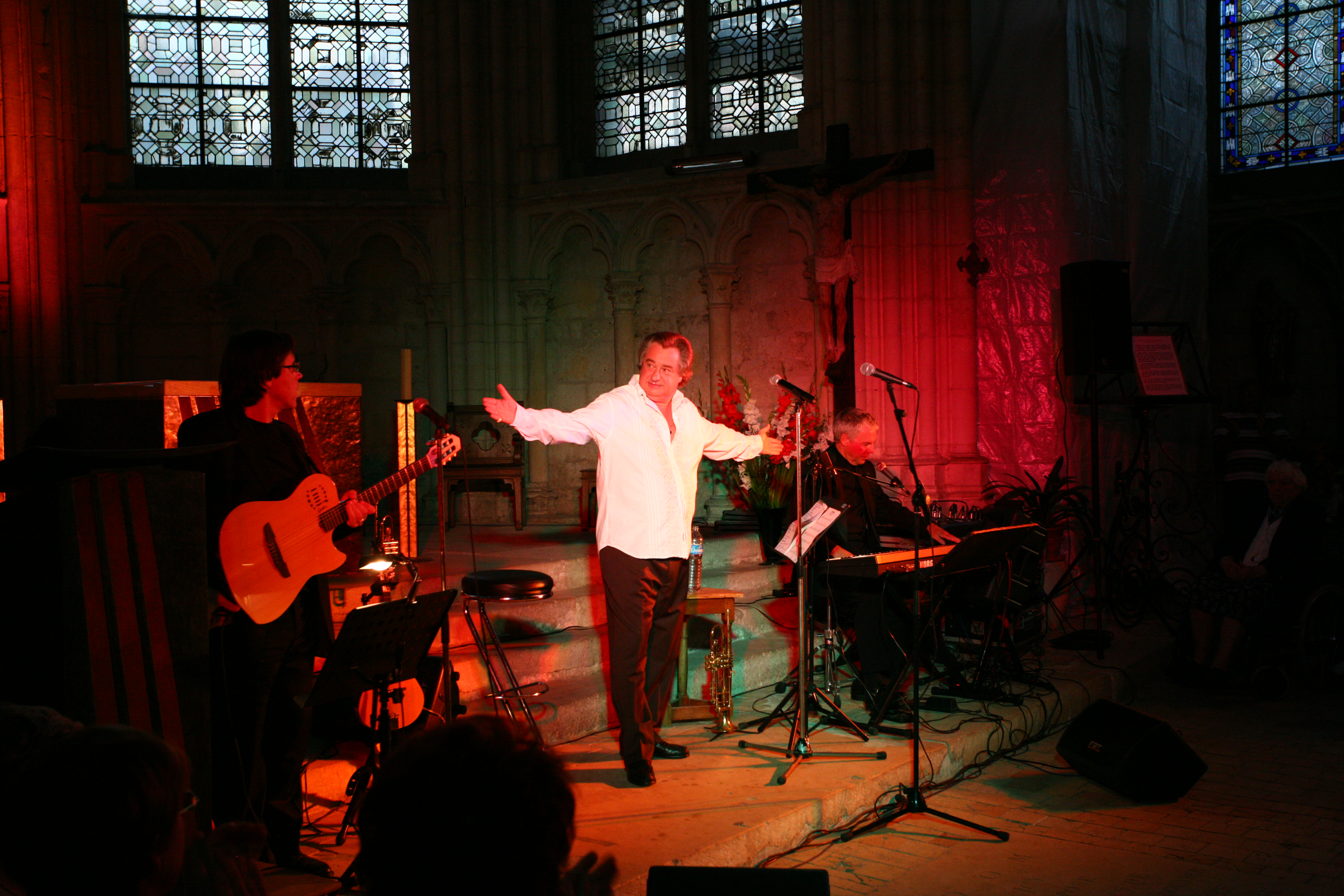
Borelly concert in a church (2009)

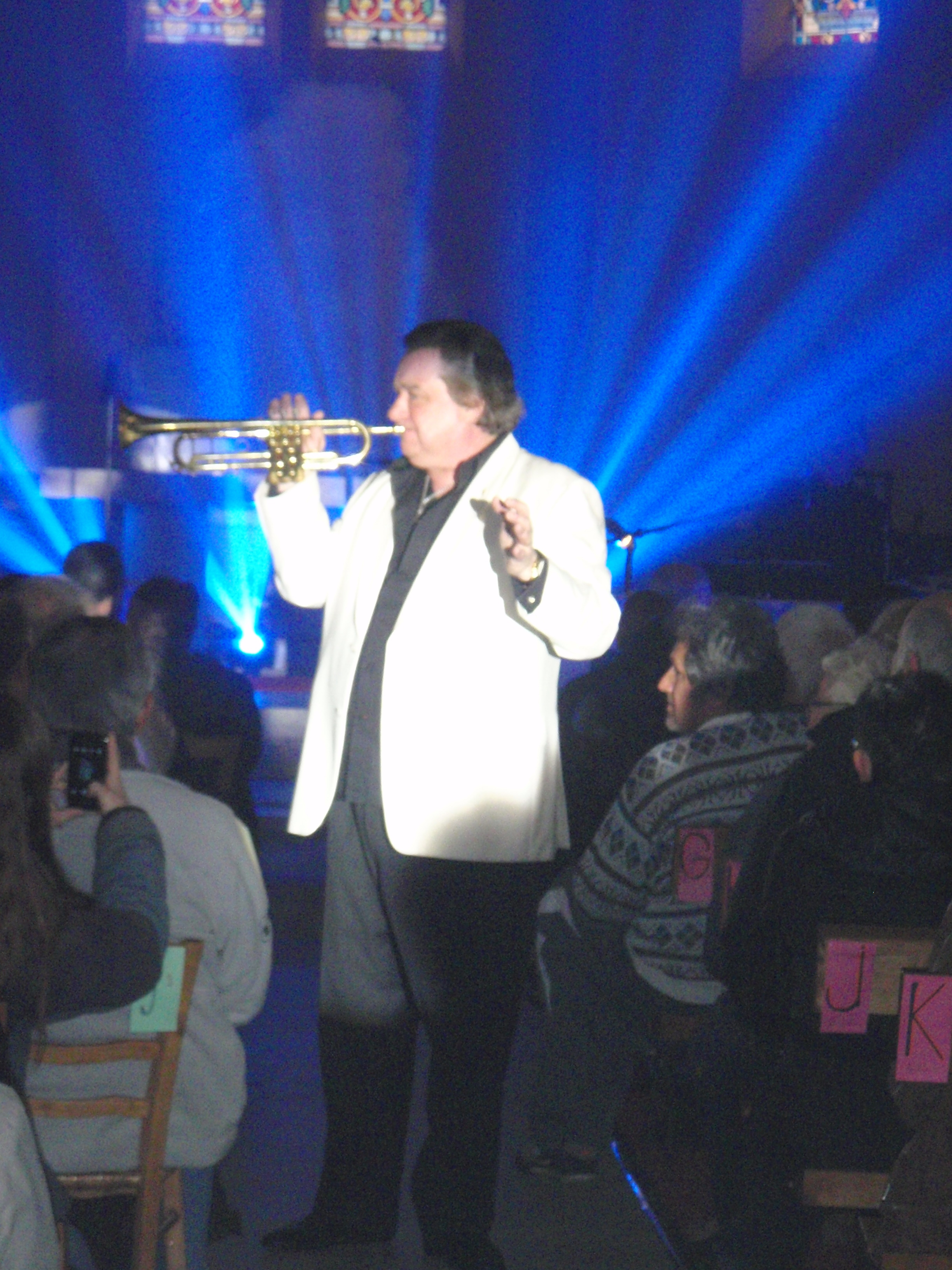
Borelly Trumpet Concert (2007)

== Discography ==
- Concerto de la mer
- Dolannes Mélodie
- Les 24 merveilles du monde la trompette (Vol 1)
- Les 24 merveilles du monde la trompette (Vol 2)
- Meilleur de Jean-Claude Borelly
- De Las Vegas à Paris
- La mélodie du lac d'amour
- Love follow us (Richard Clayderman with Delphine Artists)
- Love follow us 2 (Richard Clayderman with Delphine Artists)
- Friends France (Richard Clayderman with Delphine Artists)
- D'Or de Rêve et de Lumière

== See also ==
- List of trumpeters
- Richard Clayderman
