= Song of Ocarina =

Single by Jean Philippe Audin and Diego Modena

from the album Ocarina
- B-side: "Ocarina solo"
- Released: September 1991
- Genre: Instrumental
- Length: 3:40
- Label: Polydor
- Songwriter(s): Paul de Senneville
- Producer(s): Paul de Senneville; Marc Minier; Olivier Toussaint; Magic Sigwalt

Jean Philippe Audin and Diego Modena singles chronology
"Song of Ocarina" (1991)	"Implora" (1992)

"Song of Ocarina" is a 1991 song recorded by the musicians Jean-Philippe Audin and Diego Modena. It is entirely instrumental and is played on ocarina by Modena and cello by Audin. Released as the first single from the album Ocarina, it achieved a huge success in France where it topped the chart and remained in the top 100 for almost eight months.

== Song information ==
The song was composed by Paul de Senneville who was best known for composing "Ballade pour Adeline" for Richard Clayderman and had already written several pop songs in the 1980s for the band Pop Concerto Orchestra. In this instrumental duet, "the cello and the ocarina compete in expressiveness on a swinging rhythmic"; the ocarina "gives to the song a thin and air tone which makes us travel in the Andean heights", while the cello "adds to the music a melancholic touch and the depth of the notes of [the] archer".

== Chart performance ==
In France, "Song of Ocarina" debuted at number 37 on the chart edition of 5 October 1991 and climbed until reaching the top ten five weeks later. It hit the chart for non consecutive two weeks and remained for 21 weeks in the top ten and 32 weeks in the top 50. It was certified Gold disc by the Syndicat National de l'Édition Phonographique, and became the instrumental first number-one hit in the country. It achieved success in Belgium (Flanders) where it was a top six hit and remained in the top 40 for 19 weeks. In Switzerland, it achieved a minor success, staying for three weeks in the top 30 with a peak at number 14 on 26 January 1992. On the European Hot 100, it debuted at number 89 on 2 November 1991 and peaked at number 11 in its 12th week, and cumulated 34 weeks on the chart.

== Track listings ==
- 7" single
1. "Song of Ocarina" — 3:40
2. "Song of Ocarina" (ocarina solo) — 3:40
- CD maxi
1. "Song of Ocarina" — 3:40
2. "Song of Ocarina" (ocarina solo) — 3:40
3. "Song of Ocarina" (extended version)
- Cassette
1. "Song of Ocarina" — 3:40
2. "Song of Ocarina" (ocarina solo) — 3:40

== Charts ==
=== Weekly charts ===
Chart (1991–1992)	Peak position
Belgium (Ultratop 50 Flanders)	6
Belgium (Ultratop 50 Wallonia)	3
Europe (European Hot 100)	11
France (SNEP)	1
Netherlands (Dutch Top 40)	16
Netherlands (Single Top 100)	18
Quebec (ADISQ)	21
Switzerland (Schweizer Hitparade)	14

=== Year-end charts ===
Chart (1992)	Position
Belgium (Ultratop 50 Flanders)	9
Europe (Eurochart Hot 100)	40

== Certifications ==
Certifications for "Song of Ocarina"
Region	Certification	Certified units/sales
France (SNEP)	Gold	250,000^{*}
^{*} Sales figures based on certification alone.

== See also ==
- List of number-one singles of 1992 (France)
