= Stage-Struck Tora-san =

- Theatrical poster
- Directed by: Yoji Yamada
- Written by: Yoji Yamada; Yoshitaka Asama
- Starring: Kiyoshi Atsumi; Nana Kinomi
- Cinematography: Tetsuo Takaba
- Edited by: Iwao Ishii
- Music by: Naozumi Yamamoto
- Distributed by: Shochiku
- Release date: August 5, 1978
- Running time: 107 minutes
- Country: Japan
- Language: Japanese

Stage-Struck Tora-san (男はつらいよ 寅次郎わが道をゆく, Otoko wa Tsurai yo: Torajirō Wagamichi o Yuku) aka Tora-san's Stage-Struck is a 1978 Japanese comedy film directed by Yoji Yamada. It stars Kiyoshi Atsumi as Torajirō Kuruma (Tora-san), and Nana Kinomi as his love interest or "Madonna". Stage-Struck Tora-san is the twenty-first entry in the popular, long-running Otoko wa Tsurai yo series.

== Synopsis ==
Tora-san returns from his travels throughout Japan to his family's home in Tokyo to find his uncle recovering from an illness. After a family fight erupts, he returns to the road and becomes friends with Tomekichi. When the pair come to Tokyo, they both fall in love with stage dancers.

== Cast ==
- Kiyoshi Atsumi as Torajirō
- Chieko Baisho as Sakura
- Nana Kinomi as Nanako Beni
- Tetsuya Takeda as Tomekichi Gotō
- Masami Shimojō as Kuruma Tatsuzō
- Chieko Misaki as Tsune Kuruma (Torajiro's aunt)
- Gin Maeda as Hiroshi Suwa
- Hayato Nakamura as Mitsuo Suwa
- Hisao Dazai as Boss (Umetarō Katsura)
- Gajirō Satō as Genkō
- Hiroshi Inuzuka
- Raita Ryū as Detective
- Chishū Ryū as Gozen-sama
- Shinobu Azusa as Shinobu Fuji

== Critical appraisal ==
Kiyoshi Atsumi was nominated for Best Actor at the Japan Academy Prize ceremony for his work in Stage-Struck Tora-san and the following film in the series, Talk of the Town Tora-san (also 1978). Yoji Yamada was also nominated for Best Director for these two films.

Stuart Galbraith IV writes that Stage-Struck Tora-san is one of the weaker entries in the Otoko wa Tsurai yo series. He notes that co-star Tetsuya Takeda, a popular comic actor in Japan at the time, comes across as hammy in western eyes. According to Galbraith, the film works best as a nostalgic look at late-1970s popular culture. The opening dream segment is a spoof of Close Encounters of the Third Kind (1977), and there are references to Pink Lady as well as glimpses into Japan's economic situation of the era. The German-language site molodezhnaja gives Stage-Struck Tora-san three out of five stars.

== Availability ==
Stage-Struck Tora-san was released theatrically on August 5, 1978. In Japan, the film was released on videotape in 1996, and in DVD format in 2002 and 2005.
