= Eduardo Egüez =

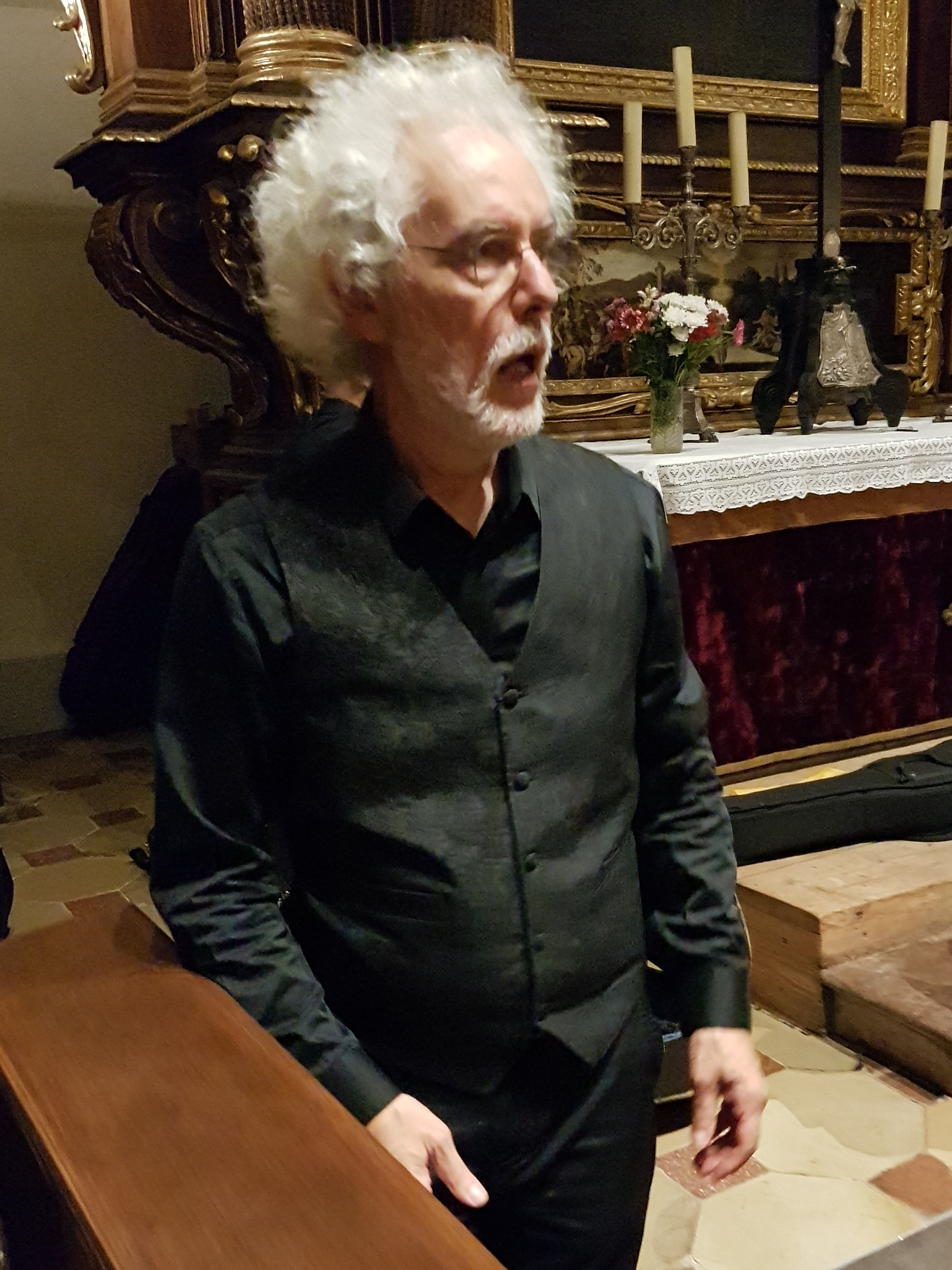
- Egüez in 2024.

Background information
- Born: Buenos Aires, Argentina
- Occupation: Musician Lutenist

Eduardo Egüez (born in Buenos Aires, Argentina in 1959) is a lutenist, theorbist, and guitarist acclaimed for his interpretations of music by J.S.Bach.

Egüez began by first studying guitar with Miguel Angel Girollet and Eduardo Fernández. He then studied composition at the Catholic Argentine University. In 1995 he obtained his diploma in lute performance from the Schola Cantorum Basiliensis under the tutelage of Hopkinson Smith. Eduardo Egüez teaches lute and basso continuo at the Zürich Conservatory (Switzerland).

== Performances ==
Eduardo Egüez has given many solo recitals in South America, Europe, Australia, and Japan. He received awards from Promociones Musicales in Buenos Aires, 1984; Círculo Guitarrístico Argentino in Buenos Aires, 1984; Concours International de Guitare in Paris (Radio France), 1986; V Concurso Internacional de Guitarra (Jacinto and Inocencio Guerrero Foundation) in Madrid, 1989.

He has also performed as a basso continuo player, as a member of such ensembles as Elyma, Hesperion XXI, Ensemble Baroque de Limoges, La Grande Écurie et la Chambre du Roy, Aurora, Concerto Italiano, Labyrinto, The Rare Fruits Council, Café Zimmermann, Les Sacqueboutiers, Ricercar Consort, „Stylus Phantasticus“ and his own ensemble La Chimera. Furthermore, he has also accompanied artists such as Furio Zanasi, Emma Kirkby, María Cristina Kiehr, Rolf Lislevand, Victor Torres inter alia.

== Recordings ==
Eduardo Egüez has recorded for many labels: Astrée Auvidis, Astrée Naïve, Arcana, Glossa Music, K617, Opus 111, Alia Vox, E Lucevan le Stelle, Stradivarius, Symphonia, Alpha Records, Ambroisie, Naxos Records, Flora, Mirare, Accent Records, Harmonia Mundi France. As a soloist he has recorded “Tombeau” with works by Silvius Leopold Weiss (E Lucevan le Stelle), the complete lute works by J. S. Bach (M.A. recordings) and “Le Maître du Roi” with works by Robert de Visée (also M.A. recordings).

With his own Ensemble La Chimera, he has recorded for the label M.A. recordings “Buenos Aires Madrigal” (fusion of early Italian madrigals and Argentine tango) and “Tonos y Tonadas” (fusion of early Spanish “tonos humanos” and folk music from Latin America).

=== Selected discography ===
Album title	Label	Catalog #	Year released	Notes
The Lute Music of Johann Sebastian Bach - volume 1	MA	M053A	2000	Recorded October 1999 in Cathedral of the Convento Dell'Annuziata, Rovato, Italy
The Lute Music of Johann Sebastian Bach - volume 2	MA	M054A	2002	Recorded in Cathedral of the Convento Dell'Annuziata, Rovato, Italy
The King's Teacher - Works of Robert de Visée	MA	M064A	2003	Recorded November 2002 in Cathedral of the Convento Dell'Annuziata, Rovato, Italy
L'Infidèle - Works of Sylvius Leopold Weiss	MA	M078A	2009	Recorded June 2005 in Chiesa di San Bernardino da Siena, Piano Audi, Comune di Corio, Piemonte, Italy
L'Infidèle - Works of Sylvius Leopold Weiss	MA	M078A	2009	Recorded June 2005 in Chiesa di San Bernardino da Siena, Piano Audi, Comune di Corio, Piemonte, Italy
La Voce di Orfeo: A tribute to Francesco Rasi	Naive	E8925	2009	La Chimera ensemble, with Furio Zanasi (baritone)
Odisea Negra: Music From 17th Century South America & Caribbean	Naive	E8931	2011	La Chimera ensemble, with Ivan Garcia (vocals), Ablaye Cissoko (vocals, kora, drums). Compositions by Martínez Compañón, Gaspar Fernandes (1565-1629), Miguel Matamoros, Carmito Gamboa, Gilberto Valdés. Readings of poems by Nicolás Guillén (Cuba) and Manuel del Cabral (Dominican Republic).
Amarante: Airs de Cour	Flora	FLORA2210	2012	with Céline Scheen (soprano), Philippe Pierlot (basse de viole)
'O felice occhi miei' - Lute Music from Renaissance Italy	Glossa	GCD923541	2024	with La Compagnia del Madrigale
