= Nilda Fernández =

Spanish-born French singer (1951–2019)

Nilda Fernandez
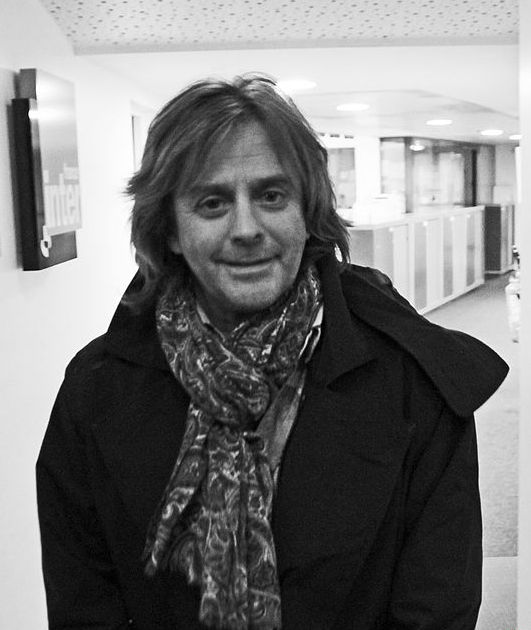
- Nilda Fernandez in February 2013

Background information
- Born: Daniel Fernández; 25 October 1957; Barcelona, Catalonia, Spain
- Died: 19 May 2019 (aged 67)
- Genres: Pop, Shanson
- Occupation: Singer
- Years active: 1981–2019
- Formerly of: Mercedes Sosa; Jane Birkin; Patrick Bruel; Jacques Dutronc; Boris Moiseev

Nilda Fernandez (27 October 1951 – 19 May 2019) was a French singer of Spanish descent.

== Biography ==
Daniel Fernandez was born on 27 October 1951 in de Sants neighbourhood of Barcelona. His family was of Andalusian Protestant descendant, and when the boy turned 6 years old, Daniel's parents moved to France and settled in Lyon. Later, Daniel returned to his native Spain and studied philology in Barcelona.

His first record Le Bonheur Comptant was released in 1981, but remained unnoticed (now it does not even enter into the official discography). After this, Daniel took up a variety of humble jobs to support himself, all the while singing in front of small audiences and eventually adopting the pseudonym Nilda, rearranging the letters in his name. In 1987, Nilda records the single Madrid, Madrid, but the actual fame arrived a few years later, in 1991, with the release of an eponymous album containing 'Nos fiancailles', 'L'invitation à Venise' and, again, 'Madrid Madrid'. Nilda receives 5 nominations to the prestigious French 'Victoires de la Musique' awards, and walks away as 'Best Male Promise' of the year. In the same year the singer also receives the Grand Prix de l'Académie Charles Cros. In 1993 Nilda releases another eponymous album, containing 'Marie-Madeleine', 'On t'a appris' and 'Sinfanai Retu' which is well received.

In 1995, Nilda released a novel titled Ça repart pour un soliloque, written on behalf of a woman, which caused an endless flow of questions from journalists about his sexual orientation. And later, during his collaboration with Russian pop singer Boris Moiseev, the artist was presented as gay.

In 1999, with Castelar 704, he wrote poems by Federico García Lorca (1898–1936), with Spanish guitarists, among them Tomatito, following Paco Ibáñez. In 1996, after paying tribute to Gérard Manset in a collective album, he sang in 1999, co-productions of the titles of his favorite French singers: Léo Ferré, Barbara, Jacques Dutronc, Michel Polnareff, Jane Birkin, Dick Annegarn, etc.

Nilda Fernández disappeared from the front stage after a tour in Russia (2000), choosing to stay in Russia and live there for the next 5 years. In 2006 he returns with concerts in France, Belgium, Russia and Switzerland and Cuba at the invitation of the French Alliance of Havana and Santiago de Cuba.

In March 2007, the second book by Nilda Les Chants du monde is published, based on a diary written by the artist during the years he lived in Russia.

Fernández returnes to the French stage with the album 'Ti amo', which was entirely recorded in Genova, Italy, and released on 8 January 2010.

In 2017 Parisian publisher l'Archipel releases Nilda's autobiography, 'Contes de mes 1001 vies', in which the singer freely narrates episodes and adventures from his life as a nomadic singer, reconstructs his family's genealogy and remembers his childhood and teenage years between France and Spain.

Nilda Fernandez died on 19 May 2019 in his hometown Bize-Minervois, at the age of 67, after a heart failure.

== Discography ==
- 1981: Le Bonheur Comptant
- 1991: Nilda Fernández
- 1992: 500 años (Spanish version of the 1991 "Nilda Fernández" album)
- 1993: Nilda Fernández
- 1993: Compiègne, en vivo
- 1995: Los días aquellos (Spanish version of the 1993 "Nilda Fernández" album)
- 1997: Innu Nikamu
- 1998: Niña bonita (Spanish version of "Innu Nikamu")
- 1999: Castelar 704
- 1999: Mes hommages
- 2000: Best of
- 2000: Collection privée, 3 CD
- 2007: Bestov vol. 2
- 2010: Nilda Fernández (Ti Amo)
- 2013: Basta Ya
