= Nicolas de Angelis =

French classical guitarist

- Origin: Saint-Cloud, France
- Genres: Instrumental; Classical; Easy listening
- Occupation: Guitarist
- Instrument: Guitar
- Years active: 1980–present
- Labels: Delphine; Rock Records

Nicolas de Angelis (born 1949) is a French classical guitarist.

== Early years ==
Born in Saint-Cloud, a west Parisian suburb along the shores of the Seine River, de Angelis studied guitar at the Paris Academy from the age of ten. De Angelis started the guitar with a teacher from the Paris Academy who first inspired his great love of the instrument.

At sixteen he belonged to a small group of very talented French musicians, among them Michel Berger. From the age of eighteen, he lent his talent to many pop stars such as Julien Clerc, Sylvie Vartan and Fabienne Thibault, composer and clarinettist Jean-Christian Michel, and soon became one of the most requested session musicians.

== Song for Anna ==
In 1981 he recorded his first solo LP, Quelques Notes Pour Anna. This album achieved Gold record sales within a few weeks, and paved the way for his further successes.

== Discography ==
- 1981 Quelques notes pour Anna
- 1982 Amour mon Amour
- 1985 Grand Concert
- 1985 Guitar Guitar (AUS #40)
- 1985 Jalouse (Toute la guitar)
- 1985 Les Sonates (with Richard Clayderman)
- 1986 L'amour à plein coeur
- 1986 Romantic Rendez-vous
- 1987 Soleil
- 1996 Love follow us
- 1997 Love follow us 2
- 1998 Friends France
- 1998 Le Meilleur de la guitare

== See also ==
- List of guitarists
- Delphine Records
