= Delphine Records =

French record label

- Founded: 1974; 52 years ago
- Founder: Paul de Senneville, Olivier Toussaint
- Genre: Various
- Country of origin: France
- Location: Paris

Delphine Records or Delphine Productions is a French record label, founded in 1974 by French composer Paul de Senneville and his partner Olivier Toussaint.

== History ==
In 1974, Paul de Senneville set up his own record company, Delphine (named after Paul's first daughter, Delphine), with Olivier Toussaint.

Delphine in one of the leading French music exporters to the world market. It is also the only company specialising in instrumental music. Nowadays, the Delphine group represents 15 companies dealing with various activities: an advertising film and clip production company, an agency for advertising and casting actors and a casting agency, as well as two modelling agencies.

This Delphine is not to be confused with a small independent American record label started approximately 30 years later called Delphine Records.

== Delphine Records artists ==
- Richard Clayderman
- Nicolas de Angelis
- Jean-Claude Borelly
- Anarchic System
- Ocarina

== See also ==
- List of record labels
- Delphine Software International
