= Instrumental =

Music without vocals

An instrumental, instrumental music, or sometimes "instrumental song" is music without any vocals, although it might include some inarticulate vocals, such as shouted backup vocals in a big band setting. Through semantic widening, a broader sense of the word "song" may refer to instrumentals. The music is primarily or exclusively produced using musical instruments. An instrumental can exist in music notation, after it is written by a composer; in the mind of one or more composers in question (especially in cases where they will perform the piece, as in the case of a blues solo guitarist or a folk music fiddle player); as a piece that is performed live by a single instrumentalist or a musical ensemble, which could range in components from a duo or trio to a large big band, concert band or orchestra.

In a song that is otherwise sung, a section that is not sung but which is played by instruments can be called an instrumental interlude, or, if it occurs at the beginning of the song, before the singer starts to sing, an instrumental introduction. If the instrumental section highlights the skill, musicality, and often the virtuosity of one or more particular performers, the section may be called a "solo" (e.g., the guitar solo that is a key section of heavy metal music and hard rock songs). If the instruments are percussion ones, the interlude can be called a percussion interlude or "percussion break". These interludes are a form of break in the song.

== In popular music ==
"Theme Q" by Steve Combs & Delta Is: an instrumental piece played on bass, drum, guitar, keyboard (4 min 53 s)

In commercial popular music, instrumental tracks are sometimes renderings, remixes of a corresponding release that features vocals, but they may also be compositions originally conceived without vocals. One example of a genre in which both vocal/instrumental and solely instrumental songs are produced is blues. A blues band often uses mostly songs that have lyrics that are sung, but during the band's show, they may also perform instrumental songs which only include electric guitar, harmonica, upright bass/electric bass and drum kit. Instrumental versions of songs can also be used to create remixes and mashups or used in DJ sets. If an instrumental version of a track is not released, it can be created through stem separation/vocal removal.

== Number-one instrumentals ==
Title	Artist	Country	Reached number-one
"Frenesi"	Artie Shaw	US	1940
"Song of the Volga Boatmen"	Glenn Miller	US	1941
Piano Concerto in B Flat	Freddy Martin	US	1941
"A String of Pearls"	Glenn Miller	US	1942
"Moonlight Cocktail"	Glenn Miller	US	1942
"Heartaches"	Ted Weems	US	1947
"Twelfth Street Rag"	Pee Wee Hunt	US	1948
"Blue Tango"	Leroy Anderson	US	1952
"The Song from Moulin Rouge"	Mantovani	UK	1953
"Oh Mein Papa" (Note: Contains several vocal interjections of the title.)	Eddie Calvert	UK	1954
"Let's Have Another Party"	Winifred Atwell	UK	1954
"Cherry Pink (and Apple Blossom White)"	Pérez Prado	UK	1955
"Cherry Pink (and Apple Blossom White)"	Pérez Prado	US	1955
"Cherry Pink (and Apple Blossom White)"	Eddie Calvert	UK	1955
"Cherry Pink (and Apple Blossom White)"	Pérez Prado	Germany	1955
"Autumn Leaves"	Roger Williams	US	1955
"Lisbon Antigua"	Nelson Riddle	US	1956
"The Poor People of Paris"	Les Baxter	US	1956
"The Poor People of Paris"	Winifred Atwell	UK	1956
"Moonglow and Theme from Picnic"	Morris Stoloff	US	1956
"Tequila" (Note: Features vocal interjections of the title at the end of each chorus.)	The Champs	US	1958
"Patricia"	Pérez Prado	US	1958
"Patricia"	Pérez Prado	Germany	1958
"Hoots Mon" (Note: Contains several Scottish-sounding grunts at the end of each chorus and immediately beforehand.)	Lord Rockingham's XI	UK	1958
"Side Saddle"	Russ Conway	UK	1959
"The Happy Organ"	Dave "Baby" Cortez	US	1959
"Roulette"	Russ Conway	UK	1959
"Sleep Walk"	Santo & Johnny	US	1959
"Theme from A Summer Place"	Percy Faith	US	1960
"Apache"	The Shadows	UK	1960
"Wonderland by Night"	Bert Kaempfert	US	1961
"Calcutta"	Lawrence Welk	US	1961
"On the Rebound"	Floyd Cramer	UK	1961
"Kon-Tiki"	The Shadows	UK	1961
"Mexico"	Bob Moore	Germany	1962
"Wonderful Land"	The Shadows	UK	1962
"Nut Rocker"	B. Bumble and the Stingers	UK	1962
"Stranger on the Shore"	Acker Bilk	US/UK (Note: Stranger on the Shore hit #1 on the end of year UK charts, but NOT the weekly UK charts. Despite this, it is the highest selling instrumental single worldwide and in the UK; in the US, this honor falls to Meco's Star Wars Theme/Cantina Band.)	1962
"The Stripper"	David Rose	US	1962
"Telstar"	The Tornados	UK	1962
"Telstar"	The Tornados	US	1962
"Dance On!"	The Shadows	UK	1963
"Diamonds"	Jet Harris and Tony Meehan	UK	1963
"Telstar"	The Tornados	France	1963
"Foot Tapper"	The Shadows	UK	1963
"Il Silenzio"	Nini Rosso	Germany	1965
"A Taste of Honey"	Herb Alpert & The Tijuana Brass	US	1965
"Love is Blue"	Paul Mauriat	US	1968
"The Good, the Bad and the Ugly"	Hugo Montenegro	US	1968
"Grazing in the Grass"	Hugh Masekela	US	1968
"The Good, the Bad and the Ugly"	Hugo Montenegro, his Orchestra and Chorus	UK	1968
"Albatross"	Fleetwood Mac	UK	1969
"Love Theme from Romeo and Juliet"	Henry Mancini	US	1969
"Amazing Grace"	Royal Scots Dragoon Guards	UK	1972
"Popcorn"	Hot Butter	France	1972
"Mouldy Old Dough" (Note: Contains vocal interjections before, during, and immediately after the choruses.)	Lieutenant Pigeon	UK	1972
"Frankenstein"	The Edgar Winter Group	US	1973
"Eye Level"	Simon Park Orchestra	UK	1973
"Love's Theme"	The Love Unlimited Orchestra	US	1974
"TSOP (The Sound of Philadelphia)" (Note: Contains vocals at the beginning and during the fade-out.)	MFSB featuring The Three Degrees	US	1974
"Pick Up the Pieces" (Note: Contains vocal interjections at the end of the second and third verses.)	Average White Band	US	1975
"The Hustle" (Note: Contains vocal interjections of "do the hustle!" at the end of each chorus.)	Van McCoy and the Soul City Symphony	US	1975
"Fly, Robin, Fly" (Note: Contains vocal interjections of the title at the end of each chorus and "up, up to the sky" as an ending.)	Silver Convention	US	1975
"Theme from S.W.A.T."	Rhythm Heritage	US	1976
"A Fifth of Beethoven"	Walter Murphy	US	1976
"Gonna Fly Now" (Note: Contains vocals, which total thirty words and thus contains the most lyrics of any song classified as an instrumental which has hit number 1.)	Bill Conti	US	1977
"Star Wars Theme/Cantina Band"	Meco	US	1977
"Rise"	Herb Alpert	US	1979
"One Step Beyond" (Note: Includes spoken introduction, and vocal interjections of the song title and "Here we go" at several points during the song.)	Madness	France	1980
"Chariots of Fire"	Vangelis	US	1982
"Miami Vice Theme"	Jan Hammer	US	1985
"Song of Ocarina"	Jean-Philippe Audin and Diego Modena	France	1992
"Doop" (Note: Contains, during its choruses, several nonsensical vocal interjections of the title.)	Doop	UK	1994
"Guaglione"	Perez Prado	Republic of Ireland	1994
"The X-Files"	Mark Snow	France	1996
"Flat Beat" (Note: At the beginning, before the main piece begins, it features the lyrics "Oh yeah, I used to know Quentin, he's a real, he's a real jerk".)	Mr. Oizo	UK	1999
"Bromance" (Note: Bromance was an instrumental before being re-released as "Seek Bromance" with vocals by Amanda Wilson from the song "Love U Seek" by Italian DJ Samuele Sartini.)	Tim Berg (Avicii)	Belgium (Flanders)	2010
"Harlem Shake" (Note: Contains samples of the lines "Con los terroristas" from a remix of the 2006 reggaeton single "Maldades" by Héctor Delgado and "Do the Harlem shake" from "Miller Time" by Plastic Little.)	Baauer	Australia/New Zealand	2013
"Harlem Shake"	Baauer	US	2013
"Animals" (Note: "We're the fucking animals" is said twice.)	Martin Garrix	Belgium (Flanders)	2013
"Animals"	Martin Garrix	Belgium (Wallonia)	2013
"Animals"	Martin Garrix	Scotland/UK	2013

== Borderline cases ==
Some recordings which include brief or non-musical use of the human voice are typically considered instrumentals. Examples include songs with the following:

- Short verbal interjections (as in "Tequila", "Topsy", "Wipe Out", "The Hustle", or "Bentley's Gonna Sort You Out")
- Repetitive nonsense words (e.g., "la la..." (as in "Calcutta") or "Woo Hoo")
- Non-musical spoken passages in the background of the track (e.g., "To Live Is to Die" by Metallica or "Wasteland" by Chelsea Grin)
- Wordless vocal effects, such as drones (e.g., "Rockit" or "Flying")
- Vocal percussion, such as beatbox B-sides on rap singles
- Yelling (e.g. "Cry for a Shadow")
- Yodeling (e.g., "Hocus Pocus")
- Whistling (e.g., "I Was Kaiser Bill's Batman" or "Colonel Bogey March")
- Spoken statements at the end of the track (e.g., "God Bless the Children of the Beast" by Mötley Crüe or "For the Love of God" by Steve Vai)
- Non-musical vocal recordings taken from other media (e.g., "Vampires" by Godsmack)
- Field recordings which may or may not contain non-lyrical words (e.g., many songs by Godspeed You! Black Emperor and other post-rock bands)

Songs including actual musical—rhythmic, melodic, and lyrical—vocals might still be categorized as instrumentals if the vocals appear only as a short part of an extended piece (e.g., "Unchained Melody" (Les Baxter), "Batman Theme", "TSOP (The Sound of Philadelphia)", "Pick Up the Pieces", "The Hustle", "Fly, Robin, Fly", "Get Up and Boogie", "Do It Any Way You Wanna", and "Gonna Fly Now"), though this definition is loose and subjective.

Falling just outside of that definition is "Theme from Shaft" by Isaac Hayes.

"Better Off Alone", which began as an instrumental by DJ Jurgen, had vocals by Judith Pronk, who would become a seminal part of Alice Deejay, added in later releases of the track.

== See also ==
- A cappella, vocal music or singing without instrumental accompaniment
- Backing track, a pre-recorded music that singers sing along to or a karaoke without vocals
- Beautiful music
- Easy listening
- Instrumental hip hop
- Instrumental rock
- Medley
- List of rock instrumentals
- Post-rock
- Smooth jazz
