= Richard Clayderman =

French pianist (born 1953)

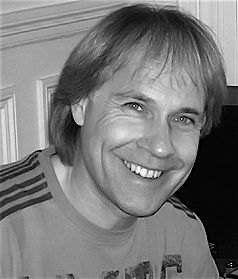
- Clayderman in 2006

Background information
- Born: Philippe Pagès; 28 December 1953 (age 72)
- Origin: Paris, France
- Genres: Easy listening Romantic
- Occupation: Pianist
- Instrument: Piano
- Years active: 1976–present
- Label: Delphine
- Website: richardclaydermanofficial.com

Richard Clayderman (French pronunciation: [ʁiʃaʁ kledɛʁman]; born Philippe Pagès French pronunciation: [filip paʒɛs], 28 December 1953 in Paris) is a French pianist who has released numerous albums including the compositions of Paul de Senneville, Olivier Toussaint and Marc Minier, instrumental renditions of popular music, rearrangements of movie soundtracks, ethnic music, and easy-listening arrangements of popular works of classical music.

== Early life ==
Clayderman learned piano from his father, an accordion teacher.

At the age of twelve, he was accepted into the Conservatoire de Paris, where he won great acclaim in his later adolescent years. Financial difficulties, precipitated by his father's illness, forestalled a promising career as a classical pianist. In order to earn a living, he found work as a bank clerk and as an accompanist to contemporary bands. He accompanied French singers such as Johnny Hallyday, Thierry Le Luron, and Michel Sardou.

== "Ballade pour Adeline" ==
In 1976, he was invited by Olivier Toussaint, a French record producer, and his partner Paul de Senneville, to record a gentle piano ballad. De Senneville had composed this ballad as a tribute to his baby daughter, Adeline. The 23-year-old Pagès was auditioned along with 20 other pianists and got the job. "He was an interesting musician with a soft touch and good technique", said Toussaint. "And he looked good, too."

His producers felt that his name would be difficult to pronounce in Spanish, German, etc. so they picked Clayderman on finding it was a great-grandmother's last name and invented the name Richard as they didn't like Philippe Clayderman. The single took off, selling 22 million copies in 38 countries. It was called "Ballade pour Adeline". This work was one of the most popular pieces in China, especially during the initial years of China's opening to the West, when it was ubiquitous and played in almost every hotel lobby in China, and it continues to be popular in China today.

== Success ==
Clayderman has recorded over 1,300 melodies and has created a new romantic style through a repertoire which combines his trademark originals with classics and pop standards. As of 2006, his record sales number at approximately 70 million, and has 267 gold and 70 platinum albums to his credit. He is popular in Asia and is noted by the Guinness Book of World Records as being "the most successful pianist in the world".

== Discography ==
=== Studio albums, 1977–2022 ===
- Richard Clayderman (aka Ballade pour Adeline, 1977)
- A Comme Amour/Les Fleurs Sauvages (1978)
- Rêveries (1979)
- Lettre à Ma Mère (1979)
- Medley Concerto (1979)
- Les Musiques de l’Amour (1980)
- Rondo Pour un Tout Petit Enfant (1981)
- Christmas (1982)
- Rêveries No. 2 (1982)
- Couleur Tendresse (1982)
- Les Rêves d'Amour (aka A Dream of Love, 1983)
- Le Premier Chagrin d’Elsa (1983)
- Italie Mon Amour (1984)
- The Music of Love (1984)
- Cœur fragile (1984)
- Concerto (with the Royal Philharmonic Orchestra, 1985)
- Divorce à Hollywood/Irreconcilable Differences (soundtrack, 1985)
- From Paris with Love (1985)
- Les Sonates (with Nicolas de Angelis, 1985)
- A Romantic Christmas (1985)
- Hollywood and Broadway (1986)
- Romantic (1986)
- Eléana (1987)
- Songs of Love (1987)
- A Little Night Music (1988)
- Deutsche Volkslieder (with the Schöneberger Sängerknaben, 1988)
- Quel Gran Genio Del Mio Amico – Richard Clayderman Interpreta Lucio Battisti (1988)
- Romantic America (1988)
- Zodiacal Symphony (1988)
- The Love Songs of Andrew Lloyd Webber (1989)
- Amour Pour Amour (with Berdien Stenberg, 1989)
- Il Y A Toujours du Soleil Au-Dessus des Nuages (with James Last, 1990)
- My Classic Collection (1990)
- The Fantastic Movie Story of Ennio Morricone (1990)
- Anemos (1990)
- Plays ABBA (1993)
- The Confluence (2003)
- Romantique (2013)
- Forever Love (2022)

=== Live albums ===
- En Concert (1981)
- A Pleyel (with Nicolas de Angelis, 1983)
- Brasil Tour ’86 (Brazil, 1986)
- Concert under the stars (Japan 1983)
