= Slow Knife =

2016 studio album by Kuedo

Studio album by Kuedo
- Released: 14 October 2016
- Genre: Electronic
- Length: 46:45
- Label: Planet Mu
- Producer: Kuedo

Kuedo chronology
Assertion of a Surrounding Presence (2015)	Slow Knife (2016)	Infinite Window (2022)

Slow Knife is the second studio album by English record producer Jamie Teasdale under the pseudonym Kuedo. It was released on 14 October 2016 through Planet Mu. It received generally favorable reviews from critics.

== Background ==
Jamie Teasdale, also known as Kuedo, is an English record producer. He is a member of Vex'd, along with Roly Porter. After releasing his debut solo album, Severant (2011), he released two EPs: Work, Live & Sleep in Collapsing Space (2012) and Assertion of a Surrounding Presence (2015).

Slow Knife is Teasdale's second solo album as Kuedo. The album's title track previously appeared on µ20 (2015), Planet Mu's 20th anniversary compilation. "In Your Sleep" features vocals from Wild Beasts' Hayden Thorpe. The album was released on 14 October 2016 through Planet Mu.

== Critical reception ==
Professional ratings
Aggregate scores
Source	Rating
Metacritic	80/100
Review scores
Source	Rating
Clash	6/10
Crack	7/10
PopMatters	8/10
Resident Advisor	3.6/5

According to the review aggregator Metacritic, Slow Knife received "generally favorable reviews" based on a weighted average score of 80 out of 100 from 5 critic scores.

Will Pritchard of Clash stated, "This is a record that appears more comfortable with its priorities fixed on a home listening experience." He added, "The industrial menace that defined Teasdale's earlier work — most notably as one half of Vex'd – appears to be almost entirely acid-washed out by this stage." Joseph Burnett of The Quietus wrote, "If Severant felt like a musical reflection of the teeming plazas from the anime version of Metropolis, Slow Knife is a walk through the perpetual rain in Blade Runner's Los Angeles." Angus Finlayson of Resident Advisor commented that "Slow Knife's best moments might even trump Severant." He added, "But Teasdale's efforts to escape the shadow of his debut sometimes lead him astray."

== Track listing ==
All tracks are written by Kuedo, except lyrics for "In Your Sleep" by Hayden Thorpe.

Slow Knife track listing
No.	Title	Length
1.	"Hourglass"	5:13
2.	"Under the Surface"	2:25
3.	"In Your Sleep"	4:28
4.	"Bending Moon"	2:10
5.	"Slow Knife"	3:54
6.	"Floating Forest"	3:36
7.	"Love Theme"	1:57
8.	"Approaching"	4:16
9.	"Broken Fox – Black Hole"	3:44
10.	"Breaking the Surface"	4:38
11.	"In Your Skin"	1:32
12.	"Warmer Light"	4:13
13.	"Halogen Light"	2:12
14.	"Lathe"	2:27
Total length:		46:45

Notes

- "Lathe" was inspired by the original piece "Lathe" by Arcane Device (David Lee Myers).

== Personnel ==
Credits adapted from liner notes.

- Kuedo – production
- Hayden Thorpe – vocals (3)
- Koenraad Ecker – cello (6, 9, 10), co-arrangement (6, 9, 10)
- Nigel Yang – co-production (12)
- Joji Kayama – photography
- Fabian Harb – sleeve
- Heavyweight – typeface
