= Paper Beast =

- Developer: Pixel Reef
- Publisher: Pixel Reef
- Director: Éric Chahi
- Composer: Roly Porter
- Engine: Unity
- Platforms: Microsoft Windows; PlayStation 4 PlayStation VR; PlayStation 5 PlayStation VR2
- Release: PS4 and PSVR; March 24, 2020; Windows; July 24, 2020; PS5 and PSVR2; September 27, 2023
- Genres: Adventure, puzzle
- Mode: Single-player

Paper Beast is a 2020 virtual reality adventure game developed and published by Pixel Reef for PlayStation 4, Windows, and PlayStation 5. The game was created by Éric Chahi, who previously worked on Another World. In the game, players are tasked to navigate a world inhabited by various digital life-forms. It received generally positive reviews upon release. Paper Beast: Folded Edition, a non-VR version of the game, was released on October 20, 2020.

== Gameplay ==
Paper Beast is an adventure game played from a first-person perspective. In the game, players explore a large ecosystem composed of various digital life-forms originating from lost internet codes and algorithms deep inside the internet. In the adventure mode, the player assumes control of the first explorer and must navigate the world through manipulating the environment and interacting with the wildlife. Players are tasked to rescue them from dangers and predators, assist them in various ways, and use their abilities in order to progress in the game. The artificial intelligence, which governs the behaviors of these animals, will react to the player's actions accordingly. Each species in the game also behaves differently and they have their own unique goals. The player can also modify the terrain so as to overcome environmental obstacles.

The game also features a sandbox mode, which has elements of a god game. This mode allows players to experiment with different actions, such as modifying the terrain by adding water, rocks, and sand, changing the weather, and growing vegetation. The game's physics system and AI will respond to these decisions, allowing players to observe the impacts of these actions. Animals also interact with each other in the world, and their interactions will also modify the terrain and leave behind imprints. Players can also add items into the world to further disrupt the ecosystem. For instance, players can use an anti-gravity capsule to levitate the animals near it.

== Development ==
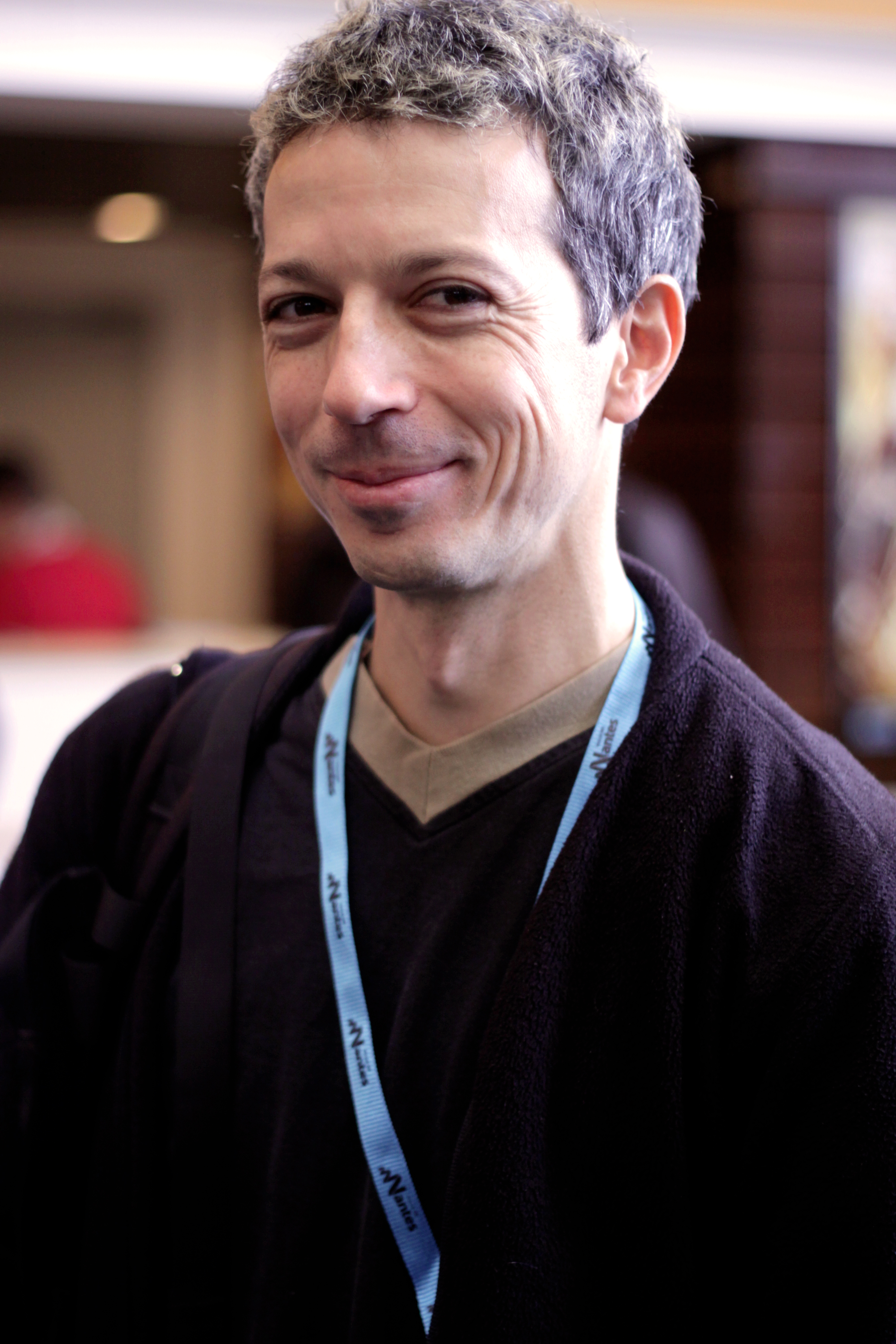
Éric Chahi, the game's creative director

The game was directed by Éric Chahi, who previously worked as the creator for Another World. After working on From Dust (2011), Chahi went to work with a volcano museum on Reunion Island to create a virtual simulation for the island's Piton de la Fournaise. When the project was completed, Chahi developed ideas around the volcano work for a virtual reality game, where the landscape and creatures within it, represented by origami-like forms purported created out of the landscape of Big Data, with procedural behavior. The creatures in the game have an origami-like form as the team felt that they fit naturally with VR's "low-poly designs". Chahi founded Pixel Reefs in 2016 and started the game's production with four people. The development for Paper Beast lasted for approximately four years, and as of 2019, the team was composed of a total of 16 members.

Like Another World, the story was conveyed to the players non-verbally, and it relied entirely on players' interaction with the wildlife. According to Chahi, this approach "empowers the players’ imagination and can impact their emotions more directly". Chahi added that the game was "poetic", and that the game world was created to showcase the "miracles of life". While the game utilizes Unity, the team created its own engine to make the game compatible with VR systems. The team also used the engine to create its game physics. Japanese punk rock band TsuShiMaMiRe and Roly Porter were the composers for the game's original soundtrack. The audio team, which included 3 full-time staff, recorded sounds inspired by "papers, cardboard, adhesive tape, wifi waves, radio noises and natural tones" to create audio that is both "natural" and "artificial" at the same time.

Announced on April 10, 2019, it was released for PlayStation VR on March 24, 2020. The game was also released for HTC Vive, Oculus Rift, Oculus Rift S, and Valve Index in July 2020. Compared to the PSVR version, the PC version was released with improved visuals, a continuous movement option and a new species for the sandbox mode. Pixel Reef released the Folded Edition, which allows players to play the game without using any VR headset, on October 20, 2020. The game was made available for Amazon Luna on December 3, 2020.

=== Paper Beast Enhanced Edition ===
An enhanced edition of the game was released on September 27, 2023 for PlayStation 5 and PlayStation VR2. It contains support for a 4K resolution, improved textures and shadows, and an expanded sandbox.

== Reception ==
Reception

Aggregate scores
Aggregator	Score
Metacritic	PS4: 79/100
OpenCritic	82% recommend

Review scores
Publication	Score
Edge	8/10
Jeuxvideo.com	14/20
PlayStation Official Magazine – UK	8/10
PC Gamer (US)	70/100

Paper Beast received generally positive reviews upon release. Christian Donlan from Eurogamer described it as "a transformative VR odyssey", praising the game's world and the wildlife. Rick Lane from PC Gamer described the game as a unique experience but felt that the adventure mode was "constrained by the physical limits of its vignettes".

During the 24th Annual D.I.C.E. Awards, the Academy of Interactive Arts & Sciences nominated Paper Beast for "Immersive Reality Game of the Year" and "Immersive Reality Technical Achievement".
