= First law (disambiguation) =

"First Law" is a science fiction story by Isaac Asimov.

First law may also refer to:

- Newton's first law of motion
- First law of thermodynamics
- First law of crystallography
- Mendel's first law of segregation
- Tikanga Māori, the law of the Maori

== See also ==
- Second law (disambiguation)
- Third law (disambiguation)
- The First Law, a fantasy series by Joe Abercrombie
- The First Law (film), a 1918 silent film
- Three Laws of Robotics
