= Work, Live & Sleep in Collapsing Space =

EP by Kuedo
- Released: 25 June 2012
- Length: 17:02
- Label: Planet Mu
- Producer: Jamie Teasdale

Kuedo chronology
Severant (2011)	Work, Live & Sleep in Collapsing Space (2012)	Assertion of a Surrounding Presence (2015)

Work, Live & Sleep in Collapsing Space is an EP by English record producer Jamie Teasdale under the pseudonym Kuedo. It was released on 25 June 2012 through Planet Mu.

== Background ==
Jamie Teasdale, also known as Kuedo, is an English record producer. He is a member of Vex'd, along with Roly Porter. Work, Live & Sleep in Collapsing Space is a follow-up to his solo debut album, Severant (2011). The title track was recorded during the Severant sessions. The EP includes remixes by Laurel Halo and Claude Speeed. The latter's remix features Jivraj Singh on drums.

The EP was released on 25 June 2012 through Planet Mu.

== Critical reception ==
Professional ratings
Review scores
Source	Rating
Drowned in Sound	8/10
Resident Advisor	4.0/5
XLR8R	7.5/10

Piers Martin of The Guardian wrote, "If last year's Severant album was Kuedo's sprawling love letter to Vangelis and his Blade Runner score, this elegant synth jam finds him breaking into John Carpenter's house and standing there, salivating." Jordan Rothlein of Resident Advisor stated, "All told, it's quite an atypical package, light on club fodder but stuffed with big sounds you'll want to hear nice and loud." George Bass of Drowned in Sound commented that "This sequel is no disappointment and shows Teasdale is capable of presenting a future where machines show as much hope as we do."

== Track listing ==
All tracks are written by Jamie Teasdale.

Work, Live & Sleep in Collapsing Space track listing
No.	Title	Length
1.	"Work, Live & Sleep in Collapsing Space"	4:33
2.	"Work, Live & Sleep in Collapsing Space" (Laurel Halo remix)	4:32
3.	"Work, Live & Sleep in Collapsing Space" (Claude Speeed 'Infinity Ultra Rework' featuring Jivraj Singh)	7:56
Total length:		17:02

== Personnel ==
Credits adapted from liner notes.

- Jamie Teasdale – production
- Laurel Halo – remix (2), additional production (2)
- Claude Speeed – remix (3), additional production (3)
- Jivraj Singh – drums (3)

== Charts ==
Chart performance for Work, Live & Sleep in Collapsing Space
Chart (2012)	Peak position
UK Physical Singles (Official Charts)	87
