= The Beach House (2019 film) =

- Promotional release poster
- Directed by: Jeffrey A. Brown
- Written by: Jeffrey A. Brown
- Produced by: Andrew D. Corkin; Tyler Davidson; Sophia Lin
- Starring: Liana Liberato; Noah Le Gros; Maryann Nagel; Jake Weber
- Cinematography: Owen Levelle
- Edited by: Aaron Crozier
- Music by: Roly Porter
- Production companies: Low Spark Films; Uncorked Productions
- Distributed by: Shudder
- Release dates: September 14, 2019 (SEFFF); July 9, 2020 (United States)
- Running time: 88 minutes
- Country: United States
- Language: English

The Beach House is a 2019 American horror film written and directed by Jeffrey A. Brown in his feature directorial debut. It stars Liana Liberato and Noah Le Gros a couple who take a vacation to a beach house, where they meet an older couple (Maryann Nagel and Jake Weber) and are threatened by a mysterious infection that spreads across the coast.

The Beach House had its world premiere at the Strasbourg European Fantastic Film Festival in September 2019. The film was made available for streaming on Shudder on July 9, 2020.

== Plot ==
Emily and Randall arrive at Randall's parents' beach house in a remote vacation town. Upon their arrival, they are pleased to see that the town looks deserted. When they enter the house, Emily and Randall go upstairs and have sex and then have a small disagreement. They soon learn that another couple is already staying at the beach house—Mitch and Jane Turner, old friends of Randall's father. Jane is terminally ill, and Mitch hopes to give her one last happy vacation. Because the house has plenty of room, both couples decide to stay.

They eat dinner together, and Randall eats a local oyster, while Emily refuses. Afterward, Randall suggests they all share some edible marijuana which he brought with him, to which Jane and Mitch agree. While high, Mitch notices the strange water texture, and they all see glowing microbes covering the beach and trees. Jane leaves to see it up close but starts coughing after a while and gets disoriented when a strong fog starts to form around the area. After breathing in the fog, Emily becomes disoriented as well and passes out. She awakens to a sick Jane throwing up and goes to sleep. When she wakes up the next day, she finds a catatonic Jane sitting in the kitchen, covered in skin lesions, and Mitch missing.

Randall and Emily decide to go to the beach, which they are surprised to find is completely empty. After a while, Randall gets sick to his stomach and rushes back to the house. In the bathroom, he sees the water from the sink forming strange patterns; then, hearing Jane moan, he goes to help her. On the beach, Mitch suddenly appears. He muses that something about the area feels off, then tells Emily he is going for a swim; instead, he drowns himself. Panicked Emily steps on a washed up Portuguese man o' war. It stings her and Emily sees a worm-like creature crawling in an open wound. She manages to crawl up to the house and remove the worm. She finds a sickened Randall being pursued by Jane, who has milky white eyes and strange fluid leaking from her mouth. Managing to lock Jane in the house, Randall and Emily escape into the slowly thickening fog.

By nightfall, the fog covers the area and Randall has become even sicker. Emily discovers a police car with a radio inside, and she manages to contact someone. The person on the other end asks if "they have been exposed" and tells them to barricade themselves and to not breathe in the fog. They break into a house for shelter. They find that the water is now a completely different texture. When Emily turns on the TV she finds an Emergency Alert System on every channel and a radio broadcast reveals that the microbes, which were preserved in underwater rocks, had been released by global warming and are fatal to all forms of complex life. Emily suggests they wait until morning, but Randall is scared of dying. Emily goes into the basement, finds oxygen tanks for scuba diving, and concludes they can use them to breathe in safe air. She also discovers a horribly mutated person feeding on a corpse.

Upstairs, Randall vomits a squid-like creature before his eyes also turn white as he succumbs to the infection. Emily returns with the scuba gear and discovers Randall, striking him in the head with a scuba tank when he tries to attack her. Finding the keys to a car, she drives away but becomes disoriented in the fog and crashes into a tree. She stumbles from the car into a tide pool and lies there, breathing in the fog and hallucinating about the microbes in the water. The next morning, she lies on the beach, telling herself not to be scared as the infection completes its course. A wave engulfs her body, dragging her out to sea.

== Cast ==
- Liana Liberato as Emily
- Noah Le Gros as Randall
- Maryann Nagel as Jane
- Jake Weber as Mitch

== Music ==
The film's score was composed by British electronic musician Roly Porter. Known for his work with the influential dubsteb duo Vex'd and his unique approach to electronic music, Porter was invited onto the production by the filmmakers due to his fascination with space, science fiction and his atmospheric solo albums.

== Release ==
The Beach House had its world premiere at the Strasbourg European Fantastic Film Festival on September 14, 2019. In October 2019, the film was screened at the Sitges Film Festival. That same month, Shudder acquired the distribution rights to the film.

The film was made available for streaming on Shudder in the United States, Canada, the United Kingdom and Ireland on July 9, 2020.

== Reception ==
On review aggregator website Rotten Tomatoes, the film holds an approval rating of 81% based on 109 reviews, with an average rating of 6.5/10. The site's critics consensus reads: "An intriguing and unsettling debut for writer-director Jeffrey A. Brown, The Beach House offers a delightfully grim getaway for fans of imaginative, ambitious horror." On Metacritic, the film has a weighted average score of 64 out of 100, based on 13 critics, indicating "generally favorable reviews".

Elisabeth Vincentelli of The New York Times wrote that, "after a dillydallying slow start, Brown ratchets up the tension efficiently, summoning a mix of gross-out body invasion, eco-mutation and large-scale cosmic dread on a small budget." Brian Tallerico of RogerEbert.com gave the film three out of four stars, writing: "Boasting sweaty, shaky camerawork and a firm grasp on tone, Brown's grisly indie horror flick is yet another piece of work that feels unexpectedly suited to our times." Daniel Kurland of Bloody Disgusting gave the film a mostly positive review, calling it "a powerful, emotional throwback to '50s sci-fi" and "an atmospheric triumph from newcomer director Jeffrey A. Brown. He crafts a slick tale of invasion and destruction that's both intimate and cosmically grand."

Michael Gingold of Rue Morgue wrote that, "With a modest budget and scope, Brown nonetheless elicits a sense of engulfing biological apocalypse". Variety's Dennis Harvey commended the film for its tone and "generally strong performances", calling it "skillful enough to satisfy most viewers, if not quite sufficiently original in concept or striking in execution to leave a lasting imprint." Henry Stewart of Slant Magazine gave the film two out of four stars, criticizing its characterization: "The character drama becomes afterthought as it's superseded by action."
