= Heart of the Alien =

1994 video game

- Developer: Interplay Productions
- Publisher: Virgin Interactive Entertainment
- Director: Jeremy S. Barnes
- Designers: Jeremy S. Barnes; Michael Burton; Doug Nonast
- Platform: Sega CD
- Release: NA: July 1994
- Genre: Platform
- Mode: Single-player

Heart of the Alien is a cinematic platform game developed by Interplay Productions and was released by Virgin Interactive Entertainment in 1994 for the Sega CD exclusively in North America. It is a sequel to Another World and continues the story directly from where the original ended. The game switches the player's role from Another World; this time the player takes control of Buddy, the main character's alien ally from the previous game.

== Gameplay ==
The game's control scheme is largely similar to that of its predecessor Another World, though there are several new elements related to the character's powerful energized whip. For example, Buddy can swing from stalactites or similar objects and his shields are deployed instantly, unlike Lester's, which take a few seconds to charge. As in Another World, there is no heads-up display.

== Plot ==
The story picks up immediately after the end of Another World. Buddy lands the flying creature in the ruins of his village, lays Lester down on a cot to rest and walks through the village, thinking of his past. A flashback follows showing that Buddy's people were captured by soldiers led by one of the alien humanoids with red eyes. After recovering his power whip, Buddy returns to the prison from which he and Lester escaped in the first game trying to save his people.

Buddy and Lester overcome various obstacles, but later in the game Buddy is knocked unconscious, and Lester saves him by attacking an enemy alien, but is electrocuted while doing so. Eventually Buddy is able to find the red-eyed alien and traps him in a cage with a beast that kills him. At the end of the game, Buddy gives Lester's body a ceremonial cremation. It is shown later how Buddy's village is rebuilt with its citizens living again in harmony.

== Development ==
Eric Chahi recalled: "Interplay insisted in making the sequel in order to make the most of the CD-ROM medium's capabilities. After discussion, I agreed. Rather than making a chronological development related to the first story, I decided that redesigning the game from the alien point of view was excellent, and would make the player discover Another World with other eyes. I could already picture scenes where Lester would be in the background fighting guards, while the player would control the alien in the foreground and then join our first hero, help him, etc... The concept was good but, alas, neither the animations nor the game, entirely developed by Interplay, were up to the job. It was a flop." Reportedly, "quickly after it was released, Chahi made a public statement that the title did not represent his vision of the world he crafted and disowned it altogether from being treated as an official sequel."

== Reception ==
GamePro hailed the game as even better than the original Out of This World, praising its sharply animated cutscenes, ingenious level design, evocative soundtrack, and the inclusion of the original game on the disc. They acknowledged that the controls are sometimes frustrating, but felt that practice and patience would inevitably overcome this issue. The four reviewers of Electronic Gaming Monthly likewise found it to be a strong sequel despite the control difficulties. They commented that the graphics suit the game's theme, the puzzle-like challenges are engaging, and the game's cinematic sequences and animations are outstanding. Sebastian Sponsel of Sega-16 gave the game an 8/10 rating and, while criticizing its relentless difficulty and controls, called the game an "enjoyable experience [and] a true sequel to a classic".
