= Severant =

Studio album by Kuedo
- Released: 17 October 2011
- Genre: Electronic
- Length: 45:56
- Label: Planet Mu
- Producer: Kuedo

Kuedo chronology
Videowave (2011)	Severant (2011)	Work, Live & Sleep in Collapsing Space (2012)

Severant is the debut studio album by English record producer Jamie Teasdale under the pseudonym Kuedo. It was released on 17 October 2011 through Planet Mu. It received universal acclaim from critics.

== Background ==
Jamie Teasdale, also known as Kuedo, is an English record producer. He is a member of Vex'd, along with Roly Porter. Severant is his debut studio album as Kuedo. It was released on 17 October 2011 through Planet Mu.

In 2022, the album was reissued as a double vinyl edition, with "Work, Live & Sleep in Collapsing Space" being added as a bonus track. The album's cover art was redesigned by Raf Rennie.

== Critical reception ==
Professional ratings
Aggregate scores
Source	Rating
Metacritic	83/100
Review scores
Source	Rating
AllMusic	3.5/5 stars
Drowned in Sound	9/10
Fact	4.5/5
musicOMH	4/5 stars
NME	8/10
Pitchfork	7.7/10
Resident Advisor	4/5
Sputnikmusic	4/5
State	4/5 stars
XLR8R	8.5/10

According to the review aggregator Metacritic, Severant received "universal acclaim" based on a weighted average score of 83 out of 100 from 13 critic scores.

Andrew Ryce of Resident Advisor stated, "While it shares the synth preoccupation of previous Kuedo material, Severant owes nothing to dubstep, instead modeling itself after '80s synth music." Patric Fallon of XLR8R called the album "a massive step away from Teasdale's past output" and "one that is confidently sure-footed." Jon O'Brien of AllMusic stated, "An intriguing sonic experience from start to finish, Severant is a bold left-field first offering from an artist who's quickly establishing himself as the intelligent dance scene's 'one to watch.'" Joe Colly of Pitchfork commented that Severant "brings together expressive synth work and cinematic sweep with a degree of nuance and, well, prettiness that's frankly kind of surprising."

=== Accolades ===
Year-end lists for Severant
Publication	List	Rank	Ref.
Fact	The 50 Best Albums of 2011	16	
Resident Advisor	Top 20 Albums of 2011	8	
The Wire	Top 50 Releases of 2011	41	
XLR8R	Best Releases of 2011	11	

== Track listing ==
All tracks are written by Kuedo.

Severant track listing
No.	Title	Length
1.	"Visioning Shared Tomorrows"	2:02
2.	"Ant City"	3:23
3.	"Whisper Fate"	2:45
4.	"Onset (Escapism)"	3:02
5.	"Scissors"	3:33
6.	"Truth Flood"	3:41
7.	"Reality Drift"	2:17
8.	"Ascension Phase"	2:50
9.	"Salt Lake Cuts"	5:12
10.	"Seeing the Edges"	3:37
11.	"Flight Path"	4:45
12.	"Shutter Light Girl"	1:07
13.	"Vectoral"	3:04
14.	"As We Lie Promising"	0:56
15.	"Memory Rain"	3:42
Total length:		45:56

== Personnel ==
Credits adapted from liner notes.

- Kuedo – production, performance
- Sam Chirnside – design
- Anna Higgie – artwork

== Charts ==
Chart performance for Severant
Chart (2011)	Peak position
UK Dance Albums (Official Charts)	30
