= Another World (video game) =

Action-adventure video game

- Cover art by Éric Chahi
- Developers: Delphine Software; Interplay (console); The Removers (Jaguar)
- Publishers: Delphine Software; U.S. Gold; Interplay; Virgin Games (Genesis); The Digital Lounge (15th Anniversary); Focus Entertainment (20th Anniversary); Headup Games (20th Anniversary); Retro-Gaming Connexion (Jaguar)
- Designer: Éric Chahi
- Programmer: Éric Chahi
- Composer: Jean-François Freitas
- Platform: Amiga, Atari ST: 3DO Interactive Multiplayer, Apple IIGS, Jaguar, Mac OS, MS-DOS, Game Boy Advance, Sega CD, Genesis, Super NES, TI-84 Plus CE 20th Anniversary iOS, Linux, Android, Windows, 3DS, OS X, PlayStation 3, PlayStation 4, PlayStation Vita, Symbian, Wii U, Windows Mobile, Xbox One, Switch
- Release: November 1991: Amiga, Atari ST November 1991 IIGS, MS-DOS, SNES 1992 Genesis; NA: March 1993; EU: May 1993 3DO 1994 Mobile phone 2005 Windows Mobile 2006 Windows (15th Anniversary) 2006 iOS; NA: September 22, 2011 Android March 2012 Windows, OS X (20th Anniversary) April 4, 2013 Jaguar; WW: December 2013 Nintendo 3DS, Wii U June 19, 2014 PlayStation 3, PlayStation 4, PlayStation Vita, Xbox One June 25, 2014 Switch; WW: July 9, 2018
- Genres: Action, platform
- Mode: Single-player

Another World (Note: Known in North America as Out of This World and in Japan as Outer World (アウターワールド)) is a cinematic platform action-adventure game designed by Éric Chahi and published by Delphine Software in November 1991. In North America it was published as Out of This World. The game tells the story of Lester, a young scientist who, as a result of an experiment gone wrong, finds himself on a dangerous alien world where he is forced to fight for his survival.

Another World was developed by Chahi alone over a period of about two years, with help with the soundtrack from Jean-François Freitas. Chahi developed his own game engine, creating all the game's art and animations in vector form to reduce memory use, with some use of rotoscoping to help plan out character movements. Both narratively and gameplay-wise, he wanted the game to be told with little to no language or user-interface elements. The game was originally developed for the Amiga and Atari ST but has since been widely ported to other contemporary systems, including home and portable consoles and mobile devices. Chahi has since overseen release of various anniversary releases of the game.

Another World was innovative in its use of cinematic effects in both real-time and cutscenes, which earned the game praise among critics and commercial success. It also influenced a number of other video games and designers, inspiring such titles as Ico, Metal Gear Solid, Silent Hill, and Delphine's later Flashback. It is now considered among the best video games ever made.

== Gameplay ==
The first level of the Sega Genesis version, with Lester climbing out of the pond into which he has been teleported

Another World is a platform game, featuring a control scheme where the player uses either the keyboard, joystick or gamepad to make the protagonist run, jump, attack and perform other, situation-specific actions, such as rocking a cage back and forth. In the initial part of the game, the player's character Lester is unarmed. He is able to kick at small creatures, but is otherwise defenseless.

Later in the game, the player acquires a laser pistol from a fallen foe. The pistol has three capabilities: a standard fire mode, the ability to create force fields to block enemy fire, and a powerful charged shot that can break through force fields and some walls. Enemies also have the same capabilities, requiring the player to take advantage of the three gun modes and the environment to overcome them.

Lester and his alien ally cannot sustain any damage, and the game ends immediately if either of them is struck by a projectile or comes in contact with an animal or an environmental hazard. However, the game uses numerous checkpoints enabling the player to keep restarting at the last point indefinitely. On the Amiga and older consoles without the ability to save a game, the player can write down an alphanumeric code for these checkpoints and re-enter it when restarting the game later. In any given scene, the game provides no clues as to what the player should do next, features no HUD except for an oxygen bar during the swimming sequences, and no on-screen text; and the characters the player meets speak in an unintelligible alien language.

== Plot ==
The protagonist of the game is Lester Knight Chaykin, a young physicist. In the opening cinematic, Lester arrives at his high-tech underground laboratory in his black Ferrari during a thunderstorm and goes to work on his experiment using a particle accelerator, attempting to reconstruct what happened when the universe was born. Immediately before the particles reach their intended destination, a lightning bolt strikes the laboratory and interferes with the accelerator, causing an unforeseen particle fusion and an explosion, opening a hole in time and space and teleporting Lester to a barren, alien planet.

After evading a number of dangerous indigenous animals, Lester is captured by a race of humanoid aliens and taken to a subterranean prison camp. Lester escapes along with an alien captive known as "Buddy" and the two must evade capture while travelling through a series of dangerous environments, battling alien soldiers and wild creatures while solving numerous puzzles in order to survive. The duo traverse the prison complex, a cave system and a tower structure. In the game's climax, Lester is severely wounded by one of the aliens, but with the help of his alien friend, manages to kill his attacker and escape. After reaching the top of the tower, Lester collapses, but is promptly joined by Buddy, who picks Lester up and the two escape on a dragon-like creature, flying off to the horizon.

== Development ==
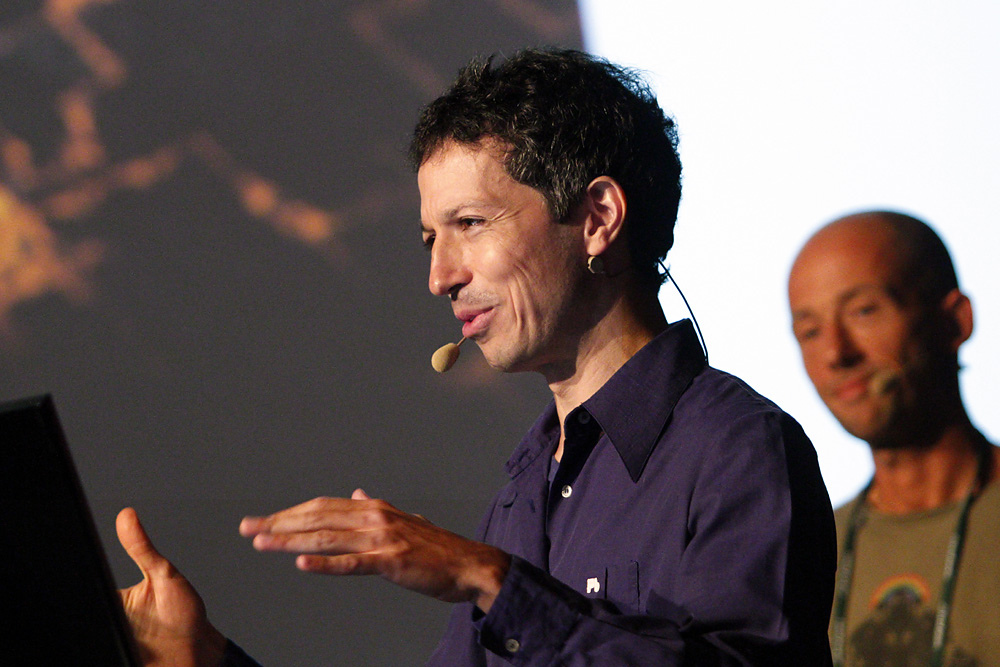
Éric Chahi, the creator of Another World, at the 2010 Game Developers Conference

The game's French designer Éric Chahi had previously worked as a game programmer and then as a graphic designer for video games since 1983. It was the success of his earlier work with Paul Cuisset as a graphic designer for the adventure game Future Wars for Delphine Software and its royalties that gave him the chance to develop Another World "without any constraint of any sort or any editorial pressure." After Future Wars was released in 1989, Chahi had the choice either to work on Cuisset's next game, Operation Stealth, or create his own game. As "there had been many books and tools released to develop easily on the Amiga at that time," Chahi felt confident that he could go back to programming.

The game was influenced by works that Chahi liked at the time. The art and atmosphere were influenced by science fiction books such as Dune, artists such as Michael Whelan, and comic illustrators such as Richard Corben. Manga such as Akira Toriyama's Dragon Ball influenced the way it suggests a lot with very little, character blurring effects such as the use of thin lines to suggest fast motion, and charging power attacks influenced by the Kamehameha. The game's art style and atmosphere also drew influence from science fiction or fantasy art, including artists such as Frank Frazetta, Bernie Wrightson, and Zdzisław Beksiński, as well as the novel Hyperion. The laser blasters were also influenced by Star Wars.

In August 1989, Chahi was impressed by the flat-color animations that the Amiga version of Dragon's Lair had and thought that it would be possible to use vector outlines to create a similar effect using much less computer storage. After first attempting to write the graphical routines in C, he turned to assembly language. He wrote a polygon routine for the Motorola 68000 on an Atari ST to test his theory, with much success. Later, he found that he could run the code on the Amiga platform and achieve a frame rate of about 20 frames per second, later recognizing this as "a major turning point in the creation of the game" and the point where he knew the polygon approach would work. He was able to take advantage of the Amiga's genlock capabilities to create rotoscoped animations with the polygons, using video recordings of himself performing various actions. Though he had tried to use smaller polygons (which Chahi called "pixigons") to construct the backgrounds for the scenes based on Deluxe Paint artwork, the process of creating them was excruciatingly slow, and he returned to using bitmapped images.

Another World was influenced by everything I liked at that time of my life — mainly by pictorial art, movies and science fiction books, like Dune or Hyperion. Comics and fantasy art also inspired me; artists like Michael Whelan, Richard Corben, Frank Miller and Frank Frazetta.

— Éric Chahi

While Chahi had a clear idea of how to implement his game engine, he mostly improvised when creating the actual content of the game, allowing the game to develop "layer by layer without knowing where it was going." He planned on creating a science fiction game that was similar to Karateka and Impossible Mission. Because he wanted to create a dramatic, cinematic experience, the game features no HUD or dialog, giving the player only a representation of the surrounding game world during both gameplay elements and the cutscenes progressing the story. However, with no idea of the technical limitations he would face while building out the story, he focused more on creating ambiance, rhythmic pacing, and narrative tension to the game. Chahi resorted to developing his own tool with a new programming language through GFA BASIC coupled with the game's engine in Devpac assembler, to control and animate the game, interpreted in real-time by the game engine, effectively creating his own animation sequencer.

With the creation of the tools needed for building out the rest of the game by December 1989, Chahi began working on the introductory sequence as a means to validate the full capacities of his engine. The introduction sequence also gave Chahi the chance to explore the types of cinematics he could create through the engine. Chahi later considered this the "first step in the improvisation process" that he used throughout the rest of development. He finished the game's introduction sequence in early 1990 and started working on the first level. Chahi worked at the game at a linear pace, developing each section of the game in chronological order and influenced by his own personal feelings and attitude at the time. For example, as Chahi recognized he was trying to create a game on his own, the first portions of the game evoke loneliness and isolation, reflecting Chahi's mood at the time. He did not have the original intention of the character meeting an ally, but again described the improvisation approach led him to include the alien friend, and had included specific cinematics that showed a close up of the alien to help the player imagine this world.

Later in the game's development, Chahi added laser pistols, including the one that Lester carries for several effects. The idea was influenced by the Star Wars blasters, but added depth to the gameplay by giving the player more options. He also found that repeated laser fire by the enemies helped to enunciate the rhythm of the game. Chahi would later add in the plasma ball that increased the available strategy to players. Several points in the game use elevators or teleporters to move Lester between levels; Chahi had used these instead of stairways, as it was difficult to produce proper animation for these.

After 17 months of development, Chahi was only about one-third finished with the game, and realized that this rate would have been impractical. He began to take steps to simplify the development, including reusing background graphics and creating building blocks that allowed him to focus more on the game's puzzles. At the same time, he began to seek a publisher for the game. He first spoke to his former employer, Delphine Software, but also sought other distributors. One, Virgin, was favourable to Chahi's game but had suggested that he change it to a point-and-click style adventure game. Chahi had considered changing the game in line with this request but realized "the effort to do this would have been too huge, and some friends who played the game loved it." Ultimately, he accepted Delphine's offer in June 1991, and set a tentative release date in November. To meet this deadline, Chahi used storyboards to sketch out the rest of the game's plot, balancing the overall pacing of the game. One ending captured on these storyboards, but abandoned, was Lester becoming the leader of the alien world. Chahi also argued for his own cover art for the game even with the time crunch for release; he had been disappointed in cover art that was foisted on his games by previous publishers and insisted he be allowed to create it for this game. The game was finished in 1991, which inspired the game's tagline: "It took six days to create the Earth. Another World took two years"; Chahi noted his own exhaustion at completing this project is mirrored in the near-death of Lester at the end of the game.

Upon publishing, Delphine did not perform a playtest of the full game, only having previously tested the first portion of the game. Delphine's U.S. publisher Interplay undertook a full playtest and Chahi fixed a number of bugs that arose from this. Interplay had also requested additional changes in the game, including making the game longer and changing the game's introduction music. Chahi was adamant about retaining the game's opening music, and had attempted to change Interplay's minds by sending them an "infinite fax", a looped piece of paper, with the message "keep the original intro music" on it. Only when Delphine's lawyer got involved and told Interplay they legally could not change the music did Interplay relax this requirement.

== Soundtrack ==
The game's music was composed by Jean-François Freitas. The music was influenced by film soundtracks such as Back to the Future. Black Screen Records released CD and vinyl versions of the 18-song soundtrack in August 2017.

== Release ==
Screenshot of the introduction cutscene to the final level from the original Amiga version. Nintendo of America requested that all scenes that feature blood, or any blood-like thing, such as the venus flytrap saliva, as well as this brief nudity scene, be redrawn, and so "crack of the naked aliens' bottoms was reduced by 3 pixels."

The game was originally released for the Amiga and Atari ST in November 1991, running at a display resolution of 320×200 pixels. These versions received less play-testing than other versions, making for a less-fluid game, but the Amiga's sound capabilities afford it a high sound quality compared to contemporary ports. The game released on the Atari ST is identical, but with a less refined sound, and its colors are less sharp than on Amiga. These versions had code wheel protection that made it difficult to use unauthorized copies, forcing the player to enter a code (series of figures) looked up from a code wheel that came with the game. The player had to turn the wheel according to the number that was requested in the screen whenever the game is loaded in order to reload the game. Another small change between the Amiga and ST versions and the others was that Lester would yell as he grabs the vine in the first area if he was not being chased by the beast in these versions; this feature was omitted from most other versions.

The game was published in North America under the title Out of This World in order to avoid confusion with the popular but unrelated soap opera television series Another World. Coincidentally, the science fiction sitcom Out of This World aired at the same time as the game's USA-Canada release.

=== Ports ===
Many reviewers criticized the short length of the game. Chahi, working for 16 hours a day for two months, responded by creating a new level just before the amphitheatre scene, when the alien friend rescues Lester at the end of a long dead-end corridor. Chahi said: "I like this extra level a lot because it reinforces the close relationship between the hero and the alien by developing their mutual aid." He also added more dangers and more save points. This ended up being the 1992 MS-DOS version, which was coded by Daniel Morais. The Classic Mac OS version has higher resolution, but is otherwise identical.

Through Interplay Entertainment, conversions were released for the Super NES and Apple IIGS in 1992, and then for the Mega Drive/Genesis in 1993. The Super NES, 3DO and IIGS have a prologue before the introduction begins, which consists of an entry that comes from Lester's diary. The Mega Drive prologue is different from the other versions. The Sega CD version of Another World combines the original game (with CD-quality new music by Freitas) with the sequel, Heart of the Alien, and was released exclusively in North America as Heart of the Alien: Out of This World Parts I and II.

All of the console versions include some form of dynamic musical score during gameplay, and in the case of the Mega Drive conversion, use arrangements of the music originating in the Super NES and Apple IIGS versions. This differs from other versions which only have music for the opening and ending segments. Interplay wanted to add additional tunes by Charles Deenen. They also wanted to exchange Jean-François Freitas's music for a different soundtrack, but Chahi did not agree to the change and Delphine's lawyer helped to keep the original intro music. The Apple IIGS and Super NES versions were programmed by Rebecca Heineman, who said: "Since Interplay wouldn't pay for a Super FX chip, I found a way to do it with static RAM on the cart and DMA which got me a great frame rate. Interplay wouldn't pay for the static RAM either, so I ended up using Fast ROM and a MVN instruction. Interplay wouldn't pay for a 3.6 MHz ROM either. So, frustrated, I shoved my block move code into the DMA registers and use it as RAM running at 3.6 MHz. It worked. I got fast block moves on slow cartridges and made a game using polygons working on a 65816 with pure software rendering." Another World is the only game directly ported from the Super NES to the Apple IIGS, which has the same 65C816 microprocessor.

The 3DO port was developed by Interplay in 1993, and has detailed raster graphics backgrounds. Chahi believes this detracts from the game, because it is incongruous with the game graphics and looks flat. The original backgrounds were extracted, then sent to an animation studio to be recreated. The new painted backgrounds were then scanned and implemented. The game's soundtrack was changed again, albeit without any legal troubles, due to Chahi's focus on a new project. Some new tunes were also added, all played from the disc, such as when Lester escapes the big pool in the first level and when he is grabbed by the guard that appears at the end. At the ending, there is a fragment of the introduction of the sequel, Heart of the Alien. Also included in some versions of this 3DO release is a separate minigame "Stalactites", in which the player pushes up stalactite shapes falling from the top of the screen. This version also includes an Easter egg animation of Rebecca Heineman getting her head chopped off.

Chahi acquired the rights to Another World's intellectual property from Delphine Software International after they closed down in July 2004. Magic Productions then offered to port the game to mobile phones, and it was ported with help from Cyril Cogordan. Chahi saw that the game's playability could be improved, so he used his old Amiga for reprogramming certain parts of the script and made the graphics' shading clearer in order to counter mobile phones' low resolutions. In July 2005, almost a decade and a half after it was first released on the Amiga, the game was released for mobile phone handsets using the Symbian operating system, thanks to Telcogames and developer Magic Productions. In 2006, Magic Productions also released a remastered Pocket PC version for Windows Mobile 5.0 OS or later in QVGA (320×240 resolution). Telcogames entered administration in 2008, closing the Magic Productions studio. The administrator's letter to stakeholders mentions that its assets will be sold, but does not indicate to whom or mention Another World assets by name.

A Jaguar port of Another World was originally in development and planned to be published by Interplay in September 1994, but it was never released. In 2012, the Jaguar port of the game was confirmed and approved by Chahi. It was released as a limited collector's item in cartridge form, complete with a box and manual published by the association Retro-Gaming Connexion (RGC) in 2013. The game engine was rewritten especially for the Atari Jaguar to make use of the console's several processors: the GPU and blitter perform polygon rendering; the GPU performs on-the-fly data decompression; the DSP plays stereo music and sound effects; and the 68000 CPU performs JIT compilation and execution of the scripts. The Jaguar version is playable in the original graphics 16-color mode and Deluxe 15th Anniversary graphics 256-color mode. It can be played in normal and speed-run modes. It supports five languages: English, German, French, Italian, and Spanish.

=== 15th Anniversary ===
After the release of the Pocket PC version, in 2006 Chahi created a new Windows version targeted at Windows XP. Emmanuel Rivoire increased the resolution to 1280×800 pixels and Chahi created more detailed backgrounds. He found that his original choice to use polygons for the game characters enabled him to use the original character art at a higher resolution. The game still supports the original 320×200 resolution, as well as the original background art (as an option), and it features twice as many checkpoints as the original, which makes it somewhat easier, as well as newly remixed sounds.

The game does not include Interplay's extra music, but it includes the extra level, as well as the added enemies and hazards from the console versions. This version is part of the Another World 15th Anniversary Edition CD-ROM released in 2007, which also includes a development diary, an exclusive postcard autographed by Chahi and a separate soundtrack CD. The CD-ROM version of 15th Anniversary Edition contains strict digital rights management technology – upon installation, the game verifies the user's serial number through the Internet, allowing only for five installations of the game using any given serial number. Uninstallation does not reset the count, so after five installations, the player must purchase a new copy. This problem does not exist on the digital copy sold by GOG.com.

=== 20th Anniversary ===
At the 2011 Game Developers Conference, Chahi announced that an Apple iOS port of the title would be created by DotEmu and distributed by BulkyPix. On September 22, 2011, BulkyPix released a special 20th anniversary edition for the iPhone/iPad, featuring a switch between the original and HD graphics, new intuitive touch controls or a classic D-pad, three difficulty modes and remastered sound effects. The Android version was released in March 2012, the Steam version was released on April 4, 2013 and the GOG version was released April 22, 2013 (15th Anniversary Edition available on GOG in the same package as 20th Anniversary Edition).

Retouching the background in such high resolutions was not so easy. I had to find the equilibrium between details and vectorial design. ... Finally, I decided to use subtler shades of light than before with some very crisp detail and razor edge polygons.

— Éric Chahi

The console versions of the 20th Anniversary port were released by Digital Lounge for Xbox One, PlayStation 3, PlayStation 4, PlayStation Vita, Wii U, and Nintendo 3DS in June 2014. The three PlayStation versions allow cross-platform functionality. According to Digital Lounge, the goal was to "simply to deliver the original experience of Another World faithfully, with the benefits of today's hardware and a high level of polish". Chahi said the animations were "refined to remove the rough edges revealed by such a high resolution rendering" of up to 2560×1600 pixels. Digital Lounge and DotEmu also worked on the port for the Nintendo Switch, which was released on July 9, 2018.

Another World, along with Flashback, shipped as a single retail package by Microids for the PlayStation 4, Switch, and Xbox One on April 16, 2020 in Europe.

== Reception ==
Reception

Aggregate scores
Aggregator	Score
GameRankings	SNES: 84% PC (15th Anniversary Edition): 73%
Metacritic	iOS: 80/100; WIIU: 73/100; XONE: 65/100; PS4: 53/100; NS: 75/100

Review scores
Publication	Score
Computer and Video Games	94%
IGN	8.5/10
Amiga Action	89%
Amiga Computing	89%
Amiga Force	90%
Amiga Format	82%
Amiga Power	89%
CU Amiga	91%
Electronic Games	78%
Super Play	81%
The One	93%
TouchArcade	iOS: 5/5

Another World was commercially successful, selling about one million copies during the 1990s. The game received critical acclaim. Computer Gaming World criticized the brief documentation and short length of gameplay, but praised the game's graphics and Amiga sound, and called it "one of Europe's most playable and enjoyable arcade efforts." The Lessers of Dragon gave the game 5 out of 5 stars and called it "an adventure that will keep [the player] on the edge of [one's] seat for some time to come." Reviewing the 3DO version, GamePro said "Out of This World is destined to be a classic", but that the 3DO version has too little improvement to be worthwhile for those who have already played the game.

Among many other accolades, Another World was named as number one top new Amiga game of 1992 by Amiga World and received the award for the Most Innovative New Game of the year from Electronic Gaming Monthly. In 2012, it became one of the first 14 titles added to the video game art exposition at the Museum of Modern Art. It also received the nomination for Game, Classic Revival at the 2014 National Academy of Video Game Trade Reviewers (NAVGTR) awards.

Retrospectively, Kristan Reed of Eurogamer called Another World "one of the most visionary and memorable games of its time." Reviewing the 15th Anniversary Edition in 2010, Eurogamer's John Walker called it "still utterly beautiful", adding that the game's art style is "just fantastic. Chahi's design is exquisitely simple and enormously evocative. Built from spare polygons, its paper-craft-like animation conjures the world, the creatures and the threat wonderfully." In a 2014 review of the 3DS version, Bob Mackey of USGamer opined "Another World is definitely an experience every gamer should have — and not just for the sake of checking out a historical curiosity. Another World still feels incredibly forward-thinking, almost as if Chahi had developed a game for this decade's indie scene without even realizing it."

In 2008, Tim Rogers named Another World "The best videogame of all time", describing it as "an Actual Genius's osmosed omniscience regarding game design." In 2011, Wirtualna Polska ranked the "visionary" Another World as the 15th best game for the Amiga, remembering it for a cinematic feel and "uncommonly" high difficulty (for a first-time player) and calling it "one of the most important titles in the history of electronic entertainment." In 2012, 1UP ranked this "short-but-sweet cinematic action game" as the 99th most essential video game of all time, commenting: "Especially in an age of entertainment where fans cry out for pages upon pages lore and glossaries for the tiniest minutiae of their fiction, Out of this World's dimension contains a sense of mystery that makes it all the more lonely, and often, quietly beautiful. The game can be brutal and heartbreaking, but Chahi's amazing vision makes [it] a thoroughly gripping experience." That same year, Lucas Sullivan of GamesRadar named it as number one top "cult-classic franchise" that should be rebooted in a way Prince of Persia was, commenting that "despite a small cast of characters, minimalist gameplay, and some truly grueling difficulty, Another World ... resonated with gamers in ways they weren't expecting. The game's vivid vector graphics were utterly stunning at the time, and the pacing of the heavy, nicely animated platforming naturally melded with taking in the sights of the sublime alien landscape," and adding that "slowly adapting to the hostile surroundings offered a hard-earned satisfaction and a surprisingly moving story." In 2018, Complex rated the game 60th on their The Best Super Nintendo Games of All Time, writing: "From the very beginning, Out of This World sweeps you away on its sci-fi adventure. It's almost as good as its spiritual successor, Flashback. Almost, we said." In 1995, Total! ranked the game #46 on its Top 100 SNES Games. They described the game as "A moody but amazingly fluid game which faultlessly takes you between action sections and plot scenes drawing you into the excellent story." In 1995, Flux listed the game 73rd in its Top 100 Video Games writing: "Another giant leap in cinematic gameplay, every bit as cool and smooth as the later Flashback, but far weirder. In the same year, MegaZone included the game on their Top 50 Games In History, summarizing: "Great depth and strange but functional graphics give it a movie-like feel." IGN listed Out of This World 69th in their "Top 100 SNES Games of All Time."

The alien "Beast" creature from the game's first level was ranked sixth on the GameSpot's 1999 top list of best monsters in gaming and IGN ranked the game's laser gun as the 86th best weapon in gaming history in 2012. The alien "Buddy" was ranked third on GameSpot's list of the ten best sidekicks in 2000, along with a comment that the "groundbreaking" Another World "is one of those rare games that everybody seemed to love." Discussing "Buddy" in 2013, Rock, Paper, Shotgun's Adam Smith called him still "one of gaming's greatest companions".

Entertainment Weekly wrote: "More like being in a movie than playing a video game, this leisurely paced, noir-tinted adventure demands that you use your wits to find your way out of an eerie parallel universe."

== Legacy ==
I think the story is complete. It has a lot of mystery, so doing a sequel would be very tricky. It could break the magic it has.

— Eric Chahi

A sequel titled Heart of the Alien was developed by Interplay and released exclusively for the Sega CD in 1994. The game is similar in graphics and gameplay, as the player plays as Lester's alien friend Buddy. Chahi had nothing to do with the development of the sequel, beyond suggesting "redesigning the game from the alien point of view," by which he meant making an alternative version of the original game but was misunderstood. In 2014, Polish filmmaker Bartek Hławka created a live-action fan film titled Another World: The Movie, and in 2015, Italian filmmaker Daniele Spadoni did a different fan film mixing live action footage with CG animation. Chahi has stated in several interviews that he has no intention of making a sequel, as he wants the ending of the original to remain ambiguous and fans could make their own conclusion to Lester's story.

It's not a survival horror moment, but the beginning of the game Another World made me feel like I had really been swallowed and dropped alone on a vast, new world. That scene had a deep impact on me, and it was at that moment that I first began to consider the potential games had for stirring an emotion like fear in the player.

— Silent Hill creator Keiichiro Toyama

The company that produced Another World, Delphine Software, has since gone into administrative receivership and Another World remains their most recognized game. Paul Cuisset's best-selling 1992 game Flashback, also released by Delphine but created without any involvement from Chahi, features similar gameplay and graphics and makes a few nods to Another World, including the use of personal force fields in combat, a nearly identical end text in the ending cutscene, and an almost exact motion recreation of the gun pickup cutscene. A very similar plot premise was used in 1999's Outcast by Infogrames Entertainment, also from France. The game also had a big influence on several other game designers, especially in Japan. Fumito Ueda cited Another World as an inspiration for his creation of Ico. Hideo Kojima, creator of the Metal Gear series, said it was one of the five games that influenced him the most. Video game designer Goichi Suda called it his favourite game.

Chahi returned to the concept of cinematic platform games after leaving Delphine. In 1998, he and his company Amazing Studio made Heart of Darkness, which is in many ways a spiritual successor to Another World. After that, Chahi disappeared from the game industry for several years, but in 2005 he regained interest in making video games. In 2011, Ubisoft released his next game, From Dust.
