= Liana Liberato =

American actress (born 1995)

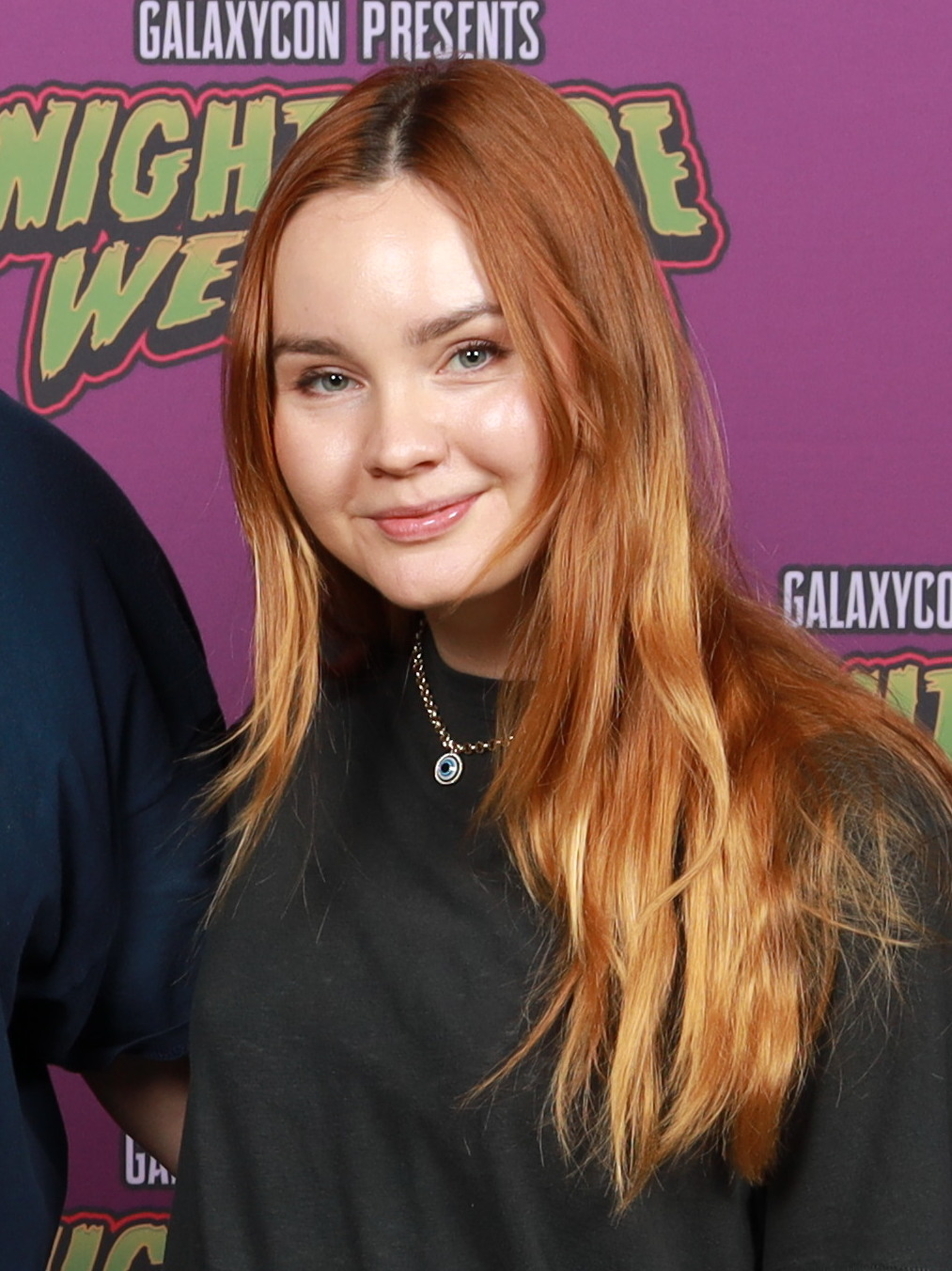
- Liberato in 2025
- Born: Liana Daine Liberato; August 20, 1995 (age 31); Galveston, Texas, U.S.
- Occupation: Actress
- Years active: 2005–present

Liana Daine Liberato (born August 20, 1995) is an American actress. She played the younger version of the female lead in the 2014 film The Best of Me and starred in the drama films The Last Sin Eater (2007) and Trust (2010), the thriller films Trespass (2011) and Erased (2012), and the horrors Haunt (2013) and The Beach House (2019). In 2017, she was part of the ensemble cast of the drama Novitiate and in 2018 she starred in the comedy Banana Split.

From 2018 to 2019, Liberato starred in the leading role on the Hulu thriller series Light as a Feather as McKenna Brady, for which she received two nominations for a Daytime Emmy Award for Outstanding Lead Actress in a Digital Daytime Drama Series (2019) and Outstanding Principal Performance in a Daytime Program (2020). In 2023, she would appear in Scream VI, Totally Killer, the Peacock comedy thriller series Based on a True Story, and Criminal Minds (2024).

== Career ==
In 2005, Liberato made her acting debut in the television series Cold Case and has appeared on Sons of Anarchy, CSI: Miami. She also made an appearance in the music video for Miley Cyrus's song, "7 Things". The following year, she appeared in the fourth season of House, and was featured in the June issue of The New York Times Magazine. In 2007, Liberato obtained the leading role in the 20th Century Fox adventure film The Last Sin Eater.

2010 found Liberato starring in the film Trust. Her performance, praised by Roger Ebert in his review of the film, won her the Silver Hugo Award for Best Actress at the 46th Chicago International Film Festival. In June, she was cast in the film Trespass. She played Kim in If I Stay and the younger version of the female lead in the 2014 film The Best of Me. In 2014, Liberato was named one of the best actors under the age of 20 by IndieWire.

== Personal life ==
Liberato was born on August 20, 1995. She is from Galveston, Texas.

== Filmography ==
=== Film ===
Year	Title	Role	Notes
2007	The Last Sin Eater	Cadi Forbes	
2007	Safe Harbour	Philippa "Pip" MacKenzie	
2010	Trust	Annie Cameron	
2011	Trespass	Avery Miller	
2012	Erased	Amy Logan	
2012	Stuck in Love	Kate	
2013	Jake Squared	Young Joanne	
2013	Free Ride	MJ	
2013	Haunt	Samantha Richards	
2014	If I Stay	Kim Schein	
2014	The Best of Me	Young Amanda Collier	
2016	Dear Eleanor	Ellie Potter	
2017	Novitiate	Sister Emily	
2017	To the Bone	Kelly	
2017	1 Mile to You	Henny	
2017	Isabel	Isabel	Short film
2017	Nobody Knows	Cheyenne Bridell	Short film
2018	Measure of a Man	Michelle Marks	
2018	Banana Split	Clara	
2019	To the Stars	Maggie Richmond	
2019	The Beach House	Emily	
2022	Dig	Lola	
2023	Scream VI	Quinn Bailey	
2023	Totally Killer	Tiffany Clark	
2023	Hidden Exposure	Sabina	
2025	The Wilderness	Charlotte	

=== Television ===
Year	Title	Role	Notes
2005	The Inside	Dina Presley	Episode: "Little Girl Lost"
2005	Cold Case	Charlotte Jones (1963)	Episode: "Strange Fruit"
2005	CSI: Miami	Amy Manning	Episode: "Recoil"
2008	House	Jane	Episode: "It's a Wonderful Lie"
2008–2009	Sons of Anarchy	Tristen Oswald	2 episodes
2012	Paradise Drive	Liana	Episode: "Our Own Daisy Duke"
2018–2019	Light as a Feather	McKenna Brady / Jennifer Brady	Main role (as McKenna); recurring role (as Jennifer)
2022	A Million Little Things	Kai	2 episodes
2023–2024	Based on a True Story	Tory Thompson	Main role
2024	Criminal Minds	Jade Waters	Recurring role; 5 episodes

=== Web ===
Year	Title	Role	Notes
2020	Day by Day	Hannah (voice)	Podcast series; episode: "Destiny Cinema 2"

=== Music videos ===
Year	Title	Artist(s)	Role	Notes	Ref.
2008	"7 Things"	Miley Cyrus	Adolescent Girl		
2011	"Maybe"	Nat & Alex Wolff	—N/a		
2014	"I Did with You" (Lyric Video)	Lady A	Young Amanda Collier	Archival footage	
2015	"Not Gonna Fall"	Kendall Custer	—N/a	Also director	
2018	"Stranger Things"	Kygo featuring OneRepublic	—N/a		

== Awards and nominations ==
Year	Award	Category	Work	Result	Refs
2011	Silver Hugo Award	Best Actress	Trust	Won	
2011	Chicago Film Critics Association Awards	Most Promising Performer	Trust	Nominated	
2011	Women Film Critics Circle	Best Young Actress	Trust	Nominated	
2019	Daytime Emmy Awards	Outstanding Lead Actress in a Digital Daytime Drama Series	Light as a Feather	Nominated	
2020	Daytime Emmy Awards	Outstanding Principal Performance in a Daytime Program	Light as a Feather	Nominated	
