= Free Ride (2013 film) =

2013 film directed by Shana Betz

- Film poster
- Directed by: Shana Betz
- Written by: Shana Betz
- Produced by: Susan Dynner; Cerise Hallam Larkin; Anna Paquin; Stephen Moyer (executive) Wendy Williams
- Starring: Anna Paquin; Drea de Matteo; Cam Gigandet; Liana Liberato
- Cinematography: Quyen Tran
- Edited by: Danny Daneau
- Music by: Jeff Russo
- Production companies: Aberration Films; Casm Films; Pantry Films
- Distributed by: Phase 4 Films
- Release dates: October 11, 2013 (HIFF); January 10, 2014 (limited)
- Running time: 86 minutes
- Country: United States
- Language: English

Free Ride is a 2013 American crime drama film directed and written by Shana Betz, based on her childhood experiences growing up in Fort Lauderdale, Florida. The film stars Anna Paquin (who also served as producer), alongside Drea de Matteo, Liana Liberato, and Cam Gigandet in supporting roles.

The plot follows Christina (Paquin), a single mother who becomes involved in drug smuggling to provide for her two daughters in the late 1970s.

Free Ride premiered at the Hamptons International Film Festival on October 11, 2013, and also opened the Fort Lauderdale International Film Festival on October 18. The film later received a limited theatrical release on January 10, 2014.

== Synopsis ==
Christina, a single mother from Ohio, escapes an abusive relationship with her two daughters, teenager MJ and seven-year-old Shell, in the late 1970s. The family relocates to the Florida coast, where Christina reconnects with a friend who introduces her to a job in drug smuggling. While she navigates the dangerous world of illicit trade to provide for her family, Christina must also manage her increasingly defiant older daughter and protect her children from the growing dangers surrounding them.

== Cast ==
- Anna Paquin as Christina
- Drea de Matteo as Sandy
- Cam Gigandet as Ray
- Liana Liberato as MJ
- Yvette Yates as Gia
- J. LaRose as DEA
- John Kapelos as Guardian
- Brit Morgan as Rain
- Lloyd Owen as The Captain
- Jeff Hephner as Bossman
- Ava Acres as Shell
- Kyle T. Heffner as Duane
- Eddie Pepitone as BK

== Production ==
Free Ride was filmed across several locations in Sarasota County, Florida, including the cities of Venice and Englewood.

== Release ==
Free Ride premiered at the 2013 Hamptons International Film Festival on October 11, 2013. It later opened the 28th Fort Lauderdale International Film Festival (FLiFF) on October 18, 2013. Following these festival showings, the film received a limited theatrical release on January 10, 2014.

== Reception ==
On the review aggregator Rotten Tomatoes, Free Ride holds a 14% approval rating based on 7 reviews, with an average rating of 3.9/10. On Metacritic, the film has a score of 41 out of 100, based on 9 reviews, indicating "mixed or average reviews."

John DeFore of The Hollywood Reporter described the film as "[a] loving portrait of a mother many would say deserves a much more critical eye." Meanwhile, Stephen Holden of The New York Times praised the film's authenticity and tone, comparing it to "the easygoing world of Jimmy Buffett songs," while noting its unsettling depiction of a world with no promise of a future.

Diego Costa of Slant Magazine rated it 2 stars out of 4, acknowledging Paquin's strong performance but critiquing the narrative's lack of commitment to either melodrama or suspense. Similarly, Elizabeth Weitzman of the New York Daily News gave it 2 stars out of 4, stating that the film failed to capitalize on its inherent tension, with "slack" direction and a "miscast" Paquin.

== Awards ==
Shana Betz's work in the film earned her the inaugural Tangerine Entertainment Juice Award (honoring an outstanding female filmmaker) at the 2013 Hamptons International Film Festival.
