= Trust (2010 film) =

2010 film by David Schwimmer

- Theatrical release poster
- Directed by: David Schwimmer
- Written by: Andy Bellin; Robert Festinger
- Story by: David Schwimmer (uncredited)
- Produced by: Avi Lerner; David Schwimmer
- Starring: Clive Owen; Catherine Keener; Jason Clarke; Liana Liberato; Viola Davis
- Cinematography: Andrzej Sekuła
- Edited by: Douglas Crise
- Music by: Nathan Larson
- Production companies: Nu Image; Dark Harbor Stories; Burk A Project
- Distributed by: Millennium Films
- Release dates: September 10, 2010 (TIFF); April 1, 2011 (United States)
- Running time: 105 minutes
- Country: United States
- Language: English
- Budget: $4 million
- Box office: $595,439

Trust (stylized as trust_) is a 2010 American drama thriller film directed by David Schwimmer and written by Andy Bellin and Robert Festinger based on an uncredited story by Schwimmer. Starring Clive Owen, Catherine Keener, Jason Clarke, Liana Liberato, and Viola Davis, the film follows a fourteen-year-old girl who becomes a victim of sexual abuse after meeting a man posing as a teenage boy on an online chat room.

Trust premiered at the Toronto International Film Festival on September 10, 2010, and was given a limited theatrical release in the United States on April 1, 2011. The film received positive reviews, with Liberato's performance earning critical praise. Liberato won the Silver Hugo Award for Best Actress at the Chicago International Film Festival, and Schwimmer was nominated for the Grand Special Prize at the Deauville American Film Festival.

== Plot ==
Annie Cameron is gifted a laptop by her parents, Will and Lynn, for her fourteenth birthday. She soon meets a boy online named Charlie, who initially claims to be sixteen years old, but later confesses that he is actually twenty, and eventually twenty-five. Though disconcerted by his dishonesty at first, Annie comes to believe that they are in love. After two months of communicating electronically, Charlie invites Annie to meet him at a local mall. Upon arriving, she discovers that he is actually in his late thirties. Though she is distraught by this revelation, Charlie eventually convinces her to accompany him to a motel, where he makes her try on lingerie he bought her before raping her, filming the ordeal.

The next day, Charlie fails to return any of Annie's calls or texts, upsetting and confusing her. Annie's best friend Brittany confronts her, having seen her with Charlie at the mall. Annie confesses that she and Charlie had sex, but dismisses Brittany's concerns. Brittany notifies the school administration. Police arrive and depart with Annie, drawing attention from other students.

After Annie's parents learn what happened, an investigation begins, led by FBI agent Doug Tate. The FBI have Annie call Charlie in an attempt to identify him, but he figures out the ruse and blocks her number before they can trace his location. Will hires a private investigation firm from New Jersey to catch Charlie, but this proves fruitless when they realize Charlie masks his IP address so that his location appears as the Czech Republic. As Will grows obsessed with catching Charlie, his relationship with his family becomes strained. He begins having nightmares of Annie's assault and questioning his work at an advertising firm, which often uses provocative images of teenagers. Annie begins seeing hospital counselor Gail Friedman, to whom she confides that she loves Charlie and believes he loves her too. When Annie returns to school, Brittany tries to apologize to her, but Annie orders Brittany to never speak to her again.

DNA evidence proves that Charlie has previously sexually abused several other pre-teen girls. After seeing photos of Charlie's other victims, Annie flees her home and seeks consolation from Friedman, breaking down in tears as she finally admits to herself that she was raped.

Hoping to regain a sense of normalcy and fall back into a routine, Annie participates in a school volleyball game. Will sees a father in the crowd taking pictures of the girls, whom he mistakes for one of the men from a list of registered sex offenders and violently confronts. Though the man declines to press charges, a humiliated Annie lashes out at Will at home and asserts that he is ruining her life.

Annie learns from Brittany that other students have been ridiculing her online, photoshopping her face onto pornographic images and publicly exposing her cellphone number and address. She rushes home and attempts suicide by overdosing on pills. After a panicked phone call from Lynn, Will finds Annie in the bathtub and forces her to vomit. Brittany spends the night to keep Annie company, mending their friendship.

Annie wakes up and finds Will sitting outside. He admits that he blames himself for failing to protect her and pleads for her forgiveness, though he believes he does not deserve it. Annie tearfully embraces him.

During a post-credits scene, it is revealed that "Charlie" is actually a high school physics teacher named Graham Weston, who is married and has a young son.

== Cast ==
- Liana Liberato as Annie Cameron
- Clive Owen as Will Cameron, Lynn's husband and Annie's father
- Catherine Keener as Lynn Cameron, Will's wife and Annie's mother
- Viola Davis as Gail Friedman, a hospital counselor
- Jason Clarke as Doug Tate, an FBI agent
- Chris Henry Coffey as "Charlie" / Graham Weston, the older man Annie meets online
- Noah Emmerich as Al Hart, Will's boss
- Joseph Sikora as Rob Moscone
- Spencer Curnutt as Peter Cameron, Will & Lynn's son and Annie's older brother
- Aislinn Debutch as Katie Cameron, Will & Lynn's youngest daughter and Annie's younger sister
- Olivia Wickline as Louise
- Zoe Levin as Brittany, Annie's best friend
- Zanny Laird as Serena Edmonds
- Yolanda Mendoza as Tanya
- Shenell Randall as Alexa

== Production ==
Filming took place in Michigan. Interior and exterior scenes at Annie's high school were shot at Dexter High School in Dexter, Michigan. Another location that was used for filming was Twelve Oaks Mall in Novi.

In an interview Schwimmer stated that he always wanted Annie to be played by a 14-year-old, as "there is a danger, if you cast someone who is 18, 19 or 20 to play 14 or 15, that very subtly, almost unconsciously, the audience is, 'Oh, this isn't so bad.'" He based the film on 14 years of involvement with The Rape Foundation and seven years of research. The scene where Annie is raped was filmed as late as possible, to ensure a "really safe environment for Liana." In the seven years of development, about 50 drafts of the script were written.

== Reception ==
=== Box office ===
Trust earned $120,016 in North America and $475,423 internationally, for a worldwide gross of $595,439.

=== Critical response ===
Trust received positive reviews from critics. As of June 2020, the film holds a 79% approval rating on Rotten Tomatoes, based on 66 reviews with an average rating of 6.7 out of 10. The critical consensus states: "Director David Schwimmer gets some gut-wrenching performances out of his actors but he still lacks the chops to fully ratchet up story tension." The film also has a score of 60 out of 100 on Metacritic based on 18 critics indicating mixed or average reviews.

In his review, Roger Ebert of the Chicago Sun-Times gave the film four stars out of four and stated: "The bravest thing about David Schwimmer's 'Trust' is that it doesn't try to simplify. It tells its story of a 14-year-old girl and a predatory pedophile as a series of repercussions in which rape is only the first, and possibly not the worst, tragedy to strike its naive and vulnerable victim. It's easy to imagine how this story could have been exploited and dumbed down. It works instead with intelligence and sympathy."
