= Heart of Darkness (video game) =

1998 video game

- Developer: Amazing Studio
- Publishers: PAL: Infogrames Multimedia (Note: Branded under Ocean in Europe. Distributed in Australia by Roadshow Interactive.); NA: Interplay Productions (Note: Branded under Tantrum Entertainment label)
- Directors: Éric Chahi; Fabrice Visserot
- Producer: Jon Norledge
- Designers: Éric Chahi; Frédéric Savoir; Fabrice Visserot; Christian Robert; Daniel Morais
- Writers: Éric Chahi; Christian Robert; Frédéric Savoir; Fabrice Visserot
- Composer: Bruce Broughton
- Platforms: PlayStation, Windows
- Release: EU: 3 July 1998 (PS); EU: 24 July 1998 (PC); AU: August 1998; NA: 8 September 1998
- Genre: Cinematic platformer
- Mode: Single-player

Heart of Darkness is a cinematic platform video game developed by French developer Amazing Studio for the PlayStation and Microsoft Windows.

The game places players in the role of a child named Andy as he attempts to rescue his dog who has been kidnapped by shadow-like spectres. The game has about half an hour of storytelling cinematic sequences and thousands of 2D animated frames, and uses pre-rendered background scenery. The game was supervised by game developer Éric Chahi, known for Another World, this time with a team of artists and developers. The game also features an original score by film and television composer Bruce Broughton.

The game is completely unrelated to the Joseph Conrad novel of the same name.

== Gameplay ==
Heart of Darkness is a cinematic platformer in the vein of Éric Chahi's previous game Another World. The player controls Andy, who faces various dangers in search of his dog, Whisky. The player progresses through the game's linear storyline by navigating various environments and solving puzzles, all whilst attempting to keep Andy from being killed by evil shadows, hungry wildlife, and perilous obstacles. Along with basic movement, such as running, jumping, and climbing, certain sections of the game give Andy additional abilities. The plasma cannon allows Andy to shoot lightning at shadows in order to disintegrate them. The special powers, which can also be used offensively against enemies, can additionally be used to grow and destroy trees born from seeds. The player has unlimited tries, with Andy returning to the most recent checkpoint when he is killed, similar to Another World.

== Plot ==
The game begins with the protagonist; a young boy known as Andy, being berated by his teacher for sleeping in class, where it is revealed that he has nyctophobia (fear of the dark). Being instructed that same day by his teacher to watch the solar eclipse, Andy takes his beloved dog Whisky to the park where dark forces steal Whisky away, prompting Andy to use his assortment of inventions and machines to get him back. Andy travels to another world called the Darkland in a homemade spaceship which promptly crashes and he has to face an assortment of obstacles to rescue Whisky and find his way home.

Throughout the game, Andy is tasked with fighting living shadow creatures and dark monsters while traversing several hostile alien environments such as a canyon, swamp, underwater cave, and lava river. He receives help in this quest from a peaceful alien race called Amigos whom he befriends, and from magic powers he obtains from a meteor referred to as the "magic rock" that can kill all the shadows of fear. These shadows can be killed with the magic rocks power, or by Andy's plasma cannon. However, the plasma cannon is quickly destroyed at the beginning of the game, Forcing you to use the magic rocks power for the majority of the game. The main antagonist is an evil sorcerer known as the Master of Darkness who intended to capture Andy instead of his dog. Somewhat resembling Andy's teacher from the beginning of the game, the Master of Darkness has an interest in capturing Andy and sends his minions to pursue him. Another major antagonist is the Vicious Servant; a sniveling pink creature that serves the Master but is quick to betray him for personal benefit.

After traveling across the varying alien environments and fighting alongside the Amigos, Andy finds himself inside the Master of Darkness' lair where he proceeds to free Whisky and join forces with the Vicious Servant to help overthrow the Master of Darkness, planning to use the magic rock's power to destroy the black hole at the lair's center. However, Andy is double-crossed by the Servant who kicks Whisky into the black hole and sends Andy into an ambush. Andy ends up fending off droves of shadow creatures and successfully following through with his plan, but falls into the black hole himself along with the Master of Darkness as the structure around him collapses.

The black hole's center is the heart of darkness and there Andy must fight the Master and face his fears once and for all. Upon succeeding the darkness dissipates and Andy awakens in his treehouse, believing the experience was all just a dream but after Andy and Whisky go to sleep and it is shown Andy has likely gotten over his fear of the dark, the player is shown the Amigos cleaning up the wreckage of Andy's ship and proving the adventure was perhaps real.

== Development and release ==
Heart of Darkness suffered a protracted development cycle marked by numerous delays and changes in platform. Development began in 1992, with the PC as the lead platform. The game was not publicly unveiled until the March 1995 European Computer Trade Show, at which time the developers said it was near completion. A version for the 3DO Interactive Multiplayer was announced, but the game spent so long in development hell that by the time it was finished, the 3DO (which was not even launched until a year after development on the game began) was no longer commercially viable. A version for the Amiga CD32 was also in development but never released. An Atari Jaguar CD version was also announced in July 1994, with internal documents from Virgin Interactive Entertainment stating that Amazing Studio showed interest in starting development on the conversion, but work on the port never moved forward beyond proposition. A version for the Panasonic M2 was also in the works. A Game Boy Advance port was announced in 2001 but it was never released.

In 1996 Sega signed a deal for the console version to be a Sega Saturn exclusive, with the PC version to be held off until after the Saturn version was released. A release date of October 1996 was announced with the Saturn version, but as this date approached, the publisher announced that the game would not be ready until late 1997. Sega Saturn Magazine commented at the time that "this is quickly becoming a joke of a situation. The game looked absolutely amazing when it was first sighted at an ECTS trade show a year or three ago, but unless it has radically changed from its sighting at E3 [in May 1996], it's going to be out-dated and out-quaffed by its contemporary software." With further delays, the Saturn was also no longer a commercially viable platform by the time Heart of Darkness was finished.

In a 2015 interview with Eurogamer, Éric Chahi said Heart of Darkness was one of his most difficult projects due to the transitions "from working alone to working with a team in the context where the industry was really changing with the CD-Rom coming, the PC and with 3D arriving." Virgin Interactive dropped funding for the project in December 1996, but the team chose to persevere with making the game. Frederic Savoir explained that "we couldn't throw away four years of our life. We didn't care what it took." After nine months of work without funding, the game was demoed at the September 1997 European Computer Trade Show, leading Interplay to adopt it.

The game's cutscenes were rendered using 3D Studio (later known as 3DS Max). According to Chahi, the team did consider using Silicon Graphics workstations, but found that the improvement over 3D Studio was not enough to justify the expense of the workstations or having to restart the work on the cutscenes. Chahi and Chris Delaporte created the game's textures themselves rather than using the 3D Studio texture library. The characters were sketched in different poses, then built with both 3D Studio and different paint programs on a PC. Then the characters were rendered for the cutscenes and scaled down as game sprites. The sprites were animated with Deluxe Paint and Deluxe Animator.

Chahi admitted in 2007 that the 6-year development of Heart of Darkness had completely exhausted him. After the game's completion, he took a hiatus on game development and pursued travelling and other interests. He made a return to the games industry in 2011 with the release of From Dust.

== Reception ==
Reception

Aggregate score
Aggregator	Score	
Aggregator	PC	PS
GameRankings	72%	75%

Review scores
Publication	Score	
Publication	PC	PS
CNET Gamecenter	4/10	7/10
Computer Games Strategy Plus	2.5/5	N/A
Computer Gaming World	4.5/5	N/A
Edge	N/A	4/10
Electronic Gaming Monthly	N/A	6.125/10 (Note: Four critics of Electronic Gaming Monthly gave the game each a score of 8/10, 2/10, 7/10, and 7.5/10.)
Game Informer	N/A	8.25/10
GameSpot	7.1/10	7.8/10
IGN	5.8/10	7.8/10
Next Generation	N/A	2/5
Official U.S. PlayStation Magazine	N/A	4/5
PC Gamer (US)	78%	N/A

The PlayStation version received favorable reviews, while the PC version received above-average reviews, according to the review aggregation website GameRankings. CNET Gamecenter, Computer Games Strategy Plus and Game Informer gave the game favourable to mixed reviews, over a month before the game was released Stateside. Next Generation, however, said that the PlayStation version was "very much a visual title that relies heavily on the storyline to keep a player's interest. And while the story is good, the gameplay isn't anything revolutionary, or even that interesting. After five [sic] years of waiting, the wait simply wasn't worth it."

Scary Larry of GamePro called the PlayStation version "a new, more whimsical game that's just as clever as Out of This World". (Note: GamePro gave the PlayStation version two 5/5 scores for graphics and sound, 4/5 for control, and 4.5/5 for fun factor.) Jason D'Aprile said of the PC version, "It's not for everyone, and its age is beginning to show, but Heart of Darkness still offers superb animation, music, graphics, and atmosphere." (Note: GamePro gave the PC version 4.5/5 for graphics, 5/5 for sound, 3.5/5 for control, and 4/5 for fun factor.)

Heart of Darkness was a finalist at the AIAS' 2nd Annual Interactive Achievement Awards for "Outstanding Achievement in Sound and Music", which was ultimately given to Road Rash 3D.
