= Éric Chahi =

French computer game designer and programmer

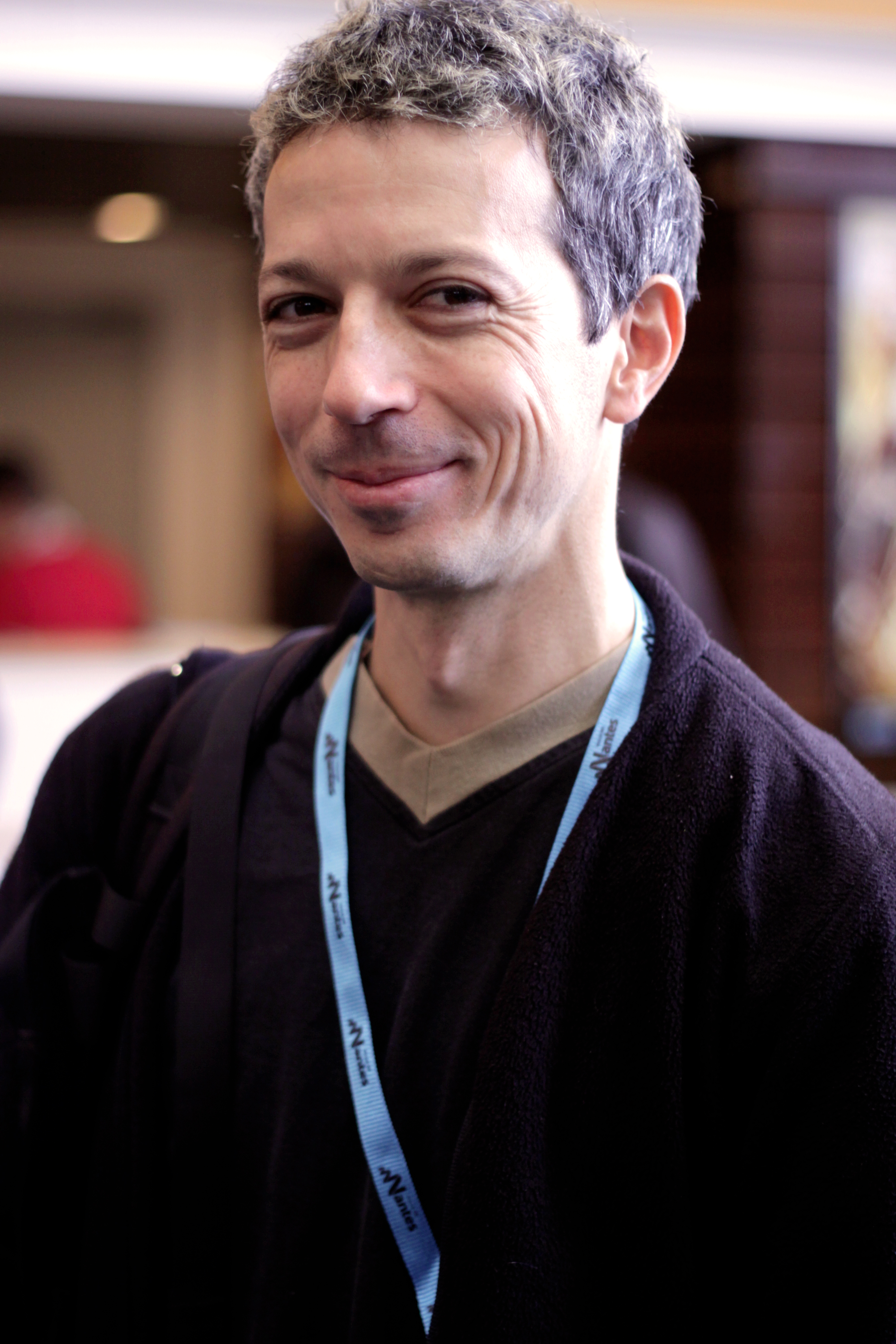
- Chahi at the 2011 Utopiales
- Born: Yerres, Essonne, France
- Occupation: Video game designer
- Known for: Future Wars; Another World; Heart of Darkness; From Dust

Éric Chahi is a French computer game designer and programmer, best known as the creator of Another World (also known as Out of This World in North America) and Heart of Darkness.

== Career ==
Éric Chahi started programming on Oric Atmos and Amstrad in 1983 for the company Loriciels. He worked on games such as Jeanne d'Arc and Voyage au centre de la Terre published for Chip. In 1989 Éric Chahi quit Chip to join Delphine Software International to work on the graphics for Future Wars, a game designed by Paul Cuisset. After this, over a period of two years, Chahi developed Another World (released in 1991) on his own, only soliciting help for the music score. Another World went on to receive critical acclaim for its atmosphere and minimalism, becoming a cult classic.

After leaving Delphine, Chahi founded Amazing Studio and became one of several designers that were working on Heart of Darkness, a side-on, flick-screen video game. It suffered numerous delays, and was in development for six years.

Chahi disappeared from the game industry for some years but returned to making games with Ubisoft in the 2010s. In April 2005 he released a free Game Boy Advance version of Another World. It was created in collaboration with programmer Cyril Cogordan, who originally started it as a fan project. It can be played using a GBA flash cartridge or emulator.

A version of Another World for mobile phones was made with the help of developer Magic Productions and released in 2005. On April 14, 2006, Chahi and Magic Productions released an updated PC version of Another World which featured remade graphics and ran on modern versions of Microsoft Windows. This HD version was ported to Xbox One, PlayStation 3, PlayStation 4, PS Vita, 3DS and Wii U in June 2014 as a 20th-anniversary edition.

On June 14, 2010, a trailer for Chahi's new game named From Dust was shown at E3. The game was released on July 27, 2011, on Xbox Live Arcade as part of the 2011 Summer of Arcade, is described as a mix between Populous and Black and White. It was also released on the PC later on August 17, 2011, and later was released for the Chrome web browser.

In December 2012, Another World was added to the collection of the New York Museum of Modern Art.

In November 2014, he made a 3D Interactive Lava Simulator for the Volcano Museum La Cité du Volcan on Réunion Island near Madagascar.

In 2016, he created the indie video game studio Pixel Reef in Montpellier, France to work on a new title Paper Beast. This project came out of the work he did for the Réunion Volcano Museum while studying the island's Piton de la Fournaise volcano for these simulations. Chahi started Pixel Reef, along with Sahy and two others after the museum project was finished to work on this game, and as of 2019, the team now numbers 16.

Paper Beast went on to release for PlayStation 4 on March 24, 2020 and on July 24, 2020 for Windows.

== Games ==
- 1983 Frog (Oric 1; ASN diffusion)
- 1983 Carnaval (Oric 1; ASN diffusion)
- 1984 Le Sceptre d'Anubis (Oric 1; Micro Programmes 5)
- 1984 Doggy (Oric 1; Loriciels)
- 1985 Infernal Runner (Amstrad CPC; Loriciels)
- 1986 Le Pacte (Loriciels)
- 1987 Danger Street (Amstrad CPC; Chip)
- 1988 Journey to the Center of the Earth
- 1989 Joan of Arc: Siege & the Sword
- 1989 Future Wars (original French title: Les voyageurs du temps, Interplay)
- 1991 Another World (title in North America: Out of this World, Interplay)
- 1998 Heart of Darkness (Interplay)
- 2011 From Dust (Ubisoft)
- 2020 Paper Beast (Pixel Reef)
