= Kuedo =

- Also known as: Jamie Vex'd
- Born: Jamie Teasdale; London, England
- Occupation: Record producer
- Years active: 2005–present
- Labels: Brainfeeder; Knives; Planet Mu
- Formerly of: Vex'd

Jamie Teasdale, better known by his pseudonym Kuedo, is an English record producer from London. He is a member of Vex'd, along with Roly Porter. He is based in Berlin, Germany.

== Biography ==
Kuedo released the Dream Sequence EP in 2010, and the Videowave EP in 2011. His debut studio album, Severant, was released in 2011 through Planet Mu. It received universal acclaim from critics.

Kuedo then released two EPs: Work, Live & Sleep in Collapsing Space (2012) and Assertion of a Surrounding Presence (2015). He released his second studio album, Slow Knife, in 2016 through Planet Mu.

His third studio album, Infinite Window, was released in 2022 through Brainfeeder.

== Discography ==
=== Studio albums ===
- Severant (Planet Mu, 2011)
- Slow Knife (Planet Mu, 2016)
- Infinite Window (Brainfeeder, 2022)

=== EPs ===
- In System Travel (as Jamie Vex'd; Planet Mu, 2009)
- Dream Sequence (Planet Mu, 2010)
- Videowave (Planet Mu, 2011)
- Work, Live & Sleep in Collapsing Space (Planet Mu, 2012)
- Assertion of a Surrounding Presence (Knives, 2015)
