= Third law =

Third law may refer to:

- Newton's third law of motion, one of Newton's laws of motion
- Third law of thermodynamics
- Kepler's third law of planetary motion
- Mendel's third law, or the law of dominance
- Third Law (album), 2016 album by Roly Porter

== See also ==
- Rule of thirds
- Rule of three (disambiguation)
- Three Laws of Robotics
