= Third Law (album) =

Studio album by Roly Porter
- Released: 22 January 2016
- Genre: Electronic
- Length: 52:08
- Label: Tri Angle
- Producer: Roly Porter

Roly Porter chronology
Life Cycle of a Massive Star (2013)	Third Law (2016)	Kistvaen (2020)

Third Law is the third studio album by British record producer Roly Porter. It was released on 22 January 2016 through Tri Angle. It received universal acclaim from critics.

== Background ==
Roly Porter is a British record producer. He is a member of Vex'd, along with Jamie Teasdale. The duo released Degenerate (2005) and Cloud Seed (2010).

Third Law is Porter's third solo studio album, following Aftertime (2011) and Life Cycle of a Massive Star (2013). It was released on 22 January 2016 through Tri Angle.

== Critical reception ==
Professional ratings
Aggregate scores
Source	Rating
AnyDecentMusic?	7.6/10
Metacritic	83/100
Review scores
Source	Rating
AllMusic	4/5 stars
Exclaim!	8/10
Mixmag	8/10
Pitchfork	8.0/10
PopMatters	8/10
Resident Advisor	4.2/5
Spin	8/10
Tiny Mix Tapes	3.5/5
XLR8R	8/10

According to the review aggregator Metacritic, Third Law received "universal acclaim" based on a weighted average score of 83 out of 100 from 12 critic scores.

Paul Simpson of AllMusic described the album as "another stunning, occasionally overwhelming mass of sound utilizing choral voices, strings, and vintage synthesizers in addition to pulverizing percussive bursts." He added, "As eye-opening as its cover art, Third Law is a startling, fascinating listen and another triumph for Porter." Harley Brown of Spin stated, "In trying to transcend dance music, he's actually made its purest form: an album that's a listening experience."

Bryon Hayes of Exclaim! stated, "Just as deep and cosmic in scope as its predecessor, this album eschews traditional beats in favour of a primordial throb, a rhythm that seems to originate deep within the planet's core." He added, "Enrobed in a thick coat of static and flanked by darkness, these eight lengthy pieces are full of all manner of uncanny spirits." Brian Duricy of PopMatters stated, "In the history of electronic music paying homage to our ideas of outer space, Porter has crafted a deserving addition to the canon."

=== Accolades ===
Year-end lists for Third Law
Publication	List	Rank	Ref.
The Quietus	Albums of the Year 2016	67	

== Track listing ==
All tracks are written by Roly Porter.

Third Law track listing
No.	Title	Length
1.	"4101"	7:57
2.	"In System"	4:52
3.	"Mass"	5:47
4.	"Blind Blackening"	8:33
5.	"High Places"	5:08
6.	"In Flight"	6:13
7.	"Departure Stage"	6:49
8.	"Known Space"	6:49
Total length:		52:08

== Personnel ==
Credits adapted from liner notes.

- Roly Porter – production
- Cynthia Millar – ondes Martenot
- Paul Jebanasam – guitar
- Matt Colton – mastering
- Dr.Me – design
- Suren Manbelyan – photography
