= Second law =

Second law may refer to:

- The second of Newton's laws of motion
- Second law of thermodynamics
  - The 2nd Law, a music album by the English rock band Muse
- Mendel's second law of independent assortment
- Second Law, or in Greek Deuterosis, the Mishnah, which comes after the Law of Moses
- Gossen's Second Law in economics

== See also ==
- Three Laws of Robotics
