= Joan of Arc: Siege & the Sword =

1989 video game

- Developer: Broderbund
- Publishers: NA: Broderbund; EU: GO! Media Holdings
- Platforms: AmigaIBM PC, Atari ST
- Release: 1989
- Genre: Action/Adventure

Joan of Arc: Siege & the Sword is a 1989 video game published by Broderbund.

== Gameplay ==
Joan of Arc: Siege & the Sword is a game in which the player is King Charles of France in the year 1428 and must use the army assembled by Joan of Arc against defiant French dukes and the invading English.

== Reception ==
Chris Lombardi reviewed the game for Computer Gaming World, and stated that "It has a wonderful setting, a nice 'look and feel', and elements that truly capture the spirit of the historical period, but the prevalence and nature of the action sequences, along with the quirks in Al and design, keep it from being "all that it could be" and prevent one from offering a wholehearted recommendation."
