= Future Wars =

1989 video game

- European cover art
- Developer: Delphine Software
- Publisher: Delphine Software
- Designer: Paul Cuisset
- Programmer: Paul Cuisset
- Artist: Eric Chahi
- Composer: Jean Baudlot
- Engine: Cinematique
- Platforms: MS-DOS, Amiga, Atari ST, PC-98, X68000
- Release: 1989
- Genre: Point-and-click adventure
- Mode: Single-player

Future Wars, subtitled in Europe as Time Travellers and in North America as Adventures in Time, and known in France as Time Travellers: The Menace (French: Les Voyageurs du Temps: La Menace), is an adventure game from Delphine Software International, released in 1989. The game is mainly the work of Paul Cuisset (story and programming) and Éric Chahi (graphics). The game was intended to be the first of a series of adventure games revolving around time travelling but later episodes were never made.

== Gameplay ==
Future Wars is played by left-clicking for character movement, and right-clicking for character actions. The actions available in the right-click popup menu are: Operate, Examine, Take, Use and Inventory. "Use" had a subcategory which enabled the player to drag and select the items in their inventory.

== Plot ==
The player is not given a name throughout the game and the game cursor identifies him only as "hero". According to later references the game starts in 1990.

The player starts as a window cleaner outside a skyscraper on an electric elevator platform, when "Ed the boss" opens a window and shouts at him, causing him to knock his cleaning bucket over. Initially to refill his bucket, the player then can enter the building through the now-open window and after examining a map with a missing flag-pin, discovers a secret passage leading to a hidden room with strange machines in it. There he acquires some documents in an alien language which he keeps in the inventory.

One of the machines transports the player to the year 1304, where he rescues a damsel in distress from a local monastery. He learns that she is Lo'Ann, a time traveller who came with her father Lear to thwart an alien plot to plant a long-delay time bomb, and he helps them in their mission against the Crughons. However, by learning things he should not, he must be taken to the Supreme Council of the future so that his fate is decided.

The player is then transported to the 44th century to meet the council during an attack by the Crughons. After a minor mishap and subsequently having to make his way through the ravaged city of Paris II, the player eventually boards a shuttle to take him to the council's city, only to be kidnapped by the Crughons. He is rescued by Earth forces but subsequently accused of being a Crughon spy as he is still carrying the Crughon documents with him; he is only saved from execution by Lo'Ann who vouches for him to the Council.

The Council then explains history to the player: Humans had abandoned Earth and were living in colonies when the war with the Crughons began a century ago. The war pushed them to rehabilitate the abandoned Earth. They built a "time-space energy shield" system called S.D.I. "in memory of the past" which prevents the Crughons from both attacking Earth and also teleporting themselves through the shield. However, the Crughons managed to visit Earth in different periods of the past and plant three time bombs in the location of the future three S.D.I. generators. Once activated, the bombs cannot be deactivated and the only options are to either prevent the Crughons from planting them, or to prematurely detonate them. For now, Lo'Ann managed to defuse one of them with the player's help in the Middle Ages. (Note: This is a plot hole and contradiction - narration says the bombs cannot be deactivated, but Lo'Ann does exactly that to prevent the 1304 detonation.) However the one from the player's era detonated, allowing the Crughons to attack. Thanks to the documents the player was carrying, the Council determine that the third bomb was planted in the Cretaceous period.

The player and Lo'Ann then travel there to foil the Crughon's attempt. After an arcade sequence and the wounding of Lo'Ann, the player boards their spacecraft and travels to their headquarters to detonate the bomb prematurely. The game ends when after successfully detonating the bomb long before hominids even evolve (and providing an alternate explanation for the Cretaceous–Paleogene extinction event), the player returns to the 44th century to fight further battles against the Crughons.

== Reception ==
Reception

Review scores
Publication	Score
Amiga Computing	93%
Amiga Format	84%
CU Amiga	88%
Zzap!64	91%

Upon release, Future Wars received positive reviews.

Computer Gaming World's Allen Greenberg praised the game's story as good, its graphics as "very imaginative and at times absolutely striking" and its musical score as "a respectable soundtrack which many will consider superior to most of those composed and released for theatrical films" but stated the same graphical detail was frequently hiding important objects vital to solving the game and hindering the player's movement in certain cases. It also criticized the Cinematique engine as "not quite the innovation Future War's designers claim it to be—similar features have appeared in games by Sierra as well as Lucasfilm."
