= From Dust =

2011 video game

- Developer: Ubisoft Montpellier
- Publisher: Ubisoft
- Director: Éric Chahi
- Producer: Guillaume Brunier
- Designers: Denis Muffat Meridol; Benjamin Dumaz; Swann Martin-Raget; Simon Choquet-Bottani
- Programmer: François Mahieu
- Artist: Bruno Gentile
- Writer: Laurent Genefort
- Composer: Tom Salta
- Platforms: Microsoft Windows; Xbox 360; PlayStation 3; Google Chrome
- Release: 27 July 2011: Xbox Live Arcade; WW: 27 July 2011 Microsoft Windows; WW: 17 August 2011 PlayStation Network; NA: 13 September 2011; EU: 14 September 2011 Google Chrome; WW: 23 May 2012
- Genre: God game
- Mode: Single-player

From Dust is a god video game, designed by Éric Chahi and developed by Ubisoft Montpellier. The game was released for Microsoft Windows, PlayStation Network, and Xbox Live Arcade in 2011. Described as a spiritual successor to Populous, the game revolves around The Breath, which was summoned by a tribe to help them seek and recover their lost knowledge. In the game, players, controlling a cursor, can manipulate matter such as lava, soil, and water. Players can help the tribespeople to overcome challenges including finding different totems and overcoming natural disasters. In addition to the story mode, the game features a Challenge mode which offers a shorter, but harder experience.

Originally starting its life as a strategy game, From Dust marked the return of Éric Chahi to the video game industry following an extended sabbatical after the completion of his last game, Heart of Darkness. The project was created as a result of his fascination with volcanoes, and his desire to combine the ambivalence and violent characteristics of their nature in a new video game. The team was further inspired by African and New Guinean tribes, Conway's Game of Life, works of Polish painter Zdzisław Beksiński, and Koyaanisqatsi. Some features, such as the biological life cycle of the tribespeople, were left out of the game because of the huge amount of work they would require. Ubisoft was originally doubtful about the project but was later convinced by Chahi. The game was made by a small team within the Montpellier studio, so was considered an independent game produced by a large publisher. The game was announced at E3 2010 as Project Dust.

The game received a generally positive reception on release, with critics praising the game's physics, simulation, openness and graphics, while criticizing the game's artificial intelligence and camera angles. Opinions on the game's Challenge mode and mission design were polarized. The PC version of the game fared worse than other platforms for its technical issues and digital rights management. The game was a commercial success for Ubisoft, selling over half a million copies and became Ubisoft's fastest-selling digital game. Despite its success, Chahi confirmed that he will not return to develop a sequel.

== Gameplay ==
In From Dust, the tribe can learn songs from ancient relics, in this case "repel water" allows a village to survive a tsunami unharmed.

In From Dust, players assume a god-like, first-person perspective from which they manipulate an archipelago environment in an effort to save and enlighten a nomadic tribe and help them to seek their lost knowledge. With a spherical cursor, the user controls certain types of matter in real time. Lava cools to form solid rock, vegetation propagates in soil and spreads naturally once a village is built, and moving water quickly erodes the terrain. Physical changes to the world occur extremely rapidly, allowing players to restructure islands within minutes.

Campaigns in From Dust are structured as a sequence of missions, whereby completing certain objectives expedites the tribe's progress and bestows additional powers, such as the capacity to jellify water. Tribal shamans alert the player to natural disasters, notably tsunamis and volcanic eruptions, shortly before they occur. These disasters can be inhibited through creative, physical manipulation of the environment: a tsunami can be jellified, wildfires extinguished, and lava flows diverted. Although there is no 'explicit sandbox' mode, Chahi stated that each mission features a distinct map, which the player can return to and manipulate further.

From Dust has the option of two main game modes, one being the Story mode, the other a Challenge mode. The former consists of a sequence of missions which play through the story of a lost tribe who are using the player (who controls "The Breath") to travel to different levels in an attempt to discover what happened to their old tribe. By helping the tribe to find the different totems scattered on a map, they can begin constructing their village next to the totem. Players can also send tribespeople to look for magical stones, which will grant them the ability to manipulate the world, by repelling water and fire for example. When the tribe successfully builds villages next to every totem, a portal will open and the player can proceed into the next map. These maps become more and more challenging as players progress. New elements, such as trees that erupt in fire, and plants that explode, are introduced in later levels.

Challenge mode employs similar gameplay to that of the Story mode. The difference is that the gameplay for Challenge mode is faster-paced, offers more puzzles, and sacrifices any storyline in this mode. It consists of 30 levels and players must fulfill certain conditions before succeeding. Each level lasts only a few minutes, offering more exciting, yet harder, gameplay. The time needed for players to complete a level is recorded in an online leaderboard which can be viewed by other players.

== Story ==
From Dust's story revolves around a tribe which has lost the knowledge of their ancestors – The Ancients. They find themselves located in unknown territory. To solve this problem, the tribe gathers and summons "The Breath", controlled by the player, hoping that it will help them to communicate with nature. However, after the summoning, the tribe desperately want answers to their questions, and have a strong desire to recover the lost knowledge. The Breath then guides the tribe to different totems allowing them to perform rituals and to construct villages and settlements. A passage will unlock and allow the tribe to discover new lands and places.

After discovering and journeying through islands of different characteristics, the tribe, with the help of The Breath, have overcome numerous natural disasters including tsunami and volcanic eruption. The tribe follows the path of The Ancients, yet their lands are nowhere to be found. By the last island, the players are given the chance to place the totem around the island and create and form their own island. After placing the final totem, the tribe reaches the place for the final ritual. After the ritual is completed, the entire island collapses and reshapes and sinks into the sea, leaving only the passageway above sea level. After the tribespeople pass the gateway, they realize that they have returned to the first island where they began their journey. As the game closes, the narrator ends the story with the words: "And here we are, as on the first day."

== Development ==
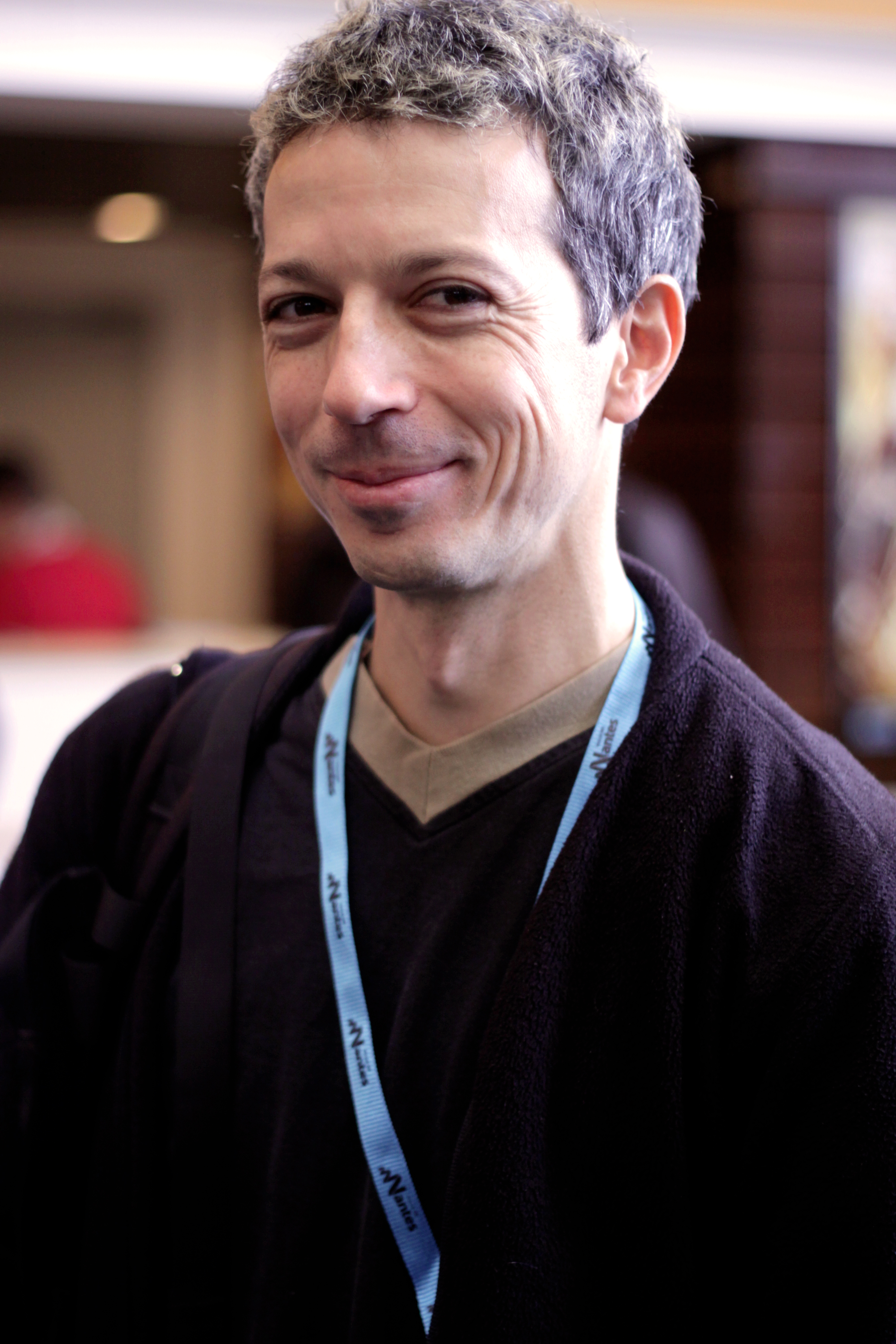
Éric Chahi, the game's director

On 14 June 2010, Ubisoft announced the development of From Dust at E3, and the appointment of Éric Chahi as the Creative Designer. Codenamed Project Dust, it was marketed as a spiritual successor to Populous, a game developed by Peter Molyneux and Bullfrog Productions in 1989. The development team used the proprietary LyN game engine. Chahi described the game as playing like a sandcastle game, but with elements like lava. On 16 August 2010, during Gamescom and the European Game Developers Conference in Cologne, Ubisoft unveiled technical footage showing the game's physics engine in detail. In the technical sequence, a narrator explains the user's interactions with the environment, and the effects of each physical element upon the other. During the conference, Chahi presented a lecture entitled "Creating a High-Performance Simulation: A Dynamic Natural World to Play With", demonstrating the world editor that underlies the environment simulation.

Ubisoft's decision to release the game via the internet was taken partly to avoid distribution and manufacturing costs, but also to enable creative options for the team and to allow for future features, such as a world editor, multiplayer, or other enhanced content later in the development cycle. Guillaume Bunier, Ubisoft's producer, acknowledged that "some people would not be able to play it", but argued that the majority of individuals interested in the game would be using PlayStation Network, Xbox Live Arcade, and Steam. In the event that From Dust became a "huge success", Bunier suggested that the company could do another, disc-based version. When questioned about the suitability of the game for the console market, he responded by observing that other atypical games were successful on such platforms, notably Flower on the PlayStation 3 (PS3). The OnLive game system, the PS3, and the Xbox 360 were "powerful machines", and From Dust would utilise their superior capacity to operate the simulation. From Dust was released for the Xbox 360 on 27 July 2011. It was later released for Microsoft Windows in August 2011, the PlayStation Network in September 2011, and Google Chrome in May 2012.

=== Influences ===
Mount Yasur's eruption inspired Chahi to develop a game based on natural forces.

Following the completion of Heart of Darkness in 1998, Chahi left the video game industry to explore other interests, and subsequently developed a passion for volcanology. In the past, Chahi self-produced video games, as the PC market was independent games-oriented. However, the independent game's importance diminished by 2006, so Chahi decided to work with a publisher instead. He presented the concept to Ubisoft in 2006. According to Chahi, it was not difficult to convince Ubisoft to fund the project, though initially there was hesitation and the proposal was rejected. After the company reversed its decision, the team spent approximately two years meeting with the key people within Ubisoft; development properly began in January 2008. The team initially only had three people, but it was expanded to about 15 to 20 people, which was considered a small team for Ubisoft.

According to Chahi, he was inspired by his 1999 trip to Mount Yasur's crater in Vanuatu. The scenery, and the power of the volcano, which was extremely active at the time, fascinated and scared him. Chahi, still intending to make another video game "before [he] died", hoped that his next project could convey the: "ambivalence of Nature, beautiful and potentially violent at the same time". Becoming more and more interested in the world's natural forces, Chahi went on to visit different volcanoes, including Dolomieu crater on Reunion Island, and a volcano in the Indian Ocean. Once the development was underway, Montpellier even recorded audio from a real volcano for inclusion in the game. Nature and cycle were some of the most important key elements of the game. The team intended to create different cycles and loops that would result in different kinds of interaction between the environments. For example, the tide cycle and eruption cycle changes dynamically, and it impacts the growth of plants and the lives of the villagers. According to Chahi, the cycle allows players to anticipate what will happen next.

While discussing the game's visual elements and art direction, developers revealed that they used several locations on Earth, such as the Yemeni islands of Socotra, lagoon archipelagos of Polynesia, and central Sahara as sources of inspiration. The team also worked with science fiction novelist Laurent Genefort to create the game's world. Bruno Gentile, Art Director of From Dust, stated that the world possessed strong visual contrasts, with "rich and swarming life full of weird shapes and colors". Inhabitants of From Dust wear masks, which serve as a motif representing mystery and uniqueness. Gentile commented that after the developers researched African and New Guinean tribes, one of Ubisoft Montpellier's concept artists developed the idea of a large mask, constructed from nacre. Chahi remarked that the team had drawn inspiration from various musical instruments, especially slit drums used on the Vanuatu islands, and indicated that music was "a key part in the gameplay and design". While tribes do not develop technologically, the team decided that their culture would evolve as they discovered "their world and their past". The game utilizes a rich color palette, which allowed the team to create strong color contrast and to "express the beauty of nature".

In an interview with Eurogamer, Chahi emphasised that the developers tried initially to avoid including overt religious elements in the game. Tribal worship, totems, and animal-shaped monuments are examples of the quasi-religious characters of From Dust. Chahi explained that, during one mission, the player would physically divide an ocean in order to assist their tribe in crossing it and so forth. He indicated that Ubisoft Montpellier were reluctant: "we didn't want to take it in this direction", but the "game kept pushing us back to it". When asked the meaning of the game's title, Bunier remarked that "it's just another universe, another place, something people create from dust". Separately, Chahi commented that the game centered on the fragility of life and brevity of humankind.

It's like the simulation was... you see the wall behind this window? Imagine that, maybe, there is a beautiful painting, and you can only see part of it. That was before the directed interaction. Then you break this wall, it makes a big window on this place for the picture.

— Eric Chahi, director of From Dust

According to Chahi, the game began its life as a strategy game. The core of the game is that players are "giving powers to [their] people". However, the team later shifted the format to a god game hoping players would interact with the environment and simulation, and not treat those elements as a background. Many original concepts, such as natural disasters, remained intact in the final game. Other influences for the game include Conway's Game of Life, a mathematical model of the 1970s, plant propagations, the works of Polish painter Zdzisław Beksiński, and Koyaanisqatsi, a film directed by Godfrey Reggio which shows slow motion and time-lapse footage of cities and many natural landscapes across the United States.

=== Mechanics ===
A crucial aspect of the user interface is the sphere, which players use to manipulate aspects of the environment, such as water.

An essential aspect of From Dust is the environment simulation, which underlies the player's interactions with the world. Developers intended that the world appear as a 'living thing', a dynamic and spontaneous entity, irrespective of the player's actions upon it. Chahi emphasised the difficulty of balancing this technical simulation with individual enjoyment, commenting that sometimes: "it would take days to find the right value for gameplay that's also aesthetically pleasing". Montpellier accommodated this dynamism through a system of rules which govern the elements of the simulation: flowing water and moving soil result in the emergence of rivers; lakes at the base of a volcano accumulate sediment, which increases their viscosity; and similar rules govern volcanic eruptions, lava flow, and the spread of vegetation. With each rule, the layers accumulate to the point at which the developers are able to create an entire landscape. According to Chahi, simulation is the most challenging part of the game, as it requires developers to put much effort into optimisation because of its high computation demands. Chahi added that the game's programme is similar to that of VS Assembly, where the computation will be stored in the cache memory, allowing for fast computing. The team intentionally avoided developing any algorithms for objects like rivers and volcanoes, as they hoped that it would flow dynamically and naturally.

Regarding physics in the world of Dust, Chahi commented that the developers had: "worked hard to translate a vision of the power of the Earth moving and exploding in the game". Volcanic eruptions, explosions, and lava flows, function in a way similar to actual volcanoes, such as Mount Etna. However, the developers opted for more theatrical, "visually impressive" tsunamis. Dynamic textures were used to represent water transparency, moving lava, and the real time adaptation of rock and soil to fluids.

A central aspect of the user interface is the Breath, with which players interact with the world and manipulate events. When a user selects a material, such as water, the appearance of the Breath changes accordingly and the fluid can be placed directly onto the surface of the world. Chahi stated that the developers abandoned the traditional head-up display (HUD), and instead chose an abstract form, the Breath, which they then "fully integrated in the storyline". Elaborating further, he stated that a tribe's music would also affect the appearance of the breath. The game originally featured a biological life cycle system for the villagers, where players could witness their births, growth, and their eventual death. The system was dropped as it required accurate animation that the system was too sophisticated to handle. The team also had more wildlife planned for the game but it was dropped. Despite having to omit these features, Chahi claimed that he was pleased with the final product. He believed that the team had done a tremendous job expressing the relationship between humans and nature with the simulation features included in the final game.

=== Expansion ===
In August and September 2010, Montpellier designers indicated that a variety of expansions were under consideration, including a weather simulation, world editor, and multiplayer capacity. During an interview with Gamasutra, Chahi posted that the developers would eventually add a real-time weather simulation feature to the game, although the developers may not package it with the initial release. In September 2010, Chahi stated that From Dust was a "solo experience", although if the game's sales were promising, he indicated that the team would consider introducing an editor or a multiplayer mode. He stated that he had "many ideas" regarding new features, and a possible franchise, though he was more inclined working on video games without the support of a big publisher in the future.

== Reception ==
Reception

Aggregate score
Aggregator	Score
Metacritic	X360: 80/100; PC: 76/100; PS3: 81/100

Review scores
Publication	Score
1Up.com	B
Destructoid	5.5/10
Eurogamer	9/10
Game Informer	8.75/10
GameRevolution	A−
GameSpot	7.5/10
GameSpy	4/5
GamesRadar+	3.5/5
Giant Bomb	4/5
IGN	8.5/10
Joystiq	3.5/5
PC Gamer (US)	73/100

From Dust received generally favourable reviews. Metacritic ranks the PC, PlayStation 3, and Xbox 360 versions of the game with scores of 76, 80, and 81, respectively. The creator of Populous, Peter Molyneux, also had a good impression of the game.

The game's gameplay was commented on positively by critics. Its controls were praised for being simple, intuitive, accessible, and smooth, though some critics noted that the cursor sometimes suffers from fidgeting and lacks precision. Liam Martin of Digital Spy added that such controls made the game relatively relaxing to play. The game's simulation received critical acclaim. As it allows players to modify the terrain freely, and there are multiple solutions to a problem, many reviewers believed that the game encourages creativity, and that it is a "true sandbox game", with some even calling it more open than typical open world games. However, Ryan Winterhalter from 1UP.com criticized the game for its lack of a free sandbox mode, and James Stephanie Sterling from Destructoid called the manipulation mechanic "boring".

The game's visuals were also praised. The natural disaster scenes were described as breathtaking and stunning, with critics being impressed by the game's sense of scale. Eurogamer's Oli Welsh echoed this comment as he further described the game's visuals as "strange" and "organic", comparing it to the work of French cartoonist Jean Giraud. Annette Gonzalez of Game Informer similarly appreciated the visuals and the morphing effects, while Keza MacDonald of IGN described the game's overall presentation as "gorgeous, ethereal, occasionally menacing".

The game's mission design received mixed reviews. Martin criticized the limited geographical variety of each level, but Welsh applauded the map variety, adding that each level feels different, as ideas were never identical. He further praised the game's portrayal of nature, describing it as "elegantly expressed". Gonzalez added that the game's variety was sufficient, and is successful in keeping the game interesting. Some critics criticized the game's difficulty curve, and added that the later levels can be frustrating as they are significantly more challenging and demand high levels of time management. Winterhalter however, criticized the first half of the game, calling it a "tutorial" that must be endured before reaching the better missions, while describing the latter half as addictive. Justin McElroy from Joystiq added that the natural disasters featured are way too unpredictable, and lamented that the game had failed to provide players enough clues when the player failed and destroyed the entire tribe. Tom Francis of PC Gamer echoed similar statements, that the game seldom notified players of their mistakes, and that levels are excessively trial-and-error and feel too stressful for players to play.

Opinions regarding the game's Challenge Mode were mixed. Some critics considered the mode a gratifying and challenging experience, whereas others praised the mode for successfully extending the game's longevity, providing great puzzles, and adding more content to the game. Welsh, however, criticized the mode, and considered it a forced mode added to satisfy the use of Xbox Live leaderboards. Gonzalez added that most players are likely going to focus their time on the main story mode, though the challenge mode succeeds in giving players "light" entertainment.

Criticisms were generally directed at the game's artificial intelligence, where the tribespeople have trouble pathfinding and are often stuck in places, leading to players' frustration. The problem worsened significantly by the end of the game, as the later levels are particularly challenging. The game was also criticized for its camera angles, which were described as "limited".

The PC version received less favorable reviews overall. Critics of it noted the unrefined controls, limited framerate to 30 FPS, and a lack of anti-aliasing or other advanced graphics options. Ubisoft's DRM for the game, in particular, received many complaints since a constant Internet connection is required when launching the game, even though it was initially reported that the game would simply require a one-time-only activation. There were also a large number of reports that the PC version had crashing issues, glitches, and a small bracket of supported graphics cards, rendering the game unplayable for some. Ubisoft later announced that it was developing a patch that would enable offline authentication; players who were unwilling to wait could ask for a refund.

From Dust became Ubisoft's fastest-selling digital game upon release, with sales exceeding the previous record holder by 45%. As of December 2011, the game had sold over 500,000 copies across platforms since its initial release. Ubisoft was satisfied with the game's sales. Despite the game's success, no sequel was planned.
