= Roly Porter =

- Origin: Bristol, England
- Genres: Electronic
- Occupation: Record producer
- Years active: 2005–present
- Labels: Subtext; Tri Angle
- Formerly of: Vex'd

Roly Porter is an English record producer. He is a member of Vex'd, along with Jamie Teasdale. His third solo studio album, Third Law (2016), received universal acclaim from critics.

== Biography ==
Roly Porter is based in Bristol. In the 2000s, he and Jamie Teasdale began making music together as Vex'd. The duo released Degenerate (2005) and Cloud Seed (2010).

In 2011, Roly Porter released his debut solo studio album, Aftertime. In 2012, he released Fall Back: Live at Aldeburgh, a collaborative live album with Cynthia Miller. In 2013, he released another solo studio album, Life Cycle of a Massive Star.

His third solo studio album, Third Law, was released in 2016 through Tri Angle. It received universal acclaim from critics.

He composed the score for Jeffrey A. Brown's film The Beach House (2019).

In 2020, he released his fourth solo studio album, Kistvaen.

== Discography ==
=== Studio albums ===
- Aftertime (Subtext, 2011)
- Life Cycle of a Massive Star (Subtext, 2013)
- Third Law (Tri Angle, 2016)
- Kistvaen (Subtext, 2020)

=== Live albums ===
- Fall Back: Live at Aldeburgh (with Cynthia Miller; Subtext, 2012)

=== Soundtrack albums ===
- Paper Beast (with TsuShiMaMiRe; G4F Records, 2020)

=== Compilation appearances ===
- Dorohedoro Original Soundtrack ("Don't Think, Just Kill"; MHz, 2016)

== Filmography ==
=== Film ===
- The Beach House (2019)
