= Vex'd =

English electronic music duo

- Origin: United Kingdom
- Genres: Dubstep; breakstep
- Years active: 2004–2007
- Label: Planet Mu
- Past members: Jamie Teasdale; Roly Porter

Vex'd were an English dubstep duo that consisted of Jamie Teasdale and Roly Porter. They often played at early DMZ nights and were some of the early pioneers of the genre. The duo released their first album Degenerate in 2005, and disbanded in 2007 after the duo moved out to different countries. Their second album Cloud Seed featured unfinished songs from 2006 and 2007 that was eventually released in 2010 by Planet Mu.

== Discography ==
=== Albums ===
- Degenerate (2005)
- Cloud Seed (2010)

=== Singles ===
- "Function" (2004)
- "Lion/Ghost" (2004)
- "Pop Pop/Canyon" (2005)
- "Gunman/Smart Bomb" (2006)
- "Bombardment of Saturn" (2006)
- "3rd Choice" (2006)
