= List of stories set in a future now in the past =

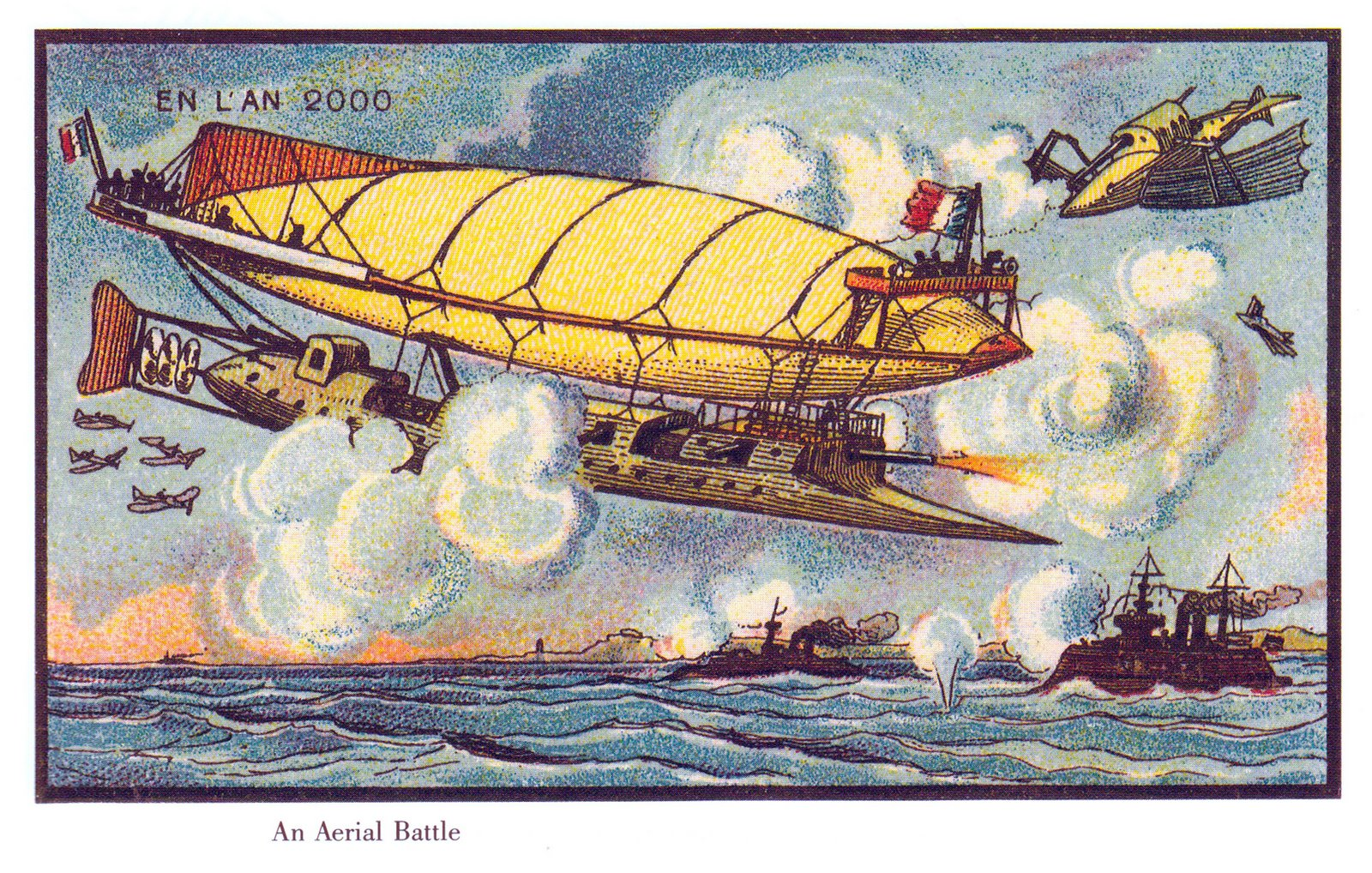
An aerial battle employing dirigibles with cannons, as depicted in En L'An 2000, a series of postcards printed between 1899 and 1910. The first flying experimental planes were between 1886 and 1910.

This is a list of fictional stories that, when composed, were set in the future, but the future they predicted is now present or past. The list excludes works that were alternate histories, which were composed after the dates they depict, alternative futures, as depicted in time travel fiction, as well as any works that make no predictions of the future, such as those focusing solely on the future lives of specific fictional characters, or works which, despite their claimed dates, are contemporary in all but name.

== List ==
Work	Form	Year of publication/ release	Year set	Predictions
1. April 2000	Film	1952	2000	Austria is still being closely watched over by the Allies, 55 years after the defeat of the Axis powers in World War II.
"11:59" (from Star Trek: Voyager)	TV series episode	1999	2000–2001, 2012	This episode accurately predicted that the Y2K bug would not turn off "a single lightbulb". The Millennium Gate, a self-contained biosphere, was completed in 2012.
12 Monkeys	Film	1995	1996–1997	Scientists are sent back in time to try to stop the spread of a virus. Per the opening titles in the film, "Five billion people died in 1996 and 1997, almost the entire population of the world. Only about 1 percent of us survived."
12 Monkeys	TV series	2015–2018	2017	In the TV series, the scientists are sent back to 2015 to try to stop the virus pandemic from happening in 2017.
17776	Serial narrative	2017	2026 (opening)	In the narrative, human senescence stops on 7 April 2026.
1900; Or, the Last President	Novel	1896	1900	Depicts a world in which political uprisings cause the collapse of the US in 1900.
Nineteen Eighty-Four	Novel	1949	1984	Set in a dystopian future in which totalitarian superstates exist in a state of perpetual war. Refers to several dates throughout the latter half of the 20th century, including a nuclear war in the 1950s. Adapted into several media, including twice for film; once in 1956 and once in 1984.
1985	Novel	1978	1985	Written at a time when trade unions in the United Kingdom had reached a peak of power prior to the union-breaking policies of Margaret Thatcher, it predicts a 1985 in which the UK is completely in thrall to unions, and unions exist for every conceivable profession.
1990	Song	1973	1990	In 1990, poverty and starvation are rampant in the United States.
1990	TV series	1977–1978	1983–1990	A bureaucratic dictatorship has ruled the UK since it went bankrupt in 1983. Magna Carta, the Constitution and habeas corpus were "thrown out". There was a failed coup to overthrow the regime in 1986. The UK's currency is the Anglodollar. The government is attempting to curb population. The House of Commons has only 400 MPs and only 20% of the population voted in the last general election. The House of Lords was abolished and converted into a dining club. By this time, the UK has a king. There were major riots in 1985 as a result of 18,000 houses being demolished and ghettos being established in their place. The Isle of Man declared independence prior to 1990. At this time, the United States had its own equivalent of the National Health Service. The series correctly predicted that parliamentary speeches would be televised by 1990.
1990: The Bronx Warriors	Film	1982	1990	Similar to Escape From New York, depicts a portion of New York sealed off from the rest of the city and handed over to street gangs. The sequel Escape from the Bronx is set sometime after this and was released in 1983.
"1993"	Song	1977	1993	Song by Boz Scaggs from his 1977 album Down Two Then Left. Predicts simulated reality.
"1996" (from Screen One)	TV series episode	1989	1996	In 1996, there is widespread terrorism and civil disobedience in the UK.
2001: A Space Odyssey	Film, novel	1968	2001 (and other eras)	Depicts a turn of the 21st century in which space travel is routine, China is a monarchy, the Moon has been colonized and artificial intelligence has reached superhuman levels. HAL 9000 is activated in 1992 (film) or 1997 (novelization). Predicted digital newspapers/the newspad and the population exceeding six billion.
"2001 & A Bit" (from The Goodies)	TV series episode	1976	2001	In 2001, cricket has somehow died out, and the sons of the Goodies must find a way to revive it.
2010	Film	1984	2010	Sequel to the 2001: A Space Odyssey film. The United States is about to go to war with a still-extant Soviet Union. The film correctly predicted that the 2008 Summer Olympics would be held in Beijing.
2010: Odyssey Two	Novel	1982	2010	Sequel to the 2001: A Space Odyssey book; the Soviet Union still exists in 2010.
2012	Film	2009	2009–2012	See also: 2012 phenomenon.
2012: Supernova	Film	2009	2012	See also: 2012 phenomenon.
2019, After the Fall of New York	Film	1983	2019	Post-apocalyptic film in which nuclear war and radiation have rendered the populace infertile. Survivors head to New York City to rescue the last allegedly fertile woman on Earth. Inspired by Escape from New York.
2020 Texas Gladiators	Film	1984	2020	Neo-Western set in a post-apocalyptic Texas.
2020 Visions	Comic	1997	2020	Accurately predicts New York City would be the epicenter of a pandemic in the year 2020. It additionally predicts Ellis Island becoming a plague colony, Florida becoming an independent state, Detroit being ruled by Sharia law, and unlicensed children becoming illegal.
2020	Webseries	2013	2020	Based on the White Paper "Project 2020: Scenarios for the future of Cybercrime" published by the ICSPA, Europol and Trend Micro.
2025 Armageddon	Film	2022	2025	Aliens invade Earth employing artificial monsters copied from Asylum movies.
2061: Odyssey Three	Novel	1987	2006–2022 (opening)	In 2007, the spaceship Tsien was built. In the 2020s, a major earthquake occurs in California and two nuclear bombings occur in a war. Predicted the end of apartheid in South Africa (albeit in the early 21st century instead of 1994) followed by a mass exodus of Afrikaners and capital flight.
20th Century Boys	Manga	1999–2006	2014–2015	The second major part of the story occurs in 2014–15 where society has become a dystopia ruled by the Friend Democratic Party. The live-action film series sets some of its events in 2015.
334	Novel	1972	2025	Birth control and eugenics are used to control overpopulation.
7th Dragon 2020	Video game	2011	2020	Dragons invade Tokyo. The sequel, 7th Dragon 2020-II takes place in 2021.
A for Andromeda	TV series	1961	1970–1972	Scientists discover and decipher a signal from outer space.
A Philosophical Investigation	Novel	1992	2013	Violent criminal acts (by men only) can be more-or-less accurately predicted with brain scans. Other predicted technologies include smartphones, video calls, and virtual reality.
Absolon	Film	2003	2010	In 2010, a virus wiped out half of Earth's human population.
The Absolute at Large	Novel	1922	1943	A reactor is invented that can annihilate matter to produce cheap and abundant energy. Unfortunately, it produces something else as a by-product, the Absolute. This leads to an outburst of religious and nationalist fervor, causing the greatest, most global war in history. Some of the more prominent political changes the war causes include expulsion of the Russian army to Africa (via Europe) by the Chinese invasion, the conquest of East Asia by Japan that cuts the Chinese conquests in Russia and Europe down to the limits of the former Austro-Hungarian empire, and the Japanese conquest of North America. The latter happened because the United States were exhausted by a bloody civil war between the supporters and opponents of the Prohibition.
The Abyss	Film	1989	1994	Set in a submersible drilling platform.
Acción mutante	Film	1993	2012	A dystopian future in which the beautiful rule and the disabled become terrorists.
Action Comics #396–397	Comic	1971	1980s–1990s	In the 1980s, there was a crewed mission to Saturn. In the 1990s, the US National Sea Frontier Project established a giant marine laboratory on the ocean floor. By this time, flying cars were common. Climate control resulted in the Arctic being defrosted. Construction workers were equipped with anti-gravity pulse rays to move heavy objects. Banks had bulletproof glass cages which could be erected to prevent robbers from escaping. Lampposts were equipped with automatic fire sensors which alerted the fire department, which used hovercraft that shot out fireproof foam. Ships had flotation collars which could keep them adrift in the event of an emergency. An instant fertilizer existed which allowed crops to grow in seconds.
Adrenalin: Fear the Rush	Film	1996	2007	Boston is quarantined after the outbreak of a deadly virus.
Aeon Flux	Film	2005	2011	A pathological virus kills 99% of the human population in 2011.
"Age of Peril" (from Tales of Tomorrow)	TV series episode	1952	1965	In 1965, lie detector results are the primary means of securing convictions.
Akira	Manga, Anime	1982–1990	2019	Set in a dystopian, post-WWIII Neo-Tokyo in the midst of civil unrest and government corruption. Made into a film and video game in 1988. Correctly predicted that the 2020 Summer Olympics would have been held in Tokyo. Additionally, graffiti in the film references the 2020 Olympics, saying "Just cancel it". Due to the COVID-19 pandemic, the quote began to be used online in reference to the potentially hazardous Olympic gathering, both as a serious wish and as a bit of a tongue-in-cheek reference.
Alien Nation	Film	1988	1991	Set in a world where aliens have landed in 1988 and are being integrated into society.
Alien Nation	TV series	1989	1995	Based on the film of the same name. Aliens arrive in 1990. See also Alien Nation: Millennium
Alien Soldier	Video game	1995	2015	In 2015, "A-Humans" live on "A-Earth" and create superintelligent cyborgs.
"'—All You Zombies—'"	Short story	1958	1963–1993	Space colonisation is routine and a Temporal Bureau safeguards the human race through time travel. Complete sexual reassignment is possible, even allowing fertility.
Americathon	Film	1979	1998	The US federal government is bankrupt and holds a telethon to avoid foreclosure and return to its original owners; the film accurately predicted the collapse of the Soviet Union.
Amerika	TV miniseries	1987	1997	By 1997, the United States has lost World War III and has been occupied by the Soviet Union for ten years.
The Angel of the Revolution	Novel	1893	1903–1904	The Brotherhood of Freedom, an association of anarchists, socialists and nihilists, established a Pax Aeronautica over Earth using aircraft. Correctly predicted the first heavier-than-air flight would occur in late 1903.
An Anglo-American Alliance	Novel	1906	1960	In 1960, the United States and the British Empire are the world's major colonial powers. Technological advances include prenatal sex discernment, suspended animation and a cure for laziness.
Anno Domini 2000, or, Woman's Destiny	Novel	1889	2000	In 2000, female suffrage has been achieved throughout the British Empire, which has become an Imperial Federation. Ireland has become an independent state. As a result of Emperor Albert's refusal to marry the daughter of the President of the United States, war breaks out between the Federated British Empire and the United States. The Empire wins the war and the defeated US is reabsorbed into the Empire. Correctly predicts the spread of female suffrage and Ireland becoming a sovereign state.
"The Answer"	Short story	1959	1969	In 1969, a nuclear war between the United States and the Soviet Union devastated the entire Northern Hemisphere.
"Any Last Werdz"	Song	1993	1999	Armageddon occurs in 1999.
The Apple	Film	1980	1994	The Rapture occurs in 1994. The planet is run by the music industry.
Arc Light	Novel	1994	1999	In 1999, Russia and China are at war for control of Eastern Siberia and North Korea invades the Demilitarized Zone. Russia launches a nuclear strike at the United States, which retaliates, and World War III begins.
"Armageddon 1970" (from Imagination)	Novella	1952	1959–1970	In 1959, a handgun called a grenade pistol was invented. Prior to 1960, the first artificial satellite Albertus, named after Albert Einstein, was launched by the United States. In 1960, the Soviet Union collapsed due to internal causes precipitated by the launching of Albertus. An "almost Carthaginian peace" was imposed on Argentina after it dropped an atomic bomb on London. By 1970, the United States held unrivaled power among the other nations of the world to the point that there was little possibility of another country successfully attacking or sabotaging the US.
Apocalypse 2000	Novel	1987	c. 1990–2000	The European Economic Community becomes a fascist superstate overriding all national governments. The United States becomes isolationist, led by a former televangelist.
Armageddon 2001	Comic	1991	2001	In 2001, Earth is ruled by an oppressive tyrant named Monarch, a former hero who became evil and killed all of his comrades.
Armed Police Batrider	Video game	1998	2014	Police wear mechs.
Assassin's Creed	Video game	2007	2012	See also: 2012 phenomenon.
Assassin's Creed II	Video game	2009	2012	See also: 2012 phenomenon.
Assassin's Creed: Brotherhood	Video game	2010	2012	See also: 2012 phenomenon.
Assassin's Creed: Revelations	Video game	2011	2012	See also: 2012 phenomenon.
Assassin's Creed III	Video game	2012	2012	The game begins on October 30, 2012 (its real-life release date), and covers a period of two months until December 21, 2012, when the Earth is saved from a potentially devastating coronal mass ejection.
Astro Boy	Manga	1952–1968	2003	A world in which humans and androids coexist. Celebrations were held in Japan for Astro Boy's birthday of April 7, 2003.
The Astronauts	Novel	1951	2003	By 2003, communism has emerged as the worldwide form of government. Humanity is engaged in numerous gigantic engineering projects such as the irrigation of the Sahara, the construction of a hydro-energetic plant over the Strait of Gibraltar, climate control, and the thawing of the Antarctic and the Arctic.
Atlantis	Film	2019	2025	Set one year after the end of the Russo-Ukrainian War.
Atomic Knight	Comic	1960–1964	1986–1992	Initially set in a post-apocalyptic United States following a nuclear war which broke out on October 9, 1986. The war wiped out most of humanity and destroyed the majority of plants and animals. The radiation caused dogs to significantly grow in size which led to them being used as steeds.
Back to the Future Part II	Film	1989	2015	In 2015, hoverboards, self-lacing Nike shoes and flying cars are commonplace. The Jaws film franchise has reached its (fictional) 19th installment, directed by Max Spielberg, and pop culture from the 1980s is considered 'retro', as with Café 80s. The Chicago Cubs defeat a fictional Miami Gators team for the 2015 World Series (in reality, the Cubs would be eliminated in the League Championship Series, but would come back to win the series the next year). October 21, 2015, the "future" date arrived as in the film, was celebrated as "Back to the Future Day".
Barb Wire	Film	1996	2017	Predicts a second American Civil War in 2017, with martial law declared in all major cities in the nation except for one. Computer technology that reads people's thoughts and retinal scans that serve as a biometric passport are commonplace. The comic that the film was based on takes place in an alternate version of present-day Earth.
Batman Beyond	TV series and film	1999–2001	2019–2039	Series begins in 2019. When Bruce Wayne is in his 50s, he is forced to use a gun to stop a crime when he has a mild heart attack. Following this, Wayne retires as Batman. The rest of the series takes place 20 years later, with an elderly Wayne mentoring teenager Terry McGinnis as the new incarnation of Batman.
"Battlefield" (from Doctor Who)	TV series episode	1989	1997	The United Kingdom has a king and a lemonade costs five pounds. The Dying Days sets this story in 1997.
Battlefield 2	Video game	2005	2007	Depicts a war between the United States and China, with battles taking place on Wake Island. Several Middle Eastern states have joined to form a superstate known as the "Middle Eastern Coalition".
Battlefield 3	Video game	2011	2014	Takes place during the "War of 2014" in the Iran-Iraq area.
Battlefield 4	Video game	2013	2020	Takes place during the fictional "War of 2020" between the United States, China, and Russia.
Battle for the Planet of the Apes	Film	1973	c. 2001	A nuclear war took place between 1991 and the "turn of the 21st century".
Battle in Outer Space	Film	1959	1965	Depicts a terrestrial counter-attack against invading mind-controlling aliens from the Moon.
The Battle of Dorking	Short story	1871	~1875, ~1925	Depicts an invasion of the United Kingdom by Germany. Set a short but undetermined amount of time after the Franco-Prussian War (1870–1871), but narrated by a veteran 50 years afterwards. Established the invasion literature genre and predicted a Civil War in an independent Ireland.
BattleTanx	Video game	1998	2001	In 2001, a pandemic kills a majority of the world's women.
Beast Wrestler	Video game	1991	2020	Beasts and dragons fight one-on-one.
Berlin Without Jews	Novel	1925	1920s–1930s	A dystopian novel prophesying in uncanny detail Hitler's rise to power and the subsequent implementation of anti-Jewish laws, rendering the German capital emptied of its Jews.
Berserker	Novel	1967	20th century	Extraterrestrial radio transmissions are detected before the end of the 20th century.
Beyond the Time Barrier	Film	1960	2024	Nuclear testing destroyed the Earth's ozone layer in 1971. By 2024 the entire human population is sterile.
Bicentennial Man	Film	1999	2005–2021	The android robot "Andrew" is brought online on April 3, 2005. The remainder of the film is set decades and centuries in the future.
The Black Cloud	Novel	1957	1964	Earth is "invaded" by a giant, sentient black interstellar cloud.
"Black Easter" (from Screen Two)	TV series episode	1995	2000	In 2000, a civil war in Russia results in a vast migration of refugees to Western Europe.
Blade Runner	Film	1982	2019	Based on the novel Do Androids Dream of Electric Sheep? Set in a future in which interstellar travel has been achieved and synthetic humans are employed as slave labor. A Voight-Kampff machine is used as a tool to determine whether the subject is a human or not. Los Angeles is also portrayed as heavily polluted. Roy Batty's incept date is listed as 2016. The 1997 video game also takes place in November 2019, the same as the film. Other technologies regularly used include video calling, voice identification, virtual assistants, smart key, and flying cars. There is a machine that can zoom in on sections of a camera photo, and a blow dryer that dries hair in seconds.
"The Blessington Method" (from Alfred Hitchcock Presents)	TV series episode	1959	1980	By 1980, life expectancy has significantly increased. Ironically, Alfred Hitchcock himself would die in 1980.
Blue Comet SPT Layzner	Anime series	1985–1986	1996	By 1996, the Cold War has intensified and nuclear tensions loom. At this time, both the United States and the Soviet Union have bases on the Moon and Mars.
Bombshell	Film	1997	2011	Nano-engines are a potential cure for cancer. Bombs are inserted into people as kidney transplants.
The Bots Master	TV series	1993	2025	Ziv "ZZ" Zulander and the Robotic Megafact Corporation have invented robots that are now commonplace in society.
A Boy and His Dog	Film	1975	2024	Nuclear war has ravaged the world. Genetic engineering has granted dogs sapience and telepathy.
Breaking Dad	Play	2014	2022	The Irish economy has recovered from the post-2008 downturn, with the recovery dubbed the "Celtic Phoenix". Fianna Fáil are returning to dominance, with Bertie Ahern about to be re-elected Taoiseach aged 71.
Brick Mansions	Film	2014	2018	A district of Detroit is sealed off to protect the city from criminals. Same director and concept as District 13.
The Broom of the System	Novel	1987	1990	The "Great Ohio Desert" (G.O.D.) is constructed.
Buck Rogers in the 25th Century	TV series, film	1979	1987	Buck Rogers' spacecraft was frozen in May 1987, after which he was frozen and not revived until 2491. A nuclear war broke out in November 1987.
Bullet Witch	Video game	2006	2013	Post-apocalyptic world invaded by demons.
Burn-Up Scramble	Anime	2004	2023	Features a secret squad of the Tokyo Police called Warrior. In a later episode, there are genetically modified humans called New Warriors.
Call of Duty: Black Ops II	Video game	2012	2025	Features a Second Cold War between the United States and China.
Call of Duty: Ghosts	Video game	2013	2015–2017	Predicts Latin America unifying into a single superstate called the "Federation of the Americas" and launching an invasion of the United States with the goal of occupying and annexing it. Also kinetic weapons in space are a reality by 2017.
Call of Duty 4: Modern Warfare	Video game	2007	2011	Depicts a coup d'état in Russia and a civil war following a coup d'état in a republican Saudi Arabia that had abolished the monarchy sometime prior to 2011. The United States intervenes in the war to stop the coupists, who then detonate a nuclear bomb during a battle with the US Marines, killing tens of thousands of US servicemen.
Call of Duty: Modern Warfare: Mobilized	Video game	2009	2016	Set in the same setting as Call of Duty: Modern Warfare 2
Call of Duty: Modern Warfare 2	Video game	2009	2016	Depicts a terrorist attack at a major international airport in Moscow that is framed on the US Central Intelligence Agency by the attack's perpetrators. Under the impression the US orchestrated the attack, the Russians declare war on the United States in retaliation and World War III erupts, with the Russian Armed Forces invading the East Coast and devastating Northern Virginia and Washington, D.C. in a fierce battle with the US Army. The International Space Station is destroyed by a stolen Russian nuclear bomb detonated in the atmosphere above the US Eastern Seaboard by the UK to devastate the invading Russians via the subsequent electromagnetic pulse. Correctly predicted a terrorist attack on an international airport in Moscow happening by 2016 and the US deploying tanks to Afghanistan by 2016.
Call of Duty: Modern Warfare 3	Video game	2011	2016–2017 (Note: Epilogue takes place on January 21, 2017.)	Depicts World War III between the Russians and NATO, with fierce battles taking place in India, New York, France, Germany, the United Arab Emirates, and a Russian-occupied Czech Republic. The depicted Russian invasion of Europe has been compared to the 2022 Russian invasion of Ukraine. The comparison reveals that Russia's military capabilities were overestimated in popular culture compared to real life.
Call of Duty: Modern Warfare 3 – Defiance	Video game	2011	2016	Russia, embroiled in World War III with NATO, invades Alaska, Nevada, and Maryland.
Call of Duty: Strike Team	Video game	2013	2020	The game is set during the Black Ops story arc. It depicts a false flag operation by mercenary forces under the disguise of Russian spetnatz in Alaska, the War in Afghanistan still ongoing, and the start of a Second Cold War between the US and a coalition led by China called SDC.
Captain Canuck #1–14	Comic book	1975–81	1993	Predicted Canada would become the most powerful country in the world by 1993.
Captain Future	Pulp magazine series	1940	1990	Initially set in 1990, but left vague in later issues. Set in a space opera future in which the Solar System has been colonised, sentient androids exist, and brains can be kept alive in tanks. Correctly predicted that Pluto would have moons named Charon, Styx and Cerberus.
Carnage	Film	2017	2021	Mockumentary depicting the future transition of the entire world to veganism. In 2021, a global outbreak of swine flu hikes the price of meat.
Cauldron	Novel	1993	1998	Depicts a war in Western Europe involving a neo-imperialist France.
Cherry 2000	Film	1987	2017	In 2017, the United States has fragmented into post-apocalyptic wastelands populated by sexbots.
Childhood's End	Novel	1953	c. 2000	Set in the late 20th century, in which the United States and the Soviet Union are competing to launch the first orbital weapons platform. Aliens arrive and put a stop to it.
The Children of Men	Novel	1992	1995–2021	In 1995, global human sperm count falls to zero. By 2021, the United Kingdom abolishes democracy.
Close Combat: First to Fight	Video game	2005	2006	In 2006, the Lebanese prime minister falls ill and leaves the country for medical treatment. Taking advantage of the power vacuum, Syria invades Lebanon and Iranian-backed terrorists launch a rebellion against the Lebanese government. The United States and NATO, under the auspices of the United Nations, dispatches military forces, among them the U.S. Marine Corps, into Lebanon in order to repulse the invading Syrians and Iranians and restore order to the country. Correctly predicted a war happening in Lebanon in 2006.
Cities in Flight	Novel	1956	2013–2018	By 2013, civil liberties in the West have been severely eroded due to the Cold War, coming to resemble the Soviet model.
Class of 1999	Film	1990	1999	In 1999, North America's inner cities have become unpoliceable "free fire zones" and military androids are assigned as schoolteachers. The sequel, Class of 1999 II: The Substitute (1994), is also set in 1999.
Click	Film	2006	2017–2029	Michael Newman (Adam Sandler) finds a magic remote control that can be used to 'rewind' and 'fast-forward' through his life at will. One of the years he 'fast-forwards' to is 2017, where Michael Jackson is still alive (he died in 2009) and Britney Spears is still married to Kevin Federline (they divorced the year after the film's release). He also 'fast-forwards' to 2023 and 2029, but events there only concern Michael's family.
A Clockwork Orange	Novel	1962	1970	Juvenile delinquency is countered by extreme aversion therapy. The film adaptation was released in 1971.
"The Collapse of '98" (from My Life and Times)	TV series episode	1991	1998	In 1998, the US economy collapsed. There are fifty million people unemployed in the United States.
Code Name Phoenix	TV film	2000	2020	Global peace has prevailed, and a sinister new threat to world stability is exposed with a genetically engineered virus that can stop the human aging process.
Code 18	Video game	2011	2018	By 2018, personal jet packs and time travel are routine.
Command and Conquer: Generals	Video game	2003	2013, 2021	Set in 2021. Predicted the rise of an Islamic State-like terrorist organization called the "Global Liberation Army" in the early 2010s.
Comrade Dad	TV series	1984–1986	1999	In 1999, the United Kingdom is a communist state, having been invaded by the Soviet Union several years earlier. London has been renamed "Londongrad".
Conquest of the Planet of the Apes	Film	1972	1983 and 1991	A plague from space killed every dog and cat on Earth in 1983, which led to apes being domesticated and eventually turned into slaves. This in turn led to Caesar's revolution against humanity in 1991.
Corridor 7	Video game	1995	2012	A crewed expedition to Mars returns with an artifact which is examined in a top-secret facility. It opens an interdimensional portal from which alien creatures invade the installation.
Cosmic Voyage	Film	1936	1946	In 1946, the Soviet space program succeeds in launching the first crewed mission to the Moon.
Cowboy Bebop	Anime series	1999	2021	The first astral gate, allowing interplanetary travel in a matter of hours, is constructed in 2021. The majority of the series is set 50 years later.
Creepozoids	Film	1987	1998	Set in a post-apocalyptic Los Angeles, six years after a nuclear war.
"Cricket" (from Play for Tomorrow)	TV series episode	1982	1997	A cricket team has a computerised Wisden Almanack and is secretly an eco-terrorist group.
"Crimes" (from Play for Tomorrow)	TV series episode	1982	2002	In 2002, prisons are overcrowded, the threat of nuclear war constantly looms, and all activities are controlled and restricted.
Crimes of the Future	Film	1970	1997	Cosmetic products have wiped out all sexually mature women on Earth. Men engage in body horror and paedophilia.
Cyberball	Video game	1988	2022	American football is played with robots and an exploding ball.
Crysis	Video game	2007	2020	On August 7, 2020, North Korean forces invade the fictional Lingshan Islands near the Philippines, where they discover ancient alien structures and begin experimenting with alien technology. Raptor Team, a five-man squad equipped with advanced Nanosuits, is deployed by the U.S. Army Delta Force to extract a team of American archaeologists from the islands and encounters the aliens, which are unleashed upon the world.
Crysis 2	Video game	2011	2023	Sequel to Crysis, set in a war-torn New York City three years after the first game. With the threat of an alien invasion and the outbreak of a disease dubbed the "Manhattan virus", the city has been placed under martial law and a private military company has been contracted to restore order to Manhattan.
Cube Quest	Video game	1983	2007	In 2007, mankind fights a 'war of six planets' which results in world peace. When it grows restless after centuries of tranquility, mankind decides to explore the universe, leading it to discover the titular cube in deep space.
Cyberpunk	Board game	1988, 1990, 2005	2020	Depicts a world in 2013 where cybernetic implants are common among humans, the world is connected through a "Net", the United States has collapsed and reformed, the Soviet Union continues to exist, Moon colonies have been established, the fictional Night City was developed between San Francisco and Los Angeles, Y2K did not cause disaster, the United States led two wars in Central America, nuclear wars were fought between multiple megacorporations, and at least 17% of Americans are homeless. Cyberpunk 2020 (1990) is set seven years after the original game, where self-aware human clones have been created. The game states that the Soviet Union has split but did not dissolve.
Cyberpunk 2077	Video game	2020	2023	Set in the same world as the Cyberpunk 2020 board game but 57 years in the future. Portions of the game's story are set in or before August 2023, in which there is a fourth "corporate war" and the megacorporation Araska is bombed with fissile material in a terrorist attack by the character Johnny Silverhand, killing around 500,000 people. Cyberpunk Red (2020) also tells this story.
Danger Days: The True Lives of the Fabulous Killjoys	Album	2010	2019	Concept album by the band My Chemical Romance set in a post-apocalyptic California.
Damaged Goods (from Doctor Who)	Novel	1996	2014	On November 11, 2014, blood tests for HIV became compulsory in the United Kingdom.
Dan Dare (original stories)	Comic	1950s	Late 1990s	Depicts an interplanetary war between Earth and Venus.
"Dance of the Dead" (from Masters of Horror)	TV series episode	2005	2008	In 2008, terrorists develop a biological weapon called "Blizz" and use it in local weather patterns in the United States. This leads to the outbreak of World War III, which ravages the US.
Dark	TV series	2017–2020	2020	In the fictional village of Winden, Germany, the disappearances of several children, teenagers, and adults are linked to a time portal in a cave system that only opens once every 33 years. On June 27, 2020, Earth is ravaged in a nuclear apocalypse that leaves very few survivors.
Dark Angel	TV series	2000	2019, 2020	Set in a dystopian future after a terrorist electromagnetic pulse attack wipes out much of modern civilization. Genetic augmentation of humans is now mastered. The second half of Season 1 and the first half of Season 2 are set in 2020. Predicted the ubiquitous presence of remote aerial drones.
"Dalek" (from Doctor Who)	TV series episode	2005	2012	The Doctor travels to 2012 in this episode, to a Museum of "Alien Artifacts". A throwaway line suggests that scientists have found the cure to the common cold.
The Dawn of All	Novel	1911	1973	Alternative version of Lord of the World in which the Church fares much better, and the world becomes Catholic, with the exception, at first, of Germany and the Far East.
The Day After	TV film	1983	c. 1989	Depicts the events of a devastating nuclear explosion, hinted to take place in 1989, in the small town of Lawrence, Kansas.
Daybreakers	Film	2009	2019	A world in which vampires have become the dominant species, and there is a shortage of human blood and humans in general.
Day of the Cheetah	Novel	1989	1996	The Cold War between the US and the Soviet Union is still extant; planes are now flown using brain-computer interface.
Dead End Drive-In	Film	1986	1995	Predicts the collapse of the global economy and the forced segregation of the unemployed.
Death Machine	Film	1994	2003	Cyborg super-soldier and mechanical Warbeast.
Death Note	Manga, anime	2003–2006	2009–2010	The second part of the story takes place in 2009–2010 (2012–2013 in the anime), when crime around the world has decreased significantly due to the mass killing of criminals by "Kira".
Death Race	Film	2008	2012	Remake of Death Race 2000, but set in a private prison.
Death Race 2000	Film	1975	2000	Predicts the collapse of the United States economy in 1979. The remaining form of entertainment is a transcontinental car race where innocent bystanders can be hit and killed for points.
"Death Ship" (from The Twilight Zone)	TV series episode	1963	1997	By 1997, Earth ships are exploring planets to see if they are suitable for colonization.
Demolition Man	Film	1993	1996	Main characters are cryogenically frozen in 1996 and wake up in 2032. Also predicted a "Great Earthquake" in 2010 that merged parts of Southern California.
Demon Lord 2099	Novel series, manga, anime	2021–present	2023	In January 2023, Earth merges with the fantasy world of Alneath in an event called the "Fantasion", resulting in Earth becoming populated with various fantasy creatures, as well as Earth's industry merging with Alneath's magic to create magical engineering known as "magineering". The rest of the series is set in the year 2099.
Deterrence	Film	1999	2008	Depicts Colin Powell as a former US president and Donald Trump as a candidate running for US president. Uday Hussein is the leader of a still-extant Ba'athist Iraq which invades Kuwait.
Destroy All Monsters	Film	1968	1999	All the world's kaiju are confined to an island called "Monsterland". Initially set "at the end of the 20th century" in the Japanese version, the date was changed to 1999 in the subsequent English-dubbed version.
Deus Ex Machina	Video game	1984	1994	By 1994, society operates under the strict control of "The Machine", a sentient computer system that also designs and artificially produces human beings.
D/Generation	Video game	1991	2021	On June 27, 2021, a courier with a personal jet pack is trapped in a genetics lab with a horde of rogue biogenic weapons.
Dino Crisis	Video game	1999	2009	A science experiment creates a rift in time that unleashes dinosaurs into the modern era.
Dinosaur War Izenborg	TV series	1977	1986	Talking dinosaurs return to conquer Earth. The US film edit, War of the Super Monsters, is set in the year 2000.
District 13	Film	2004	2010	A district in Paris is walled off from the rest of the city.
District 13: Ultimatum	Film	2009	2013	Sequel to District 13.
Do Androids Dream of Electric Sheep?	Novel	1968	1992, 2021	2021 in later editions. The inspiration for the film Blade Runner. Set in a post-nuclear future in which synthetic humans are employed as slave labour.
Dr. Bloodmoney, or How We Got Along After the Bomb	Novel	1964	1972, 1981 and 1988	A future history of the world, focused on northern California, following a series of nuclear events of uncertain provenance. The world has descended into a post-apocalyptic dystopia in which mutations are common, animals have evolved into higher intelligences, and telekinesis exists.
"Dreams Come True" (from the series finale of Glee)	TV series episode	2015	2020	In a flashforward to the 2020 United States presidential election, Geraldo Rivera congratulates Sue Sylvester for winning her re-election as Vice President of the United States under Jeb Bush as she states her intent to run for president in 2024.
Doctor Who	TV film	1996	1999–2000	The Doctor travels to December 30, 1999. The film is set between December 31, 1999, and January 1, 2000.
Doomsday Machine	Film	1972	1975	In 1975, Earth is completely destroyed by a doomsday device created by Red China. The last survivors are denied a place on Venus by the intelligent population.
Doomsday Plus Twelve	Novel	1984	1988–2000	In 1988, an incident in Saudi Arabia leads to nuclear war between the United States and the Soviet Union. A total of 120 million Americans are killed in the war.
The Door into Summer	Novel	1957	1970, 2000 and 2001	World War III broke out prior to 1970, with the United States eventually emerging as the victor. During the war, Washington, D.C. was destroyed and the capital was moved to Denver, Colorado. In 1970, household robots and the use of suspended animation are common. A Japanese film adaptation, set in 2025, was released in 2021.
Double Dragon	Film	1994	2007	An earthquake levels Los Angeles in 2000.
Droid	Film	1988	2020	In Los Angeles, the crime rate is up 200% by 2020.
Duke Nukem 3D	Video game	1996	2007	Set in the early 21st century. Calendars in-game suggest October–December 2007. Depicts shrink rays, jet packs, and bases on the Moon.
"The Duplicate Man" (from The Outer Limits)	TV series episode	1964	2025	Human cloning exists and alien life has been discovered.
"Dwellers in Silence" (from Dimension X)	Radio drama	1951	1987–2007	An adaptation of the 1948 short story by Ray Bradbury. On June 18, 1987, Earth was evacuated due to the fallout from a nuclear war. Humanity settled on Mars. By 2007, consideration was being given to repopulating Earth.
Earth Abides	Novel	1949	1971	The book opens in the then-contemporary period, in which a measles-like disease has wiped out most of the Earth's population. The second section, "The Year 22", takes place 22 years later in which a primitive community is being forged in Berkeley, California. The final section is set in an indeterminate future date, in which the protagonist of the novel, a college student at the beginning, is elderly.
Earth Defense Force 2017	Video game	2006	2017	In 2013, radio signals from space indicate the presence of extraterrestrial intelligence. Four years later, aliens invade.
Earth Defense Force 2025	Video game	2013	2025	Sequel to Earth Defense Force 2017. A second alien invasion occurs eight years after the last.
Earth Revisited	Novel	1893	1992	In 1992, the United States of America and the United States of Europe dominate world affairs and there are no more wars. The city of Columbia, formerly New York, is cleaner, better organized, more peaceful, healthier and generally better than before. Electrification (generated by solar power) and mechanization have brought widespread prosperity, and the extremes of wealth and poverty have been levelled. Government has assumed more responsibility: all land is owned by the state, and people lease the sites of their palatial houses.
"Easter 2016" (from Play for Tomorrow)	TV series episode	1982	2016	The centenary of the Easter Rising heightens the sectarian divisions in Northern Ireland's only integrated teacher training college.
Edge of Tomorrow	Film	2014	2020	The United Defense Force (UDF), a global military alliance established to combat an alien invasion of Continental Europe, finally achieves a victory over the Mimics at Verdun using newly developed mech-suits. Alien invasion starts in 2015.
The Eight Truths (from Doctor Who)	Audio drama	2009	2015	In 2015, a doomsday cult prophesies the coming of a rebel sun.
"Elegy" (from The Twilight Zone)	TV series episode	1960	1985	Much of the Earth was destroyed by a nuclear war in 1985.
Empire Earth	Video game	2001	2018	A civil war occurs in Russia.
"The End" (from Second Chance)	TV series episode	1987	2011	This episode correctly predicted that Colonel Muammar Gaddafi would die from multiple gunshot wounds in 2011.
"The End of the World" (from Roswell)	TV series episode	2000	2014	A character returns to the future to prevent his lover from falling in love with him, since their affair triggers their defeat in an alien invasion.
Endgame	Film	1983	2025	A nuclear holocaust has left New York City an irradiated wasteland inhabited by scavengers and telepathic mutants.
"The Enemy of the World" (from Doctor Who)	TV series episode	1967–1968	2018	In 2018, Earth is being ravaged by earthquakes and floods, causing widespread famine. Overpopulation exacerbates the problem. By this time, Earth is politically divided into zones overseen by the World Zone Authority, a successor to the United Nations. In the novel by Ian Marter, the story is set in 2030.
En L'An 2000	Postcards	1899–1910	2000	Series of postcards predicting what the world might be like in 2000. Depicts battles between dirigibles, radium-powered heaters, winged backpacks, personal aircraft, and phonograph journals.
"Enoch Soames"	Short story	1916	1997	By 1997, most words in the English language are spelled phonetically and many of them are pronounced differently than they were in 1897.
Eon	Novel	1985	2005	In 2005, the United States and a still-extant Soviet Union are on the brink of nuclear war.
Escape from L.A.	Film	1996	2000–2013	The film predicts a massive earthquake that floods the San Fernando Valley in 2000, rendering Los Angeles an island. The US capital is moved to Lynchburg, Virginia, after an evangelist from there becomes US president for life.
Escape from Mars	TV film	1999	2015–2016	The first crewed mission to Mars is launched on June 4, 2015.
Escape from New York	Film	1981	1997	Predicts a 400% rise in crime rate in 1988, prompting the remaking of Manhattan Island into a nationwide maximum security prison with no guards. In reality, crime rates in the US peaked in the film's release year of 1981, were about 20% lower in 1997, and have continued to drop ever since.
"Essence of Life" (from The Outer Limits)	TV series episode	1999	2014	In 2014, Earth is struggling to rebuild after a devastating plague.
"Epitaph Two: Return" (from Dollhouse)	TV series episode	2010	2020	Post-apocalypse in which most of humanity have had their minds wiped.
El Eternauta	Comic	1957–1959	1963	Depicts an alien invasion of Argentina.
Eternity Weeps (from Doctor Who)	Novel	1997	2003	In 2003, there is a colony on the Moon, there are border skirmishes between Turkey and Iran, and Bruce Springsteen is the US president.
Europe on the Brink: War with America	TV docudrama	1993	2013	North America and Europe become two rival federated superpowers that come close to war.
Event Horizon	Film	1997	2015	According to the opening title cards, the first permanent colony on the Moon is established by 2015.
Ever 17: The Out of Infinity	Video game	2002	2017	A cure for aging has been developed and a deadly virus outbreak occurs.
F.E.A.R.	Video game	2005	2025	Telepathy is a scientifically understood concept and telepathically controlled clones are employed by private military corporations.
F.E.A.R. 2: Project Origin	Video game	2009	2025	Follows on immediately from the first game.
Fahrenheit	Video game	2005	2009	Also known as Indigo Prophecy in North America; refers to the 2012 phenomenon and indigo children.
Fahrenheit 451	Novel	1953	After 1960	Early editions listed some time after 1960. Later editions showed after 1990 or 2022, where they started and won two atomic wars. Predicted regular use of earbud headphones, interactive television, video wall screens, robotic bank tellers, the demise of newspapers and the prevalent use of factoids. Also had the Mechanical Hound and technology for complete blood transfusions.
"Fear Her" (from Doctor Who)	TV series episode	2006	2012	This episode takes place during the 2012 Summer Olympics. Papua New Guinea surprise everyone in the shot put.
"The Final Solution: Slavery's Back In Effect"	Song	1992	1995	Depicts a racial civil war in 1995 sparked by the attempt of an unnamed president, whose vice-president is David Duke, to reinstate slavery.
The Fire Next Time	TV miniseries	1993	2017	In 2017, the greenhouse effect and global warming have resulted in widespread droughts, floods, hurricanes and the outbreak of fires which have wreaked devastation across the Earth.
Firebird 2015 AD	Film	1981	2015	By 2015, public ownership of motor vehicles and gasoline is punishable by summary execution.
First Spaceship on Venus	Film	1960	1985	The Gobi Desert is irrigated in 1985.
Fist of the North Star	Manga	1983–1988	199X	Mad Max-inspired post-nuclear wasteland in which superpowered martial artists fight each other for dominance. The world is described as having been devastated by a series of nuclear wars in the 1990s.
Five Nights at Freddy's 3	Video game	2015	c. 2023	The game takes place 30 years after the first Five Nights at Freddy's, which was set in the early 1990s (commonly believed to be around 1993). As of this game, there are advanced technologies for repelling and detecting animatronics.
Flashforward	Novel	1999	2009	The novel correctly predicted that the Large Hadron Collider would be operational by 2009 and that a pope named Benedict XVI would be in office in that year.
Flow My Tears, the Policeman Said	Novel	1974	1988	In 1988, the United States is a fascistic police state following a Second Civil War. The black population is nearly extinct and personal aircraft are common.
The Flying Torpedo	Film	1916	1921	In 1921, foreign spies steal a radio-controlled flying bomb and plan to use it to attack the United States as a prelude to invasion.
Folk Songs for the 21st Century	Album	1960	2001–2023	Nuclear war occurs in the 21st century.
Footfall	Novel	1985	1995–1996	The Soviet Union still exists and economically rivals the United States.
For Us, The Living: A Comedy of Customs	Novel	1939	1940–1970	Published in 2003. The novel correctly predicted that Adolf Hitler would commit suicide after his plans of conquest were defeated.
The Forge of God	Novel	1987	1996	An alien race destroys the Earth, but a small fragment of humanity is preserved by another alien race.
Fortress	Film	1992	2017	The US limits families to only one child.
The Fourth Protocol	Novel	1984	1986–1987	Correctly predicted that Margaret Thatcher would call a general election in the United Kingdom in June 1987.
"Franchise"	Short story	1955	2008	In 2008, the US president is elected via means of a computer, which calculates and determines the most suitable candidate for the post.
Frankenstein 1970	Film	1958	1970	The monster is created using an atomic reactor.
Freddy Fazbear's Pizzeria Simulator	Video game	2017	c. Mid-2020s	Sequel to Five Nights at Freddy's 3. The game's exact date is not specified but it likely takes place not long after Five Nights at Freddy's 3, in the mid-2020s. Depicts significant advancements in animatronic technology.
Freejack	Film	1992	2009	The main characters travel forward in time to November 2009. Time travel is commonplace and criminals travel back in time to kidnap victims for organ harvesting.
The Free Lunch	Novel	2001	2023	Set in a Disney World-like theme park which is troubled by time-travelling dwarves from the future.
Freeway Fighter	Gamebook	1985	2022	Mad Max-inspired future in which a virus decimates the world population in July 2022.
A Friend of the Earth	Novel	2000	2025	Climate change has devastated the environment, the world is overpopulated, and a pandemic has become prevalent.
Frontlines: Fuel of War	Video game	2008	2024	A bird flu outbreak and an energy crisis have caused the world to devolve into two hostile blocs.
Futurama	Exhibit	1939	1959	Predicted an automated highway system.
Future Boy Conan	Anime series	1978	2008	In July 2008, the Earth's continents are violently torn apart by a nuclear war, sinking most of them under the sea.
"Future-Drama" (The Simpsons episode)	TV series episode	2005	2013	Depicts Bart and Lisa Simpson as teenagers (with a reference to Lisa at age 12), while Homer and Marge have separated. By 2013, underwater homes and 3D holographic recording are possible.
Future Fear	Film	1997	2018	Predicted computers with AI voice assistants, a voice-activated record player, bars with automatic electronic bouncer systems, and hand-held laser-guns.
Future Hunters	Film	1986	2025	Set in post-apocalyptic world after a holocaust.
Future of a New China	Novel	1902	1903–1962	In 1962, China is a utopia, a world power, wealthy, Confucian and a constitutional monarchy.
Future Schlock	Film	1984	1990	As a result of the class wars in 1990, the middle class has mandated that people be middling or dull. Non-conformists are imprisoned in the inner city ghetto.
"Futureshock!" (from Totally Spies!)	TV series episode	2005	2025	Sam, Clover and Alex find a portable time machine while organizing Jerry's office and are accidentally transported 20 years into the future.
Futuresport	Film	1998	2025	Futuresport was created to reduce gang warfare. The North American Alliance and the Pan-Pacific Commonwealth are close to war.
Futureworld	Film	1976	1985	Sequel to Westworld and also set mainly in a theme park filled with androids.
Galactix	Video game	1991	2019	In 2019, amid devastating global climate change triggered by the final depletion of the Amazon rainforest, Earth is threatened with invasion and enslavement by a powerful force of alien cyborgs, known in-game as the "Xidus".
Gemini Rising	Film	2013	2023	A former Homeland Security agent is sent to a remote island where she investigates a retrieved alien spacecraft orbiting Neptune. Attempts to develop a mind-control serum.
Genesis II	TV pilot	1973	1979	The film opens in 1979, with the main character entering suspended animation. The bulk of the film (and the subsequent series, if it had been picked up) takes place in 2133.
Geostorm	Film	2017	2019–2024	In 2019 a weather control system is constructed to stop climate change. Five years later, a rogue faction weaponizes it.
"Gettysburg" (from The Outer Limits)	TV series episode	2000	2013	This episode correctly predicted that the first African-American President of the United States would be in office by 2013.
Give Me Liberty	Comic	1990	1995–2012	Martha Washington is born in Chicago on March 11, 1995.
Gley Lancer	Video game	1992	2025	Features a war between humans and an unknown alien race.
Godzilla: Final Wars	Film	2004	2020	In later years (around 2020), environmental disasters cause the appearance of giant monsters and superhumans, dubbed "mutants", who are then recruited into the Earth Defense Force (EDF) to battle the monsters.
The Golden Book of Springfield	Novel	1920	2018	In 2018, the residents of Springfield, Illinois are working to transform the city into a utopian paradise.
Golf in the Year 2000	Novel	1892	2000	A man falls asleep in 1892 and wakes up in the year 2000; trains are supersonic and golf and politics are the only activities not yet dominated by masculinized women.
Gorath	Film	1962	1976–1982	In 1979, a crewed spacecraft reaches Saturn. In 1980, scientists invent nuclear jet engines to attempt to move Earth away from a runaway planet on a collision course with it.
The Great Air Robbery	Film	1919	1925	Depicts air pirates.
The Great War in England in 1897	Novel	1894	1897	In 1897, France and Russia invade the UK and make several early advances, but the tide is turned when Germany comes to the UK's aid.
The Guardians	TV series	1971	1980s	Following economic chaos in the 1980s, democratic government in the United Kingdom has been overthrown in a bloodless coup, the Royal Family have fled into self-imposed exile and the UK is ruled autocratically by the Prime Minister Sir Timothy Hobson. Hobson is initially a pawn of a military officer by the name of Roger, who later becomes Minister of Defence.
Gunbuster	Anime	1988–1989	2023	In 2023, Earth has been in an interstellar war with the extraterrestrial Space Monsters. The main character is training to be a mecha pilot. Time-dilated space travel is possible.
The Guns of the South	Novel	1992	2014	The plot involves a gang of South African white supremacists who travel back in time to 1864 from 2014 to assist the rebelling Confederates in their war against the US.
Half-Life	Video game	1998	2000s	A "resonance cascade" at a top secret laboratory opens a gateway to another universe.
Half-Life: Opposing Force	Video game	1999	2000s	Set during the events of Half-Life.
Hardware	Film	1990	2000	Set on a post-apocalyptic Earth devastated by nuclear war. A scavenger discovers the head of a cyborg in the desert, and it later reanimates and goes on a murderous rampage.
Harley Davidson and the Marlboro Man	Film	1991	1996	A new designer drug, crystal dream, is in common use.
The Handmaid's Tale	Novel	1985	c. 1994	A misogynistic fanatical religious cult, called The Sons of Jacob, takes control of part of the United States in the 1990s and establishes a totalitarian regime, with the US now named "The Republic of Gilead" and ruthless towards women. The novel was adapted into a TV series in 2020.
"Hello Tomorrow" (from Dimension X)	Radio drama	1950	1991	In 1991, the Third Atomic War ended. The war left the surface of the Earth uninhabitable due to the high concentration of gamma rays in the atmosphere. The survivors moved underground and eventually established a civilization.
"Heroes and Villains" (from Only Fools and Horses)	TV series episode	1996	2026	Episode begins with the character Rodney Trotter having a nightmare set on November 2, 2026, in which his nephew Damien rules a dystopian world.
"The High Ground" (from Star Trek: The Next Generation)	TV series episode	1990	2024	Irish reunification occurs in this year, due, it is argued, to successful terrorist actions. This line was removed from all broadcasts in the UK and Ireland until 2006.
Highlander II: The Quickening	Film	1991	1999, 2024	In 1999, an electromagnetic shield is placed around the Earth to protect its ozone layer which was ruined by pollution. Twenty-five years later, a global corporation controls the shield.
High Treason	Film	1929	1940/50	Concerns the threat of a Second World War between the "United States of Europe" and the "Empire of the Atlantic States".
History of the Future/Historia przyszłości (Mickiewicz)	Novel	1829 (first version of the novel)	2000–2200	Unfinished novel written by Adam Mickiewicz. The first version of the novel from 1829 presented the world in the year 2000 which was dominated by China, it also shows Poland regaining independence, predicting women's rights worldwide, access to electronic devices, interplanetary communication, and contact with alien civilizations.
Hong Kong 97	Film	1994	1997	Depicts the 1997 transfer of sovereignty over Hong Kong.
Hong Kong 97	Video game	1995	1997	Set during the 1997 transfer of sovereignty over Hong Kong by the UK. The game correctly predicted that Deng Xiaoping would die in 1997.
House of the Dead III	Video game	2002	2019	Set 20 years after the events of the first game, during a zombie apocalypse.
"The Hungry Earth"/"Cold Blood" (from Doctor Who)	TV series episode	2010	2020	A group of Silurians emerge in a Welsh village.
Hunter Hunted	Video game	1996	2015	The world has been invaded, the human race exterminated, and the survivors enslaved and forced to fight other captive aliens.
"Hyperpilosity"	Short story	1938	1971	In the Great Change of 1971, a virus infects humanity and causes everyone to grow fur all over their bodies.
I Am Legend	Novel	1954	1976–1979	A deadly virus outbreak in 1975 transforms all but one of the human race into vampires.
I Am Legend	Film	2007	2009–2012	In 2009, an outbreak of a re-engineered measles virus kills 94% of the human populace and mutates 5% into zombie-like "Darkseekers". The story itself takes place three years later, in 2012, in a post-apocalyptic New York. The film predicted a Batman vs. Superman movie, with a planned release date of 2010 (in reality, a Batman vs. Superman film would not release until 2016).
"I, James Blunt"	Short story	1942	1944–1945	The United Kingdom is occupied by Nazi Germany in 1944 and 1945. St Paul's Cathedral is razed to make room for a Nazi Party headquarters and guerrilla warfare and any potential dissidence is suppressed through heavy policing.
I, Robot	Film	2004	2020	The USR robotics company is founded in 2020. The rest of the film is set in 2035.
Iceberg (from Doctor Who)	Novel	1993	2006	The tenth planet Cassius is discovered in 1994. The United Kingdom uses ecu as its currency. Earth's magnetic field reverses its polarity in 2006.
"The Illusion of Truth" (from Babylon 5)	TV series episode	1997	2018	In 2018, the first permanent lunar colony was established in the Sea of Tranquility.
Impossible Mission 2025	Video game	1994	2025	Cybernetic enhancements and sentient AI are commonplace.
In 1999	Play	1912	1999	Predicts a future in which traditional gender roles are reversed, with women going to work and men staying at home.
In the Days of the Comet	Novel	1906	After 1906	A comet lands in 1906, spreading a green fog. Starting in Book II, the narrator wakes up to find a more peaceful and rational 20th-century society.
In the Wet	Novel	1953	1983	Set partially in 1983 where a mixed-race Australian pilot assists a Royal Family who are unloved in a Socialist UK.
Infinite Jest	Novel	1996	c. 2002–2010	Starting sometime after 2001, each year is given a different sponsor name in a timeline called Subsidized Time, of which one of the years involves the year 2007. The story discusses this going into the ninth year of this format.
Innocent Life: A Futuristic Harvest Moon	Video game	2006	2022	In 2022, a sentient robot is built capable of taking care of crops/animals and interacting with people.
Insatiability	Novel	1930	2000	In 2000, Poland is overrun by the army of the final Mongol conquest. The nation becomes enslaved to the Chinese leader Murti Bing.
Invasion!	Comic	1977–1978	1990–1999	A fascist Russia invades the UK. The sequel series Savage, published from 2004 to the present, treats the events as alternate history.
The Invasion of 1910	Novel	1906	1910	In 1910, Germany launches an invasion of the UK. The German forces eventually reach London and occupy half the city. Although London is later liberated, the war is a stalemate as Germany has occupied Belgium and the Netherlands.
Invasion of the Sea	Novel	1905	1930s	In the 1930s, European engineers and their military escort seek to revive an actual 19th-century proposal to flood the Sahara desert with waters from the Mediterranean Sea to create an inland "Sahara Sea" for both commercial and military purposes.
The Iron Heel	Novel	1908	1910–1932	By 1910, the Socialist Party of America has become a major national party. An Oligarchy arises in the US from 1912 to 1932. Japan conquers East Asia and creates its own empire, India gains independence from the British Empire and Europe becomes socialist. Canada, Mexico, and Cuba form their own Oligarchies and are aligned with the United States.
Marvel Comics Earth-8410 stories	Comic	1984–2013 (Note: The last appearance of Earth-8410 was in Uncanny Avengers #14 in 2013.)	2020	The world is dominated by megacorporations, and virtual reality is the dominant form of entertainment. Appears in Machine Man (1984) #1–4, Death's Head (1988) #9–10, Death's Head II (1992) #1–3, WildThing (1993) #1–7, Iron Man 2020 (1994) #1, Astonishing Tales: Iron Man 2020 (2008) #1–4, and others.
Iron Sky	Film	2012	2018	Takes place during the administration of a Sarah Palin-like US president; Nazis have been hiding out on the Moon.
The Island	Film	2005	2019	Human clones are kept alive and on standby for organ harvesting.
Islands in the Net	Novel	1988	2023–2025	The U.S. and the Soviet Union are still around as superpowers, but companies are becoming more important, especially in Grenada and Luxembourg. Successfully predicted use of the internet, data havens, wearable computers / smart watches, drone warfare, end of Apartheid and end of the Cold War. Failed to predict: Soviet Union still around, one-way messaging as more important on the Net, South Africa renamed to Azania and expanding.
I Spit on Your Rave	Short film	2009	2018	A virus unleashed during the 2012 Summer Olympics initiates a zombie apocalypse.
It Can't Happen Here	Novel	1935	1936	Depicts Franklin D. Roosevelt's loss of the 1936 United States presidential election to a fascist populist.
It! The Terror from Beyond Space	Film	1958	1973	The first crewed mission to Mars returns to Earth in this year.
Jason X	Film	2001	2008–2010, 2024	Jason Voorhees is captured by the US government in 2008 for experimentation and escapes in 2010 before being cryogenically frozen. The rest of the film takes place in outer space in 2455. Ice hockey was outlawed in 2024.
The Jagged Orbit	Novel	1969	2014	Racial tension in the United States has reached such a point that racial enclaves now exist throughout the country and paranoia and unrest are stoked by arms dealers.
Jane's USAF	Video game	1999	2005	NATO and Russia are at war in 2005, with the latter invading Germany.
The Janus Conjunction (from Doctor Who)	Novel	1998	2011	San Francisco fell into the sea in 2011.
Jeremiah	TV series	2002–2004	2006	In 2006, a plague wiped out almost everyone over the age of thirteen.
Jet Set Radio Future	Video game	2002	2024	Tokyo is now "Tokyo-to" and is under the thumb of a repressive megacorporation.
Joe 90	TV series	1968–1981	2012–2013	From the producers of Thunderbirds. Follows a young secret agent who can "download" skills into his brain.
Johnny Mnemonic	Film	1995	2021	"Mnemonic couriers" carry sensitive information in their brains; the world is dominated by megacorporations. The world is in the midst of a pandemic for Nerve Attenuation Syndrome, an overexposure to radiation from information overload, and that a pharmaceutical company would withhold the cure for profit. Technologies depicted include: mass surveillance, videotelephony, electronic passports, full body scanners, haptic technology, brain implants. Also shown are a portable fax machine, an electronic whip that slices through flesh, and cybernetic dolphins.
"The Joining" (from The Outer Limits)	TV series episode	1998	2011–2012	Humanity has colonized Venus by 2011.
JoJo's Bizarre Adventure: Stone Ocean	Manga	1999–2003	2011–2012	The story is set in Florida in 2011. The protagonist is Jolyne Cujoh, who is the daughter of Jotaro Kujo. She was sentenced to 15 years in prison after being involved in a car accident and framed for murder. She is imprisoned at Green Dolphin Street Prison in Florida, nicknamed the "Aquarium", but her father decides to give Jolyne the powers that start the whole story.
A Journey in Other Worlds	Novel	1894	2000	By 2000, the United States is a superpower spanning multiple continents. By this time, solar power, air travel and space travel are commonplace. The Arctic Ocean is being dammed and Earth's axial tilt is being adjusted.
Journey into Space	Radio series	1953–1958	1965–1972	The rocket Luna lands on the Moon on October 22, 1965, and the first moonwalk is broadcast to Earth over the radio. In April 1971, a mission to Mars is launched from the Moon.
Journey to the Seventh Planet	Film	1962	2001	A UN rocket encounters a strange presence on the way to Uranus.
Just Imagine	Film	1930	1980	In 1980, personal airplanes are common in New York City, people have numbers instead of names, the US government will only permit people to marry if they are compatible, and babies are readily procurable from vending machines. A crewed mission to Mars is also depicted.
Kamikaze 1989	Film	1982	1989	West Germany is now a totalitarian regime.
Keitai Denjū Telefang	Video game	2000	2020	The player searches for Pokémon-esque creatures using mobile phone numbers, and they can be battled with against others.
Killing Time	Novel	2000	2023	Information technology has taken over the world. A staphylococcus plague wipes out 40 million people in 2006. In 2020, the first woman American President Emily Forrester is assassinated. The novel concerns a group of people who spread disinformation / conspiracy theories on the internet to undermine the government's influence by disinformation. Multiple global conflicts including the United States and Afghanistan, India and Pakistan, the Balkans. 2% of the population is in prison. The protagonists also employ an airship. As Daniel Zalewski of The New York Times writes: "First comes the '06 plague,' followed by 'the '07 financial crash,' the 'massacre of the Falun Gong cult in 2018' and the 'national E. coli outbreak of 2021.' Put these headlines together, and you've got yourself a dystopia!"
Knight Rider 2000	TV film	1991	2000	In 2000, Dan Quayle is President of the United States. The United States and the United Kingdom are fighting a war, codenamed Operation Tropical Storm, over Bermuda. Conventional handguns have been banned, with law enforcement carrying non-lethal "stun" pistols. Nationwide budget changes have resulted in the adoption of cryonic suspension over standard incarceration for convicted criminals.
Knights of God	TV series	1987	2000–2020	The Knights of God, a fascist and anti-Christian religious order, came to power in the UK during a brutal civil war in 2000. By 2020, they rule most of Britain.
"L.A. 2017" (from The Name of the Game)	TV series episode	1971	2017	After a worldwide ecological disaster, the population of Los Angeles moved underground due to the toxic atmosphere in 1989. In 2017, the United States is a megacorporation and a police state with its capital in Detroit, and at war with the UK.
La Foire aux immortels (The Nikopol Trilogy)	Graphic novel	1980	2023	Former astronaut Alcide Nikopol wakes up from a 30-year cryogenic sleep in space, teams up with Horus to fight the Paris dictatorship. Other Egyptian gods have been hovering over the city in a spaceship. Two nuclear wars have happened in the meantime. Sequels La Femme piège (1986), and Froid Équateur (1992), as well as a video game Nikopol: Secrets of the Immortals (2008) are also set around this time. The film adaptation Immortal, is set in the late 21st century.
The Lake at the End of the World	Novel	1988	2025	Set in the aftermath of a nuclear holocaust.
Land of the Giants	TV series	1968	1983	By 1983, sub-orbital flights are established.
Last and First Men	Novel	1930	Before 2018	The Anglo-French War occurs within a century of World War I.
The Last Chase	Film	1981	2011	In 2011, the United States was a police state.
The Last Days of American Crime	Film	2020	2024	An electronic signal is developed that prevents people from committing crimes.
The Last Man on Earth	Film	1924	1950	A plague of "masculitis" leaves just one fertile man left alive in a world of women.
The Last Man on Earth	Film	1964	1968	An adaptation of I Am Legend.
The Last Man on Earth	TV Series	2015–2018	2020	Set in late 2020, after an unnamed virus sweeps the world and kills most of the population. The timing of the show lines up closely with the COVID-19 pandemic, though the fictional virus depicted in the show is much more severe. The show's creator and star, Will Forte, later expressed regret at the unintentional similarities.
Last Rights	TV miniseries	2005	2009	In 2009, voter apathy is at an all-time high in the United Kingdom, and a new right-wing political party, The Democratic Consensus Party has just been voted into office. Unbeknownst to the public, the DCP has a sinister hidden agenda to do away with democracy and turn the country into a police state.
The Lathe of Heaven	Novel	1971	1998–2002	Set in a dystopian future wracked by global warming and overpopulation. The main character can retroactively alter reality, creating alternate realities, so many of the novel's predictions are undone, including a nuclear war in 1998.
Left 4 Dead	Video game	2008	2009	A disease known as the "Green Flu" breaks out in the United States, turning those afflicted into mindless zombies. Two weeks after the initial outbreak, the entire state of Pennsylvania is overrun, leaving four survivors to try to escape and reach safety.
The Legend of Bishin	Video game	1993	2020	Mount Fuji erupts catastrophically.
"Letters of Transit" (from Fringe)	TV series episode	2012	2015	Although most of the episode takes place in 2036, there is mention of a 2015 when the Observers took over the planet and initiated a purge of the populace.
Lifeforce	Film	1985	1986	The film depicts an alien invasion timed to the 1986 return of Halley's Comet.
The Light of Other Days	Novel	2000	2010–2019	Correctly predicted the United Kingdom deciding to withdraw from the European Union in the 2010s and the destruction of a Space Shuttle in the 2000s.
Lion-Maru G	Anime	2006	2011	Set in Neo-Kabukichō, a fictitious version of the real red-light district of Shinjuku, Tokyo. A wave of violent crime is being caused by a new contact lens drug called "Skull Eyes".
"Lisa's Wedding" (from The Simpsons)	TV series episode	1995	2010	The episode depicts Big Ben as a digital clock that has not yet been properly set (i.e., it still shows 12:00). Emotional robots are common and car engines make the same sound as the flying cars in The Jetsons. World War III apparently occurred at some point prior to the events of the episode, in which the United Kingdom saved the United States.
"A Logic Named Joe" (from Dimension X)	Radio drama	1950	1974	An adaptation of the 1946 short story by Murray Leinster. In 1974, networked personal computers known as "logics" can be found in almost every home.
"The Long Morrow" (from The Twilight Zone)	TV series episode	1964	1987–1988	In 1988, the astronaut Commander Douglas Stansfield is sent on an exploratory mission to a planetary system roughly 141 light-years from Earth.
Looking Backward	Novel	1888	2000	In 2000, the United States is a socialist utopia. The novel predicted debit cards/credit cards and shopping malls.
Looking Further Backward	Novel	1890	2023	Sequel to Looking Backward. Predicted that China had invaded a socialist America in 2020.
The Long Watch	Short story	1949	1999	In 1999, an international organization known as the Space Patrol has custody of all of Earth's remaining nuclear weapons. By this time, there is a moonbase.
Lord of the World	Novel	1907	1917-ca. 2000	Since the Labour Party took control of the British Government in 1917, the British Empire has been a single party state. The British royal family has been deposed, the House of Lords has been abolished, Oxford and Cambridge have been closed down and all their professors sent into internal exile in Ireland. The Anglican Communion was disestablished in 1929 and, like all forms of Protestantism, is almost extinct. The world now has only three main religious forces: Catholicism, secular humanism, and "the Eastern religions". The novel predicted widespread use of heavier-than-air craft.
Lords of the Deep	Film	1989	2020	By 2020, megacorporations have exhausted Earth's terrestrial resources and have begun the exploitation of the ocean floor.
Lost in Space	TV series	1965–1968	1997	Jupiter 2, the main ship of the series, was launched on October 16, 1997. By this time, Earth is severely overpopulated. The Robinsons were on a mission to colonize Alpha Centauri.
MAG: Massive Action Game	Video game	2010	2025	Private military corporations owned by megacorporations engage in global warfare.
Make Room! Make Room!	Novel	1966	1999	The world is overpopulated at 7 billion people, with 35 million people in New York City alone. The inspiration for the film Soylent Green (1973).
Malevil	Novel	1974	Late 20th century	Set in a French castle during the outbreak of a nuclear war. A film adaptation was released in 1981.
The Manchurian Candidate	Film	2004	2008	The film's plot revolves around the then-future 2008 United States presidential election.
"Man from 1997" (from Conflict)	TV series episode	1956	1997	By 1997, time travel is in common use. A librarian named B. O. Boyne from 1997 accidentally leaves an almanac from the future behind when he visits 1956.
Manhunter: New York	Video game	1988	2004	The world has been conquered by aliens in 2002. The sequel Manhunter: San Francisco is also set in 2004.
The Man Who Rocked the Earth	Novel	1915	1916	In 1916, World War I had an even more devastating effect than before. Germany conquered Holland, Denmark and Switzerland, Italy annexed Dalmatia and the Trentino and a "Slav republic" was formed which was composed of Hungary, Croatia, Bosnia, Herzegovina, Serbia, Romania, Montenegro, Albania and Bulgaria. The United States remained neutral, as did the newly formed United States of South America which was composed of the Spanish-speaking South American republics. The monarchs of Germany, Italy and the United Kingdom all voluntarily abdicated and those countries became republics.
The Man Who Sold the Moon	Novel	1951	1978	By 1978, the Moon has yet to be landed on and a self-described "robber baron" bluffs and schmoozes his way towards purchasing it, particularly through cuius est solum, eius est usque ad coelum et ad inferos and that the equatorial countries that the Moon passes over must have a claim to its land.
"Mars Is Heaven!"	Short story	1948	1960	In 1960, the first exploratory spaceship from Earth arrives on Mars. In the Dimension X radio adaptation in 1950, the first Earth ship XR-53 lands on Mars on April 20, 1987.
The Martian Chronicles	Short stories	1947–1950	1999–2026	Short stories about humans living on a terraformed Mars. A 1997 edition of the book advances all the dates by 31 years, thus running from 2030 to 2057.
Martian Gothic: Unification	Video game	2000	2019	Survival horror game set in the first colony on Mars.
"The Martian Death March" (from Dimension X)	Radio drama	1951	1997	By 1997, humanity has colonized Mars.
Max Headroom: 20 Minutes into the Future	TV movie	1985	2004–2006	In a dystopian cyberpunk Britain, Network 23's top rated investigative reporter Edison Carter (Matt Frewer) must navigate a dangerous path through corporate greed and hired goons to expose a dark secret at the very top of his own network. No explicit date is given on-screen, but Bryce Lynch's employee file reveals he was born on October 7, 1988. Lynch's apparent age of 16 to 18 indicates a setting of between 2004 and 2006.
Mega Man 2	Video game	1988	200X	By the 2000s, artificially intelligent robots are common.
Memoirs of the Twentieth Century	Novel	1733	1997–1998	Predicts the dominance of Catholicism in the 20th century. The novel correctly predicted that the Ottoman Empire would collapse in the 20th century and that a British monarch named George VI would reign during that century.
Memory Run	Film	1995	2015	The world is a corporate republic, and body transplants are in beta.
Men into Space	TV series	1959–1960	c. 1975–1985	The series was not set in a specific era, but clues throughout the scripts indicated that it took place in the mid-1970s to mid-1980s, with the first Moon landing somewhere around 1975.
Men Must Fight	Film	1933	1940	Predicts a Second World War between the United States and "Eurasia".
Metal Fırtına	Novel	2004	2007	Depicts a war between the United States and Turkey that culminates in Turkish terrorists detonating a nuclear bomb in Washington, D.C.
Metal Gear	Video game	1987	19XX	19XX is later identified as 1995. Walking mechs, androids and human cloning are routine.
Metal Gear 2: Solid Snake	Video game	1990	1999	Set four years after the original Metal Gear.
Metal Gear Solid	Video game	1998	2005	In 2005, terrorists seize control of a military nuclear storage base in Alaska. Depicts a giant mech called "Metal Gear", rail guns, cyborg ninjas, optical camouflage, nanomachines and high frequency swords.
Metal Gear Solid 2: Sons of Liberty	Video game	2001	2007–2009	The introduction mission is set in 2007, but the rest of the game is set in 2009. Reanimated corpses are placed in cybernetic exoskeletons. Portable rail guns exist. The President of the United States is a clone who resigns and forms a paramilitary group.
Metal Gear Solid 4: Guns of the Patriots	Video game	2008	2014	Set nine years after the events of the original Metal Gear Solid and five years after Sons of Liberty. The world is in perpetual war called "War Economy". Battlefields are safer with a system of information and nanomachines. PMCs are commonplace and fight in wars instead of armies. A new camouflage called "Octocamo" is developed by DARPA.
Metal Gear Rising: Revengeance	Video game	2013	2018	Set in the same war-torn future as Guns of the Patriots. Cyborgs are now commonplace despite being discriminated, most skyscrapers in Denver are more than 1 km high, holograms are commonplace, prototyping is done with virtual simulation, and real AI was developed.
Metro 2033	Novel	2002	2013	In the prologue, a nuclear war happens in which Moscow is nuked, and the surviving population ends up fleeing underground to the city's Metro system, eventually splitting into separate factions. The main plot is set in 2033.
México 2000	Film	1983	2000	By 2000, Mexico is a utopian society.
"Miami 2017 (Seen the Lights Go Out on Broadway)"	Song	1976	2017	In the story of this post-apocalyptic song by Billy Joel, a man moves to Miami after New York City is devastated by a disaster in 2017.
"Millennium" (from My Life and Times)	TV series episode	1991	1999–2000	In 1999, there are numerous doomsday conspiracy theories that the world will end in 2000.
"Millennium" (from The X-Files)	TV series episode	1999	1999–2000	Depicts New Year's Eve 1999 and New Year's Day 2000. References the Y2K phenomenon.
"The Mind of Simon Foster" (from The Twilight Zone)	TV series episode	1989	1999	In 1999, the United States is experiencing a severe economic depression.
Mirrorman	TV series	1971–1972	1980	In 1980, an evil alien race known simply as the Invaders are about to take over the Earth, using assorted daikaiju (giant monsters) and other fiendish plots.
Mission to Mars	Film	2000	2020	The crewed Mars I mission is launched.
Moon Child	Film	2003	2014–2025	Predicted collapse of Japan's economy where citizens have to move to China.
Moon Zero Two	Film	1969	2021	Set on a moonbase. The date is seen in the arrival gate as May 9, 2021. Flights to Mars and Venus are commonplace.
Moonbase Alpha	Video game	2010	2025	Set on a moonbase on the Moon's south pole.
Moonbase 3	TV series	1973	2003	By 2003, five world powers have established colonies on the Moon: the United States (Moonbase 1), the Soviet Union (Moonbase 2), Europe (Moonbase 3), China (Moonbase 4) and Brazil (Moonbase 5). The European Moonbase 3 was established in 1995.
Moondraam Ullaga Por	Film	2016	2025	Depicts a war between India and China in 2025.
Moving the Mountain	Novel	1911	1920–1940	In 1920, the United States adopted a system of economics described as being "beyond Socialism", a strain of nationalism that answered all the questions posed by socialism without actually being socialist, renovating its society and culture. In 1940, the US is a country with no poverty or prostitution, "no labor problem – no color problem – no sex problem – almost no disease – very little accident – practically no fires", a place in which "the only kind of prison left is called a quarantine", where problems of deforestation and soil erosion are being remedied, and in which "no one needs to work over two hours a day and most people work four...."
Nano Breaker	Video game	2005	2021	The United States has established an island facility called Nanomachine Island to research and develop nanotechnology for implementation in military and civilian life.
Native Tongue	Novel	1984	1991	The novel is set in the 22nd century, but after the United States repealed women's rights in 1991.
Negadon: The Monster from Mars	Short film	2005	2025	Earth sends an expedition to Mars.
NeoGeo Battle Coliseum	Video game	2005	2017	The Federal Government and the WAREZ Conglomerate vie for world domination via the Battle Colosseum event.
Neon Genesis Evangelion	Anime series	1995	2015	Children in giant mechas fight giant alien monsters. Followed by a clip show film, Neon Genesis Evangelion: Death & Rebirth and a direct film sequel, The End of Evangelion.
"The Neutral Zone" (from Star Trek: The Next Generation)	TV series episode	1988	1994	Cryonics had become very popular and a cryonic satellite was launched into Earth orbit. The remastered version of this episode places these events in 1994.
Never 7: The End of Infinity	Video game	2000	2019	Visual novel that takes place during a time travel experiment.
The New Barbarians	Film	1983	2019	Post-apocalyptic film where two gangs clash over whether to destroy settlers or defend them. Inspired by the Mad Max films.
News from Nowhere	Novel	1890	1952	In 1952, a violent revolution in the United Kingdom overthrew capitalism, which eventually resulted in the creation of a socialist utopia.
Night of Power	Novel	1985	1996	In 1996, there is a race war in New York City.
Night Probe!	Novel	1981	1989	In 1989, the world is in the throes of an energy crunch and the United States is on the brink of financial disaster.
Nineteen Ninety-Four	Radio series	1985	1994	Household appliances are artificially intelligent. Household robots are common if ineffective. Government departments are privatised. Job interviews are predetermined by publicly available romantic and voting preferences. Jobs are gamified. The Lake District is underwater after a meteorite strike. Floppy disks are still in use.
The Ninja Warriors	Video game	1987	1993	In 1993, the US president declares himself dictator and institutes martial law.
"No Contact" (from Dimension X)	Radio drama	1950	1962–1987	In 1962, Louis Thorson became the first man to walk on the Moon. By 1972, travel to the Moon and other planets in the Solar System was routine. By 1982, humanity was exploring other parts of the galaxy.
No Escape	Film	1994	2022	Set on a private prison on a former island resort.
The Noah's Ark Principle	Film	1984	1997	In 1997, all weapons of mass destruction have been decommissioned. There is a European-American weather control space station FLORIDA ARKLAB in orbit of Earth.
North Atlantic '86	Video game	1983	1986	Warsaw Pact forces have successfully overrun most of Western Europe by the end of August 1986.
"Number 12 Looks Just Like You" (from The Twilight Zone)	TV series episode	1964	2000	Set in a world in which people can purchase their adult bodies, but everyone goes for a small number of popular options. Rod Serling opens the episode stating, "For want of a better estimate, let's call it the year 2000".
The Old Grey Hare (from Looney Tunes)	Cartoon short	1944	2000	The Voice of God (Mel Blanc) transports Elmer Fudd through time to the (then) far-off future year of 2000, when "smellevision" has replaced television and "Bing Crosby's horse still hasn't come in yet".
"The Old Man in the Cave" (from The Twilight Zone)	TV series episode	1963	1974	This episode takes place in 1974, ten years after the United States has been devastated by a nuclear war.
"The Old Man in the Cave" (from The Twilight Zone)	TV series episode	1963	1974	This episode takes place in 1974, ten years after the United States has been devastated by a nuclear war.
Omega Cop	Film	1990	1999	Society all but collapses after Earth is devastated by a series of solar flares.
The Omega Man	Film	1971	1977	An adaptation of I Am Legend.
Omega Race	Video game	1981	2003	By 2003, space combat using lasers is routine.
On the Beach	Novel	1957	1963	The northern hemisphere has been devastated by World War III; the inhabitants of the southern hemisphere await the arrival of fallout.
On the Beach	Film	1959	1964	The film of the novel.
On the Beach	Film	2000	2007	Predicts a nuclear war between the United States and China over Taiwan that renders the Northern Hemisphere uninhabitable.
"On Thursday We Leave for Home" (from The Twilight Zone)	TV series episode	1963	1991–2021	In 1991, people fled from Earth due to perpetual war, and set out to colonize another planet. In 2021, a rescue ship arrives to take them home.
"One Way to the Moon" (from The Time Tunnel)	TV series episode	1966	1978	The first crewed mission to Mars is launched in 1978.
Outcast	Video game	1999	2007	Interdimensional travel is invented.
"The Outer Limit" (from Dimension X)	Radio drama	1950	1965	On April 10, 1965, the United States is testing a cosmic ray bomb which is many times more powerful than a nuclear bomb. By this time, 20 other countries have nuclear weaponry. Videophones called vidiscreens are widely used.
OutRun 2019	Video game	1993	2019	Racing game involving rocket-powered cars.
Outside	Album	1995	1999	An album by David Bowie which tells a nonlinear murder mystery in 1999, when murder and the mutilation of corpses is an accepted art form.
The Outward Urge	Novel	1959	1994–2194	A future history from 1994 to 2194 at 50-year intervals. Depicts a missile attack on a British space station in 1994.
Pacific Rim	Film	2013	2020–2025	In 2013, a rift to another dimension unleashes gigantic creatures onto the Earth, which humans fight with mechas. Whether this film qualifies as a prediction or alternate future depends on whether the rift opens before or after July 2013.
Parable of the Sower	Novel	1993	2024–2027	By 2024, society has destabilised due to climate change and wealth inequality. Accurately predicted wildfires in Los Angeles in early 2025.
Parasite	Film	1982	1992	Post-apocalyptic future in which Earth is run by a class called Merchants.
Paris in the Twentieth Century	Novel	1863	1960	Written in 1863 and published in 1994. Predicted gas-powered cars (and gas stations), fax machines, electric street lighting, maglev trains, the record industry, the internet, WMDs and many other things.
"Patient Zero" (from The Outer Limits)	TV series episode	2001	2015	By 2015, a devastating plague has wiped out more than three billion people worldwide.
"Past Tense" (from Star Trek: Deep Space Nine)	TV series episode	1995	2024	Most US cities are home to "sanctuary districts"; designated regions for homeless and destitute that have proliferated as wealth inequality increases.
Patlabor	OVA	1988–1989	1998–2002	Robots called "Labors" are integrated into society. The film adaptation, Patlabor: The Movie, is set in 1999.
The Peace Keepers	Video game	1993	2015	After the "economic wars" of 2011, the Deutschland Moldavia corporation rules most of the world.
Perfect Dark (Game Boy Color)	Video game	2000	2022	Terrorists pay for cybernetic enhancements. Alien contact has been made.
Perfect Dark	Video game	2010	2023	Two alien races involved in an interstellar war join rival companies on Earth. Predicted: Anti-gravity devices, holographics, first sentient artificial intelligence computer.
Perfect Dark: Initial Vector	Novel	2006	2016, 2020	The world is dominated by megacorporations. Canada is quarantined after a deadly flu epidemic in 2016.
Perfect Dark Zero	Video game	2005	2020	A large percentage of the world is controlled by corporations.
Perry Rhodan, "The Third Power" story arc	Novel series	1961–1962	1971–1975	The first moon landing discovers a crashed alien ship, and, after dealing with its occupant, returns alien technology to Earth, the desire for which nearly triggers a world war.
The Phantom Planet	Film	1961	1980	The United States has bases on the moon.
Philip Dru: Administrator	Novel	1912	1920–1935	Philip Dru leads the democratic western United States in the Second American Civil War against the plutocratic East. After becoming a benevolent dictator and an acclaimed leader, he steps down, having restored justice and democracy.
Phoenix Point	Video game	2019	2022	An alien virus mutates all life on Earth.
"Pilot" (from Odyssey 5)	TV series episode	2002	2007	Earth is destroyed on August 7, 2007.
Plague 99	Novel	1989	1999	In 1999, the majority of the population of London is wiped out by a plague in a matter of weeks.
Platinumhugen Ordian	Anime	2000	2020	Japanese high school students can pilot Mechas.
Play for Tomorrow	TV series	1982	1999	BBC series offering many alternate views of the future, several set in 1999: "Bright Eyes": The UK is in the middle of a Europe-wide war.; "The Nuclear Family": The British government is on a nuclear war footing in the hope of advancing technological development. A father takes his family on a working holiday, cleaning floors in an underwater missile base.; "Shades": Youths in a tower block are kept passive by pornographic virtual reality.
Policenauts	Video game	1994	2010–2013	Beyond Coast, mankind's first fully functional space colony, is completed. Three years later, five policemen from Earth are chosen to enforce the law among the first wave of general immigrants, becoming the titular Policenauts. The main story is set 27 years later in 2040, when one of the original Policenauts, Jonathan Ingram, is now working as a detective in Old Los Angeles after an accident during a space walking experiment left him stranded in space for 24 years in suspended animation, preserving his youth.
Police Quest: SWAT 2	Video game	1998	1999	Terrorists battle police on the streets of Los Angeles.
Portal	Video game	2007	c. 2010	Set inside an underground testing facility controlled by a sentient AI.
The Postman	Film	1997	2013	Sixteen-plus years after unspecified apocalyptic events, US society has collapsed due to racially motivated attacks by a fanatical militia-like group, culminating in nuclear war and followed by plagues, that collectively left a huge impact on civilization and erased most technology.
"The Potters of Firsk" (from Dimension X)	Radio drama	1950	1992	By 1992, humanity has established colonies on other planets.
Power Rangers S.P.D.	TV series	2005	2025	Humans and aliens coexist on Earth.
Predator 2	Film	1990	1997	Depicts a turf war between Jamaican and Colombian drug cartels in Los Angeles in 1997.
"Preview of the War We Do Not Want"	Novella	1951	1952–1960	World War III breaks out on May 10, 1952. After three years of fighting, the United Nations emerges victorious over the Soviet Union, which is subsequently occupied.
Prince of Darkness	Film	1987	1999	Characters in the present (1987) share a recurring dream which is a transmission from the future (1999), in which the apocalypse is occurring.
Privilege	Film	1967	1970s	A rock singer becomes the figurehead of a fascist UK government.
Project Moonbase	Film	1953	1970	People can live on the Moon.
Prophecies of Nostradamus	Film	1974	1999	Examines an interpretation of the prophecies of Nostradamus; in particular Quatrain 10–72: "In the year 1999 and seven months from the skies will come the great king of terror".
Psychic Force and Psychic Force 2012	Video game	1995 1998	2010 2012	Set in a future where "phychiccers" are shunned by normal humans.
The Psychotechnic League	Novel series	1949–1957	1958	Future history series by Poul Anderson concerning the world rebuilding itself after a nuclear conflict in 1958.
The Puma Blues	Comic	1986–1989	1995–2002	Predicted a nuclear detonation in 1995. Time skip in issue No. 21 to 2002.
The Puppet Masters	Novel	1951	2007 and later	The US and the Soviet Union engaged in a limited nuclear war, but are still hostile. The Sino-Soviet split never happened and China is part of the Soviet Bloc. Flying cars and interplanetary travel are commonplace.
The Purge	Film	2013	2014–2022	In 2014, an economic collapse presages the election of a totalitarian government. By 2022, the US celebrates an annual national holiday known as "the Purge", during which all crime, including murder, are decriminalized for a 12-hour period.
The Purge: Anarchy	Film	2014	2023	The United States is a dystopian country ruled by a totalitarian government known as the "New Founding Fathers". The Purge is being used to save the country's collapsing economy. Most of the film concerns activities near the Sixth Purge on March 21, 2023.
Quantum Leap	TV series	1989–1993	1995–1999	Sam Beckett is in 1995 when he starts leaping. Other events in the TV series bring the present time to 1999.
"Quarantine" (from The Twilight Zone)	TV series episode	1986	2023	Matthew Forman is put into cold sleep on June 18, 2023, in the hopes that his inoperable cancer can be cured in the future. The majority of the episode takes place in 2347.
Queen of Blood	Film	1966	1990	In 1990, a spaceship from Mars crash-lands on Earth.
Queen of Outer Space	Film	1958	1985	Venus is inhabited by women.
"The Queer Story of Brownlow's Newspaper"	Short story	1932	1971	A newspaper dated November 10, 1971, features references to lower birth rates, an emphasis on psychological motivation in fiction, geothermal energy, the extinction of gorillas and a world government. By 1971, there is also a simplified spelling of English – the name of the newspaper is the Even Standard as opposed to the Evening Standard – and a 13-month reformed calendar.
A Quiet Place	Film	2018	2020	Extraterrestrial sightless creatures annihilate most of Earth's human and animal life.
Radioactive Dreams	Film	1985	2011	Nuclear war breaks out in 1996, placing the two main characters in a bunker for 15 years.
Raid 2020	Video game	1989	2020	The police force is almost completely corrupt.
Rainbows End	Novel	2006	2025	Alzheimer's disease has been cured and augmented reality is commonplace.
Rats: Night of Terror	Film	1984	2015	A nuclear holocaust occurs in 2015.
Raving Rabbids: Travel in Time	Video game	2010	2012	The modern era is depicted as "2012" by the Time Washing Machine.
Real Steel	Film	2011	2020	Human boxers are replaced by robots.
Rebuild of Evangelion	Film series	2007–2009	2015	Reboot of Neon Genesis Evangelion. The first two films take place starting in 2015.
Reign of Fire	Film	2002	2008 and 2020	The introductory part of the film, in which dragons are found under London, is set in 2008. The remainder of the film is set in 2020, in a post-apocalyptic Earth overrun with dragons.
The Reign of King George VI, 1900–1925	Novel	1763	1900–1925	Predicts the continued rule of the House of Hanover into the 20th century and the British conquest of France.
"The Repairer of Reputations"	Short story	1895	1920	This short story, part of the weird fiction book The King in Yellow, is set in a future New York City where suicide has been legalized and facilitated by the American government, with 'lethal chambers' that provide a painless death readily available to the public. While the United States is a prosperous and militarily strong nation, much of Europe has become anarchic.
Repo Men	Film	2010	2025	Bio-mechanical organs have been invented.
Resiklo	Film	2007	2021	Earth is invaded by insect-like beings.
"Resurrection" (from The Outer Limits)	TV series episode	1996	1997–2009	On July 24, 1997, humanity destroyed itself (as well as all other mammals) in a biological war in what became known as the Day of Silence or the Biocaust. Only a few hundred androids were left to populate the Earth. In 2009, two androids created a human, Cain, from unaffected DNA samples to lead the Second Coming of humankind.
Revengers Tragedy	Film	2002	2011	Science fiction adaptation of The Revenger's Tragedy set in a post-apocalyptic Great Britain that has been devastated by a natural disaster.
Revolution X	Video game	1994	1996	Takes place in a dystopian future where music, television and video games are banned, and the rock band Aerosmith is kidnapped.
Rideback	Manga, Anime	2003–2008 (manga), 2009 (anime)	2020 (manga), 2025 (anime)	The manga is set in 2020 while the anime is set in 2025.
Rig 'n' Roll	Video game	2010	2014	California has declared independence.
Riki-Oh: The Story of Ricky	Film	1991	2001	Loose Hong Konger adaptation of the Riki-Oh manga. By 2001, all prisons and other correctional facilities have been handed over to the private industry. A nuclear war devastated the planet and the economy, leading to high crime rates.
Ring Raiders	Cartoon series	1989	1998	Depicts a future war between time traveling airmen.
"The Roads Must Roll"	Short story	1940	1945–1960	In 1950, the first mechanized road was built between Cincinnati and Cleveland.
"Robbie" from I, Robot	Short story	1939	1982, 1996	By 1982 (1996 in later reprints), household robots are common. The revised version of the story states the birth year of Susan Calvin as 1982.
RoboCop	TV series	1994	2005	In 2005, robotic policemen patrol the streets of Detroit, Michigan.
Robotics;Notes	Video game	2012	2019	Visual novel about a boy trying to construct a mecha.
RobotWar	Video game	1981	2002	Human soldiers have been replaced by military robots.
"Future Schlock" (from Rocko's Modern Life)	TV series episode	1996	2013	In a Star Trek-esque 2010s, Filburt's children ask him the meaning of a banana which they found in a refrigerator from 1996. At the end of the episode, Rocko, Spunky, Heffer and Filburt all get blasted off into space in Rocko's house and would return to O-Town in a retconned 2016, in the 2019 special Rocko's Modern Life: Static Cling.
Rollerball	Film	1975	2018	By 2018, the world is a corporate dictatorship. American football is no longer an active sport and rollerball is the only sport shown on cable television. Books are replaced by summaries on computers. Households have about four television monitors in a room. People are required to stay home to watch sports. The reboot is set only three years into its future and is regarded more as contemporary.
Roujin Z	Film	1991	2020	Set in early 21st-century Japan (c. 2020). A group of scientists and hospital administrators, under the direction of the Ministry of Public Welfare, have developed the Z-001: a computerized hospital bed with robotic features.
"Runaround"	Short story	1942	2005–2015	By 2005, humanity has established mining stations on Mercury.
Runaway	Film	1984	1991	Set in a future in which household robots are commonplace. Predicted domestic robots, video mail, social media, the Internet, voice-activated computers, facial recognition, retinal identification, camera drones, smart bullets, tablet PCs, wireless headsets, and that police officers would use semi-automatic pistols as sidearms (in 1984, most police officers used revolvers). The year is inferred from the main character's age (35) and birthdate (1956).
The Running Man	Novel	1982	2025	The world economy is in shambles and the United States has become a totalitarian dystopia.
The Running Man	Film	1987	2017–2019	Predicts an economic collapse and totalitarian takeover of the US in 2017. The film itself takes place in 2019. Refers to the "Great Quake of '97".
R. U. R. (Rossum's Universal Robots)	Play	1921	c. 2000	The synthetic protoplasm that makes robots a possibility is discovered in 1932. The play itself takes place some decades after that. One of the earliest, if not the earliest, example of an AI takeover in fiction. The 1948 BBC adaptation takes place from 1980 to 1990.
Saints Row 2	Video game	2008	c. 2011	Set five years after the first Saints Row game, which took place in 2006.
Saints Row: The Third	Video game	2011	c. 2015	Sequel to Saints Row 2, taking place several years later.
Saints Row IV	Video game	2013	c. 2015 and 2020	A terrorist attack on the United States is narrowly thwarted. Five years later, Earth is invaded and subsequently destroyed by aliens. A small number of survivors, including the President of the United States, are abducted and placed in a virtual world, from which they escape before battling and defeating the aliens.
Saints Row: Gat out of Hell	Video game	2015	c. 2020	Standalone expansion to Saints Row IV. One of the possible endings sees the universe being reset by God; Earth is recreated and no one remembers their previous lives.
Sealab 2020	TV series	1972	2020	The opening narration predicts that underwater sea labs would be able to house 250 people.
Sealab 2021	TV series	2000	2021	Redubbed parody of Sealab 2020.
seaQuest DSV	TV series	1993–1996	2015–2018	By 2018, the ocean floor has been colonised. The dolphin Darwin can communicate with humans with a translation device. The first crewed mission to Mars was launched in 2015 and returned to Earth in 2018.
A Scanner Darkly	Novel	1977	1994	A narcotics agent wears a "scramble suit" that hides his identity and uses video to spy on a drug-using household. Made into a film in 2006.
Sci-Fighters	Film	1996	2009	A convict escapes from the Moon and returns to Earth on the run, carrying a deadly virus.
The Secret People	Novel	1935	1964	Correctly predicts Queen Elizabeth II being named as the reigning monarch of the United Kingdom, although at the time of the novel's publication, she was only third in the line of succession.
Seeking a Friend for the End of the World	Film	2012	2021	An asteroid collides with Earth. The date of the final published newspaper is "March 21, 2021".
Segagaga	Video game	2001	2025	Depicts Sega with having a 3% share of the console market with the other 97% being owned by their rival DOGMA.
Sekirei	Manga, Anime	2004	2020	Takes place in Tokyo of the "New Eastern Imperial Capital", where "Sekirei" (women fighters) battle to determine the fate of the world.
Senran Kagura	Video game	2011	2020	Female ninjas are commonplace and fight off evil.
The Sentinel	Short story	1951	1996	An expedition to Mare Crisium unearths an alien artifact. The inspiration for 2001: A Space Odyssey.
The Sentinels of the New Dawn (from Doctor Who)	Audio drama	2011	2014	This audio drama correctly predicted that there would be a widespread Ebola epidemic in 2014.
Servant of the People	TV Series	2015–2019	2019–2023	By 2020, Vladimir Putin is overthrown as President of Russia, and by 2023, Ukraine is balkanized into many states, eventually reuniting by the end of that same year.
Seven Days in May	Film	1964	1974	Military leaders opposed to a treaty with the Soviet Union plot a coup to take over the United States government.
Sexmission	Film	1984	1991	By 1991, suspended animation has been perfected. Begins in 1991, when the main characters enter hibernation, before awakening in 2044.
Shadowrun	Roleplaying game	1989	2021	On April 30, 2021, ten percent of the world's population suddenly transform into new racial types, resulting in the ork and troll races.
The Shadows of Avalon (from Doctor Who)	Novel	2000	2012	By 2012, the United Kingdom has a king.
Shank	Film	2010	2015	London has fallen under the influence and reign of gangs.
The Shape of Things to Come	Novel	1933	1933–2017	Contains several books covering future periods including an extensive Second World War, a dictatorship and other dystopian ideas.
Shattered Union	Video game	2005	2008–2014	Set in a future in which the United States has split into warring factions.
Shooting War	Comic	2006	2011	In 2011, US President John McCain is aggressively pursuing the war on terror while taking Prozac.
Silent Mobius	Anime	1998	2023	Depicts a group of all-female police officers protecting Tokyo from an invasion of extra-dimensional creatures called Lucifer Hawks. The manga was started in 1989 and is set in 2024, but the anime starts with an episode set in 2023.
SimCity	Video game	1989	2010	Boston suffers a nuclear meltdown in January 2010.
SimCity 2000	Video game	1993	1993–2007	Malibu is affected by wildfires in November 1993, Chicago by November 1999 suffers from high pollution, a giant monster ravages Hollywood in January 2001, and New York City's Manhattan is affected by a nuclear meltdown in 2007.
SimCity 3000	Video game	1999	2020	Microwave power plants are invented.
Sin and Punishment	Video game	2000	2007	In 2007, humanity is undergoing severe global famine. Scientists build bionic creatures to help grow food, but the creatures eventually revolt against them and start a war.
Sire	Novel	1991	1999	In 1999, France restores the monarchy and the 18-year-old Philippe Pharamond de Bourbon assumes the throne.
The 6th Day	Film	2000	2015	By 2015, the creation of duplicate humans, including memory, physique and age, is possible, but illegal.
The Sky Pirate	Novel	1909	1930s	Several years prior to 1939, France and the UK fought each other in a war in which aircraft were prominently used.
Slaughterhouse-Five	Novel	1969	1976	Partially set in a future in which a "Balkanized" United States has been partitioned into twenty separate countries "so that it will never again be a threat to world peace". Chicago has been completely destroyed and rebuilt after being "hydrogen-bombed by angry Chinamen". The novel's protagonist Billy Pilgrim is assassinated with a laser gun.
Smash TV	Video game	1990	1999	In 1999, violent reality TV shows are popular with audiences. The contestants fight each other, often to their deaths.
Snatcher	Video game	1988	1991 (Japanese), 1996 (English)	Predicts the deaths of 80% of the world's population due to a biological hazard in the fictional city of Chernoton, Russia. The original Japanese story depicts this event occurring on June 6, 1991, but the later-released English localization moves the year to 1996. The main story is set 51 years later on the manmade island of Neo Kobe City, where the titular race of androids are secretly killing members of the high echelon of society and disguising themselves as their victims. Inspired by Blade Runner and Akira.
"Sneak Attack" (from Tales of Tomorrow)	TV series episode	1951	1960	In 1960, an unnamed foreign power launches 22 robot airplanes carrying hetrodyne bombs and threatens to detonate them in the major cities of the United States unless the US president surrenders the entire nation to this foreign power. Denver is destroyed, resulting in the deaths of 46,000 people.
Snow Crash	Novel	1992	2000s	California has split into two, hyper-Libertarian independent republics in which no law applies nationwide. Guard dogs are augmented cyborgs. Predicted virtual worlds and Google Earth.
A Sojourn in the City of Amalgamation, in the Year of Our Lord, 19--	Novel	1835	20th century	An American anti-abolitionist satire set in a future city where racial mixing of blacks and whites is socially mandatory. Correctly predicts the abolition of slavery in the US by the 20th century.
Soldiers of Anarchy	Video game	2002	2015	A deadly virus wiped out most of the human population in 2010.
Songbird	Film	2020	2024	A more deadly variant of COVID-19 leads to multi-year lockdowns in the United States, which has devolved into a police state.
Soylent Green	Film	1973	2022	Adaptation of Make Room! Make Room! The world is severely overpopulated, and resources are depleting. In 2022, the population of New York City was actually around 18.8 million instead of 40 million.
Space: 1999	TV series	1975–1977	1999–2006	The Moon is knocked out of the Earth's orbit on September 13, 1999.
Space Brothers	Manga	2012	2025	JAXA has a manned moon project.
Spaceflight IC-1	Film	1965	2015	In 2015, the overpopulated civilized world is controlled by an all-powerful computerized government that is carefully choosing colonists for its newest space launch. The candidates are selected on the basis of their age, health and IQ.
Space Force	Radio series	1984–1985	2010	Sequel to Journey into Space.
Space Probe Taurus	Film	1965	2000	In 2000, humanity is investigating the feasibility of colonizing other galaxies.
"Space Seed" (from Star Trek: The Original Series)	TV series episode	1967	1992–1996, 2018	The Eugenics Wars were fought from 1992 to 1996. During this time, Khan Noonien Singh ruled a quarter of the world. Before this, interplanetary ships and suspended animation had been perfected. In 2018, advancements in sublight propulsion technology make sleeper ships obsolete. (Note: Within the Star Trek universe, a 2001 novel would portray the story as part of a secret history in which numerous real-world calamities from the period were actually parts of a single wider conflict.)
Spiral Zone	TV series	1987	2007	On June 18, 2007, a renegade military scientist, Dr. James Bent, uses a hijacked space shuttle to drop his deadly Zone Generators across half of the Earth, thus creating a region called the Spiral Zone due to its shape. Millions of people are trapped in the dark mists of the Spiral Zone and transformed into "Zoners" with lifeless yellow eyes and strange red patches on their skin.
Split Second	Film	1992	2008	Global warming causes London to be a flooded city.
Spooks: Code 9	TV series	2008	2012	There is a nuclear attack in London during the opening ceremony of the 2012 Summer Olympics.
Stand on Zanzibar	Novel	1968	2010	Predicted the decline of Detroit, electric cars, overpopulation, the European Union, in-flight entertainment, Viagra, terrorism, TiVo, reality television and a president named Obomi.
State of Emergency	Video game	2002	2023	In 2023, because of an economic collapse, the United States government is overthrown by The Corporation and a totalitarian police state is established. The video game takes place in 2035.
"Steel" (from The Twilight Zone)	TV series episode	1963	1974	This episode takes place in 1974, six years after boxing between human fighters was criminalized in 1968. The sport is dominated by robots instead.
Steel Frontier	Film	1995	2019	Post-apocalyptic neo-Western. Stars Brion James, who also starred in Blade Runner, another film set in 2019.
Stranded	Film	2001	2020	Begins as the Ares crewed spacecraft enters orbit around Mars.
Strange Adventures No. 1	Comic	1950	Late 20th century	Earth was completely covered by water during the latter part of the 20th century.
Strange Days	Film	1995	1999	Events occur near the end of the 1990s; a person's memories in their brain can be recorded on a disc called a "SQUID" that others can steal.
Street Fighter 2010	Video game	1990	2010	Aliens and bionic enhancements.
Strike Commander	Video game	1993	2011	War in the Middle East destroys most oil fields, leading to a global oil crisis and a second Great Depression. As the US begins to collapse, mercenary armies gain massive power, and begin to use high-end military craft like F-16s.
Strike Gunner S.T.G	Video game	1991	2008	Aliens invade Earth.
Summer Day's Dream	Play	1949	1975	Depicts a world in which a nuclear war has reduced the United Kingdom to a pre-industrial, pre-capitalist state and greatly reduced its population; the United States, Soviet Union and India are the world's great powers.
Super Baseball 2020	Video game	1991	2020	The sport of baseball is played entirely by robots.
The Super Dimension Fortress Macross	Anime series	1982	2009–2012	Episode 1 describes events from 1999 to 2009 when Macross first landed. Most of the story takes place starting in 2009. The final episode takes place in January 2012. A feature film, Macross: Do You Remember Love?, was made in 1984 covering the same events. An OVA epilogue subtitled Flash Back 2012 was produced in 1987 and takes place in September 2012. Was adapted into an English language version called Robotech that aired in syndication around 1985. A prequel, Macross Zero, set in 2008, was released between 2002 and 2004, but since many events in the series timeline had already occurred by that point, it could arguably be viewed as alternate history, rather than future.
Super Force	TV series	1990	2018, 2020	In 2018, the United States sent a crewed mission to Mars. Some episodes are set in 2020.
Super Glove Ball	Video game	1990	2005	Predicted motion control technology for console games.
Supreme Ruler 2020	Video game	2008	2020	The protagonist is on a quest to unify a region of fragmented states into a single government.
Supermale	Novel	1902	1920s	In the 1920s, certain men are supermales who are capable of prodigious feats of endurance and sexual athleticism. Perpetual-motion food gives cyclists the strength and stamina to keep up with the train. Love machines can make one person fall in love with another.
Superman No. 128	Comic	1959	2000	By 2000, Earth has a world government led by the President of the United Worlds, Mars has been colonized, and space travel is common. All of the planet's oceans were dissolved due to an atomic experiment.
Superman No. 300	Comic	1976	1990–2001	By 1990, the New Empire State Building has regained its status as the tallest building in the world, an impenetrable dome has been built around the White House to protect the US president, and a moonbase has been built by the United States, equipped with a destructive laser beam weapon. In that year, World War III was averted by Skyboy, who came to Earth in 1976. 3D television known as Tri-Vision was invented prior to 2001. On January 1, 2001, Boston, New York City, Philadelphia and Washington, D.C. merged to form the huge city of Metropolis.
Superman No. 400	Comic	1984	1990s	In the 1990s, World War III was averted by the efforts of Kuhan Pei-Jing.
Supervolcano	Docudrama film	2005	2020	The caldera of Yellowstone National Park undergoes a supereruption.
Surrogates	Film	2009	2017	Humans live at home and interact with the world through remotely operated androids.
Suzume	Anime	2022	2023	In September 2023, a series of earthquakes hit Japan.
SWAT 3	Video game	1999	2003–2005	World leaders gather in Los Angeles to sign a United Nations treaty abolishing nuclear weapons in 2005; meanwhile various terrorists try to disrupt the treaty signing or use it to garner attention for their causes.
Sword Art Online	Light novel	2009	2022–2026	Virtual reality technology has advanced to the point that helmets called NerveGear can directly interface with the player's brain and allow them to see the game world and control their avatars with their minds rather than through displays and controllers. The first game designed for it, a MMORPG called Sword Art Online, launches on November 6, 2022, with the developer revealing that he made everyone unable to logout, and in-game deaths or external attempts to remove the NerveGear will result in real death by means of a microwave pulse to the head.
Teenage Mutant Ninja Turtles: Turtles in Time	Video game	1991	2020	The stage "Neon Night Riders" features battles on hoverboards.
Telerop 2009 – Es ist noch was zu retten	TV series	1974	2009	As a result of environmental pollution during the 1970s and the 1980s, the natural environment has largely been destroyed in 2009. The use of pesticides killed off plants with only insects surviving, water is scarce, and smog is a permanent problem. Germany has partly turned to a steppe landscape and the share of oxygen in the air has fallen to 16%.
"Tell David..." (from Night Gallery)	TV series episode	1971	1991	In 1991, homes have one-way security windows, video telephones and technology similar to web mapping services.
"Ten In 2010"	Song	1996	2010	In 2010, the world's population is 10 billion. In reality, the world population was less than 7 billion in 2010, and it is not expected to hit 10 billion until 2058.
Ten Years	Film	2015	2020–2025	In 2020, Hong Kong government officials concoct a false flag assassination plot to justify the National Security Law.
The Terminator	Film	1984	2021	In 2021, Kyle Reese begins serving with the 132nd Special Forces Unit of the Resistance under Justin Perry against the machines.
The Terminator: Future Shock	Video game	1995	2015	Depicts Judgment Day as occurring in 1995, rather than 1997.
Terminator: Dark Fate	Film	2019	2020	The film mainly takes place in 2020 when an advanced Terminator, Rev-9, is sent back in time to kill Dani Ramos, who would become a threat to the machines in the future. The Legion's rise is averted when Rev-9 is destroyed.
Terminator 2: Judgment Day	Film	1991	1995	John Connor was conceived on May 14, 1984, meaning he was born early in 1985. The police computer lists him as ten years old. The film predicts a future AI takeover and nuclear war in 1997, with August 29 being "Judgment Day". This is averted when the Cyberdyne Systems headquarters is destroyed.
Terminator Genisys	Film	2015	2017	The first part of the film takes place in 2029, with a later part set in 2017, when the Terminator from the 1980s has aged. A new operating system, "Genisys", is released worldwide and will eventually evolve into Skynet.
Terminator: The Sarah Connor Chronicles	TV series	2008–2009	2011	A sapient artificial intelligence, John Henry, is developed.
The Tenth Planet (from Doctor Who)	TV series	1966	1986	In December 1986, Earth's former sister planet Mondas returns to the Sol System. The 1985 Doctor Who serial Attack of the Cybermen also references these events.
Terrahawks	TV series	1983	2020	An alien force has destroyed NASA's Mars base and threatens Earth.
The Texas-Israeli War: 1999	Novel	1974	1983–1999	In 1983, the nations of the world agreed to the Oslo Disarmament, resulting in nuclear stockpiles being severely reduced. In the early 1990s, the Republic of Ireland declared war on the UK, conquered Northern Ireland and expelled Protestants from that region. In August 1992, Irish commandos introduced LSD into the water supplies of much of the UK. Under the influence of the drug, the Prime Minister and Parliament ordered the use of nuclear weapons against Ireland and her allies, South Africa and China. The Commonwealth backed the UK in the emerging World War III. By the end of 1992, half of the world's population was dead; 90% had perished from plague and famine by 1994. Texas declared its independence from the United States and became the Second Republic of Texas. It went to war with Israel in 1999.
"There Will Come Soft Rains"	Short story	1950	1985 (2026 in revised version)	In 1985, computer-controlled houses cook and clean for their inhabitants. However, in that year, humanity is wiped out by a nuclear war.
"They Have Taken Over" (from NET Playhouse)	TV series episode	1970	1990	In 1990, the US government has been taken by the youth. It has decreed that the middle-aged are a drain on society's resources. At 55, people are sent to detention camps and given a maximum of ten years to live.
Things to Come	Film	1936	1940–1970	Film adaptation of The Shape of Things to Come. A global war breaks out on Christmas Day 1940. The war continues into the 1960s.
Thrice Upon a Time	Novel	1980	2009–2010	In 2009, the technology to send messages back and forth through time is invented. In 2010, the Soviet Union still exists, video telephones are commonplace, and all modern automobiles come with an automated control system allowing one to cruise hands-free on most official roads and highways.
Thunderbirds	Film	2004	2020	Loosely based on the 1960s TV series, in which a family owns a private space station.
"Time Bomb" (from Wonder Woman)	TV series episode	1978	2007	A 22nd-century time traveler refers to a nuclear apocalypse in 2007.
"The Time of the Ice Box" (from Timeslip)	TV series episode	1970	1990	In 1990, human cloning has been perfected and longevity drugs are being tested on human volunteers.
The Trial of Tony Blair	TV film	2007	2010	After his resignation as British Prime Minister in 2010, Tony Blair is put on trial for war crimes. Hillary Clinton won the 2008 US presidential election. Under the leadership of Gordon Brown, the Labour Party wins the 2010 general election. Arnold Schwarzenegger is the Secretary-General of the United Nations.
The Thirteenth Floor	Film	1999	2024	A company in 1999 creates a simulated reality of 1937, only to realise that it is in fact a simulated reality generated in 2024. The film leaves open ended whether 2024 is itself a simulation.
Threads	TV film	1984	1988–2003	In 1988, nuclear war breaks out between the United States and the Soviet Union, leading to millions of deaths all over the world and society reverting to medieval levels.
Thundarr the Barbarian	TV series	1980–1982	1994	In 1994, a runaway planet hurtles between Earth and the Moon, unleashing cosmic destruction and causing radical changes to Earth's climate and geography.
Thunderbirds	Film	2004	2010	Loosely based on the television series of the same name.
Timecop	Film	1994	2004	Time travel is used to fight crime. Voice-activated self-driving cars are in general use. The film's antagonist is a candidate in the then-future 2004 United States presidential election. It is mentioned in passing that a white supremacist party has qualified for matching funds in said election, leading to calls to end the practice.
Timecop	TV series	1997	2007	Based on the film.
Timecop 2: The Berlin Decision	Film	2003	2025	Released a year before the date in which the original Timecop is set.
The Time Machine	Film	1960	1966	George witnesses the beginning of a nuclear war on August 19, 1966.
Time Out of Joint	Novel	1959	c. 1998	Depicts a nuclear conflict between Earth and the lunar colony.
Timescape	Novel	1980	1998	In 1998, Earth is ravaged by ecological disasters such as algal blooms and diebacks on the brink of large scale extinctions. Various other events are mentioned in passing, such as student riots and an event of nuclear terrorism against New York City which took place before the events of the novel.
TimeSplitters	Video game	2000	2005 (and other eras)	Cyborgs are present in 2005; interplanetary (or interstellar) travel is invented before 2020.
Time Traveler	Video game	1991	1998 (and other past and future dates)	By 1998, the world has become a crime-ridden punk dystopia.
Time Under Fire	Film	1997	2008	A segment is set in 2008. The rest of the film is set in the 1990s and 2077.
Titan by John Varley	Novel	1979	2025	Features a scientific expedition to Saturn.
Titan by Stephen Baxter	Novel	1997	Early 21st century	Features a crewed mission to Titan during a predicted intellectual Dark Age.
Tom Clancy's EndWar	Video game	2008	2016–2020	Predicted the rise of a unified European superstate called the "European Federation". Also predicted that a militarization of space would reach its peak in 2020.
Tom Clancy's Ghost Recon	Video game	2001	2008	Predicts a war between Russia and NATO in 2008 after a coup d'état in Moscow by ultra-nationalists. Correctly predicted a Russian invasion of Georgia in 2008.
Tom Clancy's Ghost Recon: Advanced Warfighter	Video game	2006	2013	A civil war in Mexico erupts, orchestrated by Mexicans opposed to the pending ratification of a military alliance by Mexico with Canada and the United States.
Tom Clancy's Ghost Recon: Advanced Warfighter 2	Video game	2007	2013	A civil war in Mexico erupts, orchestrated by Mexicans opposed to the pending ratification of a military alliance by Mexico with Canada and the United States.
Tom Clancy's Ghost Recon Breakpoint	Video game	2019	2025	Takes place one year after Future Soldier.
Tom Clancy's Ghost Recon: Desert Siege	Video game	2002	2009	Predicts a war between Ethiopia and Eritrea in 2009 following a revanchist coup d'état in the former. To protect shipping lanes in the Red Sea, the US militarily intervenes on Eritrea's side and ejects the invading Ethiopians from the country.
Tom Clancy's Ghost Recon: Future Soldier	Video game	2012	2024	A paramilitary group seizes control of Russia and launches a nuclear missile at London.
Tom Clancy's Ghost Recon: Island Thunder	Video game	2002	2010	Fidel Castro dies in 2006; this is followed by years of violent instability in Cuba. By 2010, Cuba prepares to host its first free and fair elections in decades, but various terrorist groups still pose a threat to the democratization process. The US dispatches special forces to Cuba to safeguard the transition to democracy, and despite efforts by terrorists and even the Colombian FARC to stop it, the transition happens successfully.
Tom Clancy's Ghost Recon: Jungle Storm	Video game	2004	2010	The United States dispatches special forces to Colombia in 2010 to battle leftist terrorists after the latter attacks United Nations personnel in the country.
Tom Clancy's Ghost Recon 2	Video game	2004	2007–2011	GameCube and PlayStation 2 versions of the game depict a war between North Korea and South Korea in 2007, with the Xbox version of the game depicting US special forces operating in North Korea 4 years later during a quasi-civil war there to stop a rogue North Korean general from launching nuclear missiles.
Tom Clancy's Ghost Recon 2: Summit Strike	Video game	2005	2012	A civil war occurs in Kazakhstan; the US deploys special operations forces there to help put a stop to it.
Tom Clancy's Ghost Recon: Wildlands	Video game	2017	2019	Depicts rural Bolivia as having been taken over by a Mexican drug cartel called Santa Blanca. It also shows optical camouflage as being a prototype.
Tom Clancy's Rainbow Six	Video game	1998	1999–2000	Depicts an attempted terrorist attack on the 2000 Summer Olympics in Australia that is foiled by special operations forces.
Tom Clancy's Rainbow Six: Rogue Spear: Black Thorn	Video game	2001	2004	Terrorists attempt to attack the 2004 Summer Olympics in Athens, Greece, but are foiled by special operations forces.
Tom Clancy's Rainbow Six: Lockdown	Video game	2005	2009	The South African president is kidnapped by terrorists and there is a terrorist attack on the Scottish Parliament in the United Kingdom.
Tom Clancy's Rainbow Six 3: Raven Shield	Video game	2003	2005–2007	A former Croatian Ustase member launches a series of terrorist attacks across the world to exact revenge on the former Allies for defeating the Axis in World War II and in the hopes that said attacks will revitalize the neo-fascist movement.
Tom Clancy's Rainbow Six: Take-Down – Missions in Korea	Video game	2001	2003	The Japanese yakuza battle special operations forces in South Korea in a gang war.
Tom Clancy's Splinter Cell	Video game	2002	2004–2005	A nationalistic strongman takes over Georgia in a coup d'état and surreptitiously invades Azerbaijan using special forces; the Georgians then conduct a secretive genocide against Azerbaijanis. Upon learning of this through the National Security Agency, NATO and the United States intervene militarily to depose the Georgian leader and eject the Georgian military from Azerbaijan.
Tom Clancy's Splinter Cell: Chaos Theory	Video game	2005	2007	North Korea invades South Korea and an attempted coup d'état in Japan by Japanese ultra-nationalists is foiled by the United States through the National Security Agency. Correctly predicted North Korea becoming a nuclear weapons state by 2007.
Tom Clancy's Splinter Cell: Conviction	Video game	2010	2011	Terrorists attack Washington, D.C. using an electromagnetic pulse device and then proceed to take over the White House and hold the US president hostage; predicted a female US president holding office in 2011.
Tom Clancy's Splinter Cell: Double Agent	Video game	2006	2007–2008	Depicts a civil war in the Democratic Republic of the Congo.
Tom Clancy's Splinter Cell: Pandora Tomorrow	Video game	2004	2006	An Indonesian terrorist, angered by the independence of former Indonesian colony East Timor and US support for it, launches a terroristic war against East Timor and the United States, the latter over its support for East Timorese independence and sovereignty.
The Transformers: The Movie	Film	1986	2005	By 2005, the presence of the Autobots on Earth has elevated human technology to highly advanced levels.
Trauma Center: Under the Knife and Trauma Center: Second Opinion	Video game	2005	2018	By 2018, AIDS and cancer have cures. Trauma Center: Under the Knife 2, released in 2008, takes place in 2021.
"Trends"	Short story	1939	1973–1978, 2008	After a failed attempt in 1973, the first free-return trajectory is made around the Moon in 1978.
The True Meaning of Smekday	Children's book	2007	2013	Aliens colonise Earth and force the human race to relocate to Florida. Later adapted into the 2015 DreamWorks animated film Home.
The Tunnel	Film	1935	After 1940	The film concerns the building of a transatlantic tunnel. The Channel Tunnel was noted to have been built in 1940.
The Tunnel Thru the Air; Or, Looking Back from 1940	Novel	1927	1930–1932	From 1930 to 1932, the United States fights a major war against Japan. The war began when Japan attacked the East Coast in April 1930. Many American cities were attacked and destroyed but the US emerged victorious on July 4, 1932.
Tunnel Vision	Film	1976	1985	In 1985, a new television network called TunnelVision is entirely free of censorship (aided by a new Bill of Rights, written in 1983). George Wallace won the 1976 presidential election and served one term.
The Turner Diaries	Novel	1978	1983	1991 in later editions. Depicts the violent overthrow of the US government by racist terrorists and a subsequent global race war.
"The Truth" (from The X-Files)	TV series episode	2002	2012	The final date set for alien colonisation. See also: 2012 phenomenon.
Twilight's Last Gleaming	Novel	2014	2025	The United States invades Tanzania to seize their oil reserves. William has become King of the United Kingdom. The US previously participated in wars in Ukraine and Venezuela.
Twisted Metal 3	Video game	1998	2008	The game predicted that Hollywood would be leveled by a great earthquake in 2007.
Ubik	Novel	1969	1992	The Moon has been colonised, psychic powers are common and cryonic suspension has been perfected.
Undersea Super Train: Marine Express	Anime film	1979	2002	An undersea train connects North America with Japan.
UFO	TV series	1970	1980	Depicts a covert alien invasion of Earth.
UFO: Enemy Unknown	Video game	1994	1999	Sixteen of the world's most powerful countries jointly fund a defence and research organisation to tackle the rising threat of alien invasions. The final mission features a raid on the aliens' base on Mars.
UFO: Extraterrestrials	Video game	2007	2023–2025	Depicts the colonization of the planet and a subsequent alien invasion.
The Ultimate Warrior	Film	1975	2012	In 2012, a virus holocaust has devastated the planet.
Under the Dog	OVA	2016	2025	Set in Neo Tokyo five years after a terrorist attack at the 2020 Tokyo Olympics.
"The Unparalleled Invasion"	Short story	1910	1922–1987	On May 1, 1976, the United States and other Western powers launch a biological warfare campaign against China, resulting in the destruction of the Chinese population. China is later colonized by the Western Powers.
Until the End of the World	Film	1991	1999	An Indian nuclear satellite loses control and heads towards Earth, causing mass chaos. A means of recording dreams is invented.
Uplink	Video game	2001	2010	Correctly predicted that computers would have up to 8 CPUs by 2010, though it overestimated processor speed at 200 GHz.
Urban Strike	Video game	1994	2001	Predicts a terrorist attack on the World Trade Center Towers in 2001.
U.S. Navy Fighters	Video game	1994	1997	Predicts a Russo-Ukrainian War occurring in 1997 after ultranationalists overthrow the Russian government of Boris Yeltsin and subsequently invade Ukraine; in response the US dispatches the USS Dwight Eisenhower carrier strike group into the Black Sea in order to defend Ukraine (which the US has signed a defense treaty with).
Vendetta dal futuro	Film	1986	1997	In a dystopian United States, an industrialist builds a cyborg and gives him a mission to kill the leader of an ecological faction. However, he fails and takes asylum in Arizona, where he must choose between his human and robotic natures.
Venus Wars	Manga, Anime	1986 (manga), 1989 (anime)	2003–2089	In 2003, a large comet strikes Venus, dispersing its atmosphere, speeding its rotation and providing it with acidic oceans. Colonization begins in 2012. By 2089 the two native populations (on Ishtar and Aphrodite Terra) are at war.
A Very British Coup	TV miniseries	1988	1991–1992	Harry Perkins, an unassuming, working class, very left-wing Leader of the Labour Party and Member of Parliament for Sheffield Central, becomes Prime Minister in March 1991. The priorities of the Perkins Government include dissolving all newspaper monopolies, withdrawal from NATO, removing all US military bases on UK soil, unilateral nuclear disarmament and true open government. The royal cypher on one of the Prime Minister's red boxes is shown as "C III R", suggesting that the monarch is Charles III, the now-current monarch of the United Kingdom.
V for Vendetta	Comic	1982–1985	1997–1998	The storyline of the comic takes place from November 5, 1997, to November 5, 1998. The 2005 film adaptation is set between these dates in 2025 and 2026 with references to 2014 and 2015.
"Vincent Deem 1997" (from Exploring Tomorrow)	Radio drama	1958	1977–1997	Time travel was discovered in 1977. After the War of 1980, which destroyed all plant life, guns were outlawed all over Earth. In 1997, the credit is the American unit of currency. By this time, health rays, video phones and moving sidewalks are commonplace and supermarkets are equipped with robot cashiers.
Virtual Light	Novel	1993	2006	Simulated reality via direct stimulation of the brain's visual cortex has recently been invented. The San Francisco-Oakland Bay Bridge is now a shanty town.
Vortex	Novel	1991	1993–1994	Depicts a civil war in South Africa after a soft coup d'état by reactionaries attempts to forestall anti-apartheid legislative reforms; correctly predicted the end of South African apartheid and South Africa transitioning to majority rule in 1994.
Voyage to the Prehistoric Planet	Film	1965	2020	In that film, the moon is colonized. A group of men land on Venus, where they find a prehistoric world consisted of plants, various monsters, and so on.
The War Game	Film	1965	1966	A pseudo-documentary about the effects of a nuclear attack in Kent. The nuclear war was caused as a result of the Vietnam War escalating.
The War in Space	Film	1977	1988	Space combat is routine and a "United Nations Space Force" is established.
The War in the Air	Novel	1907	Late 1910s	Depicts a world war, initiated by Germany against the United States, who later ally with a combined China/Japan empire and the British Empire, respectively, fought using fixed-wing heavier-than-air craft. Predicted the use of military aircraft, a world war before 1920, an attack by Japan against the United States, the denial of rights to US citizens of Japanese descent, and a global financial collapse.
The War of the Worlds	Novel	1898	Early in the 20th century	Depicts an invasion of the Earth by Martians. Predicted laser weaponry and chemical weapons.
Warday	Novel	1983	1988–1993	A nuclear attack on New York City in October 1988 resulted in a nuclear war in which the United States and the Soviet Union were both devastated. In the vacuum left by the devastation of the US and the Soviets, the United Kingdom and Japan became superpowers.
Way...Way Out	Film	1966	1989	Sex comedy set on competing US and Soviet moon bases.
Weapons of Choice	Novel	2004	2021	On January 15, 2021, a fleet under the command of Admiral Phillip Kolhammer is sent back in time to June 2, 1942. Hillary Clinton was a wartime President.
Weathering with You	Anime	2019	2021–2024	In June 2021, a continuous rain begins over Tokyo, and by April 2024, the vast majority of Tokyo is under water.
We Can Build You	Novel	1972	1982	By 1982, electronic organs and androids are mass-produced.
"We Right Here"	Song	2001	2003	DMX states the song will still "knock" in 2003.
Westworld	Film	1973	1983	Set mainly in a theme park filled with androids.
When Smuts Goes	Novel	1947	1952	In 1952, the National Party comes to power in South Africa and institutes a fascist dictatorship. Correctly predicted the rise of apartheid in South Africa and its subsequent end.
The White Plague	Novel	1982	1996	The family of the protagonist, John Roe O'Neill, are killed by an IRA bomb on May 20, 1996, resulting in his descent into insanity. He plans a gendercidal revenge and creates a plague that kills only women, but for which men are the carriers. O'Neill then releases it in Ireland (for supporting the terrorists), England (for oppressing the Irish and giving them a cause) and Libya (for training said terrorists).
Wicked City	OVA	1987	End of the 20th century	At the dawn of the new millennium, the human world secretly coexists with the demonic "Black World" – an alternate dimension populated by supernatural demons with a secret human police force known as the Black Guard protecting the boundary. For centuries, a peace treaty between the Black World and the world of humans has been maintained to ensure relative harmony. When a group of radicalized members of the Black World conspire to sabotage the renegotiation of the treaty, the Black Guard must stop them.
"The Wilderness"	Short story	1952	2003	In 2003, commercial travel to Mars is common.
Wild Palms	TV miniseries	1993	2007	America is ruled by a right-wing group called the Fathers, opposed by the libertarian movement, the Friends. Television programs are presented as virtual reality. Technology allows humans to become living holograms, a form of immortality.
A Wind Named Amnesia	Novel	1983	1999	In 1999, the world has been reduced to an apocalyptic wasteland due to an inexplicable gust of wind that wiped even the most basic memories, such as speech and civility, from the minds of the world's populace.
"The Winnowing"	Short story	1976	2005	In 2005, Earth is experiencing acute famine due to its population of six billion.
WinSPMBT	Video game	2005	2005–2020	Part of the Steel Panthers video games, simulates various "historical" battles from 1946 to 2025.
"With Folded Hands" (from Dimension X)	Radio drama	1950	2006	An adaptation of the 1947 short story by Jack Williamson. In 2006, household robots called "Mechanicals" are commonplace.
With the Night Mail	Novella	1905	2000	Describes the Aerial Board of Control, a supranational organization dedicated to the control and aid of airship traffic across the whole world.
Witness to the Execution	TV film	1994	1999	In 1999, US morality has fallen to such lows that the execution of an (innocent) person is treated as if it were the Super Bowl or a similar sports tournament. A fictional television network desires to broadcast the execution as a pay-per-view event.
The Wizard of Mars	Film	1965	1975	The first crewed probe to orbit Mars arrives at its destination on January 1, 1975.
The World a Department Store	Novel	1900	1925	By 1925, the socialist Coöperative Association of America has eliminated poverty, tenements, slums, litter and other aspects of the old style American economy. Photo IDs are used. Both men and women pursue physical fitness, and work out in gymnasiums. The public school system monitors the schoolchildren's nutritional needs.
The World Jones Made	Novel	1956	2002	Post-nuclear world in which evangelism of any ideology whatsoever is outlawed, but a messianic named Jones becomes head of a xenophobic movement.
The World Next Door	Novel	1990	1997	Published one year before Mikhail Gorbachev resigned, it depicts a 1997 in which the failure of his reforms leads to a nuclear war between the US and the USSR.
World War III	TV miniseries	1982	1987	World War III breaks out in 1987.
Wurm: Journey to the Center of the Earth	Video game	1991	1999	A massive earthquake forces everyone to look underground.
X a.k.a. X/1999	Manga	1992	1999	The Battle of Armageddon is preparing to take place in Tokyo.
X: Beyond the Frontier	Video game	1999	2022	While the game takes place in 2912, the setting's events are ultimately kicked off by a student of the University of Tokyo accidentally discovering how to create wormholes in 2022. By then, according to supplementary material, a simplified version of Japanese had replaced English as the primary language of science following Japan experiencing an economic boom and becoming the center of research. It also predicted that the International Space Station was going to be completed in 2007, and that by 2011 quantum computers would "dominate the market" and nanotechnology would be about to become practical.
"The Year of the Burn Up" (from Timeslip)	TV series episode	1970–1971	1990	In 1990, Earth is ruled by a technocracy and England is covered by tropical rainforests.
The Year of the Quiet Sun	Novel	1970	1978–2000	In the summer of 1978, a time travel experiment is conducted by the United States military. In 1980, there are ongoing race riots in Chicago. President Meeks' successful handling of the riots results in him winning that year's presidential election in a landslide. In 1999, Chicago is in the midst of a racial civil war. The city had recently been attacked with a nuclear bomb launched from China on behalf of black guerrillas.
Years and Years	TV series	2019	2019–2034	A British family witnesses life unfold over a 25-year period, including economic upheaval, populism, pandemics, species extinctions and new technologies.
Year Zero	Album	2007	2008–2022	Album by Nine Inch Nails which predicts several future events, such as a bioterrorist attack and a nuclear war between the US and Iran, ending in 2022 when America is "born again".
Yesterday	Film	2002	2020	Korean reunification is a reality.
Your Safety First	Short film	1956	2000	In 2000, cars are self-driving, commercial travel to the Moon is common, television is 3D and interactive and life expectancy has increased significantly.
Zak McKracken and the Alien Mindbenders	Video game	1988	1997	Aliens controlling "The Phone Company" lower the world's intelligence with a low-frequency hum.
Zebraman	Film	2004	2010	An alien invasion launches under a Japanese high school.
Zombie Nation	Video game	1990	1999	In 1999, zombies have taken over the entirety of the United States.
Zombie Strippers	Film	2008	2016	The film takes place in the fourth Presidential term of George W. Bush. The film was released in February 2008, before Bush left office.

== See also ==
- Future history
- Near future in fiction
- Retrofuturism
- List of films set in the future by date of setting
- List of time travel works of fiction
- List of dates predicted for apocalyptic events
