= Nikopol =

Nikopol (derived from Greek Nicopolis (Νικόπολις), "City of Victory") may refer to:

== Places and regions ==
- Nikopol, Ukraine
  - Nikopol Raion, Ukraine
  - FC Elektrometalurh-NZF Nikopol, a Ukrainian football club
  - FC Nikopol, a Ukrainian football club
  - Nikopol Ferroalloy Plant
- Nikopol, Bulgaria
  - Nikopol municipality, Bulgaria
  - Battle of Nikopol
  - Roman Catholic Diocese of Nicopoli
  - Nikopol Point, a coastal feature in the South Shetland Islands in the Antarctic, named after Nikopol, Bulgaria

== Entertainment and fiction ==
- The Nikopol Trilogy, a series of graphic novels by Enki Bilal
  - Nikopol, the main character in the 2004 film Immortal, based on the books
  - Nikopol: Secrets of the Immortals, a White Birds Productions video game based on the books

== See also ==
- Nicopolis (disambiguation)
