= Nicopolis (disambiguation) =

Nicopolis was an ancient city and archbishopric in Epirus, now in continental Greece.

Nicopolis or Nikopolis (Greek: "city of victory") may also refer to:

== In Europe ==
- Nicopolis (theme), a Byzantine theme (military province) encompassing western Greece
- Nicopolis ad Istrum, a city in Moesia, also known as Nicopolis ad Iaternum, now Stari-Nicup in northern Bulgaria
- Nicopolis ad Nestum, city in Thrace, ruins at modern Garmen in southern Bulgaria
- Nikopol, Bulgaria

== In Africa ==
- Nicopolis, a city on Egypt's Mediterranean coast, about five miles east of Alexandria

== In Asia ==
Anatolia (Turkey)

- Nicopolis (Armenia), an ancient Roman colony, now Koyulhisar in Turkey
- Nicopolis (Bithynia), an ancient town of Bithynia in northwestern Anatolia
- Nicopolis (Cilicia), an ancient town of Cilicia in southeastern Anatolia
- Nicopolis, a city in Asia Minor, now Afyonkarahisar
- Nikopolis, the old name for Şebinkarahisar

Holy Land

- Emmaus Nicopolis, a Roman name for the city of Emmaus as refounded in 221 AD (in present-day Israel), Arabic ‘Amwās

== See also ==
- Battle of Nicopolis
- Nikopoli, Thessaloniki
- Nikopol (disambiguation)
- Nikopsis
