= Woman Trap =

Woman Trap may refer to:

- Woman Trap (1929 film), directed by William A. Wellman
- Woman Trap (1936 film), directed by Harold Young
- La Femme Piège or The Woman Trap, a 1986 science fiction graphic novel
