= La Foire aux immortels =

1980 Graphic novel by Enki Bilal

The Carnival of Immortals (La Foire aux Immortels)
- Cover of the French edition
- Series: The Nikopol Trilogy
- Publisher: Les Humanoïdes Associés

Creative team
- Writers: Enki Bilal
- Artists: Enki Bilal

Original publication
- Date of publication: 1980
- ISBN: 978-2205016901

Translation
- Publisher: Humanoids Publishing

The Carnival of Immortals (French: La Foire aux immortels; also published in English as Gods in Chaos and A Bedlam of Immortals) is a 1980 science fiction graphic novel written and illustrated by the Yugoslavian-born French cartoonist and storyteller Enki Bilal. It is the first part of the Nikopol Trilogy, followed up by La Femme piège (The Woman Trap) in 1986 and ending with Froid Équateur (Equator Cold) in 1992. In 2004, Bilal directed the film adaptation Immortel (Ad Vitam), although many plot elements were changed from the comic book.

La Foire aux immortels is regarded as one of the most original science fiction comics which have revolutionised the conventions of comic art.

== Plot ==
Set in the year 2023, the book follows Alcide Nikopol's return to Paris after spending 30 years frozen in space as a punishment for dodging the draft. The Paris he once knew is now ruled by fascist dictator J. F. Choublanc, the city is swarming with aliens, decaying and succumbing to chaos. At the same time, a flying pyramid-shaped space craft is hovering over Paris. It is inhabited by Egyptian gods who ask for fuel from the local authorities, as their pyramid vessel has run out of gas. In return for this service, Choublanc wants immortality from the gods. One renegade god, Horus, meets up with the disillusioned Nikopol in the Metro, and Nikopol agrees to allow Horus control of his body. Together they go on a journey to oppose the corrupt and megalomaniacal powers of the 21st century.
