= Nicopolis (Bithynia) =

Nicopolis or Nikopolis (Ancient Greek: Νικόπολις, "city of victory") was a town of ancient Bithynia, on the Bosphorus. Pliny the Elder notes that it stood upon a Gulf which in his time still bore the name, north from Chrysopolis.

Its precise site is unlocated.
