= The Nikopol Trilogy =

Series of graphic novels by Enki Bilal

The Nikopol Trilogy (La trilogie Nikopol)
- Cover of the English edition of The Nikopol Trilogy
- Publisher: Les Humanoïdes Associés

Creative team
- Writers: Enki Bilal
- Artists: Enki Bilal

Translation
- Publisher: Humanoids Publishing
- Date: 1999 (English edition of the full trilogy)
- ISBN: 978-0967240121

The Nikopol Trilogy is a series of three science fiction graphic novels written in French by Yugoslavian-born Enki Bilal, published between 1980 and 1992. The original French titles of the series are La Foire aux immortels (1980), La Femme piège (1986), and Froid Équateur (1992), which in 1995 were collected together in a single volume entitled La Trilogie Nikopol. The individual stories were translated into English and published by Humanoids Publishing under the titles Gods in Chaos, The Woman Trap, and Cold Equator. In 1999, the trilogy was also published in English as a single volume, The Nikopol Trilogy. The series is regarded as one of the most original science fiction comics which have revolutionised the conventions of comic art.

The central plot of the trilogy, set in 2023 Paris, follows Alcide Nikopol who returns from a 30-year sentence spent orbiting the Earth under cryopreservation to find France under fascist rule following two nuclear wars.

The books have been adapted into the video game Nikopol: Secrets of the Immortals, published by White Birds Productions, and a movie, entitled Immortal.

== Legacy ==
The track Nikopol by Portuguese electronic band Sensible Soccers on their 2014 album "8" was inspired by the trilogy.
