= Froid Équateur =

1992 graphic novel by Enki Bilal

Equator Cold (Froid Équateur)
- Series: The Nikopol Trilogy
- Publisher: Les Humanoïdes Associés

Creative team
- Writers: Enki Bilal
- Artists: Enki Bilal

Original publication
- Date of publication: 1992
- ISBN: 978-2731609837

Translation
- Publisher: Humanoids Publishing

Froid Équateur (published in English as Equator Cold and Cold Equator) is a science fiction graphic novel published in 1992, written and illustrated by Yugoslavian-French cartoonist and storyteller Enki Bilal. It is the third and final part of the Nikopol Trilogy, started by La Foire aux immortels (The Carnival of Immortals) from 1980 and continuing with La Femme piège (The Woman Trap) in 1986. The books were awarded with the Book of the Year Award by the magazine Lire. Froid Équateur had an initial print run of more than 150,000 copies.

== Chess boxing ==
The book extensively features chess boxing, a hybrid sport mixing chess and boxing. In 2003, chess boxing became a real sport, directly inspired by how it appeared in Froid Équateur.
