= Nikopol: Secrets of the Immortals =

2008 video game

- Developer: White Birds Productions
- Publisher: Got Game Entertainment
- Platforms: Cloud (OnLive); Microsoft Windows
- Release: NA: September 20, 2008; EU: November 14, 2008
- Genre: Adventure
- Mode: Single-player

Nikopol: Secrets of the Immortals (French: Nikopol: La Foire aux immortels) is a point-and-click adventure game developed by White Birds Productions and based on the graphic novels of Enki Bilal's The Nikopol Trilogy.

== Plot ==
The year is 2023, and a power-hungry dictator governs Paris. Alcide Nikopol must try to find a way to join the underground rebellion and help stop the dictator's iron fist rule. The history turns towards the weird, as Nikopol finds out that his father, an astronaut sent into orbital exile in cryopreservation, may be alive and well in the city. At the same time, a strange pyramid hovers over Paris, and a rumour of Egyptian gods residing in it spreads like wildfire.

== Reception ==
Reception

Aggregate score
Aggregator	Score
Metacritic	68/100

Review scores
Publication	Score
4Players	62%
Adventure Gamers	2/5
Gamekult	6/10
GameSpot	5.5/10
GameStar	60%
Gamezebo	50/100
GameZone	8/10
IGN	8.2/10
Jeuxvideo.com	13/20
PC Format	42%

According to the review aggregation website Metacritic, the game received "average" reviews.
