= La Femme Piège =

1986 Graphic novel by Enki Bilal

La Femme piège
- Cover of the French edition
- Date: 1986
- Series: La trilogie Nikopol
- Publisher: Dargaud

Creative team
- Writers: Enki Bilal
- Artists: Enki Bilal
- Colorists: Enki Bilal

Original publication
- Language: French
- ISBN: 2-205-03054-X

Chronology
- Preceded by: La Foire aux immortels
- Followed by: Froid Équateur

La Femme piège (published in English as The Woman Trap), is a science fiction graphic novel from 1986 written and illustrated by the Yugoslavian born cartoonist and storyteller Enki Bilal. It is the second part of the Nikopol Trilogy, started by La Foire aux immortels (The Carnival of Immortals) from 1980 and ending with Froid Équateur (Equator Cold) in 1992.

== Plot ==
Two years have passed since the fall of the fascist regime and the departure of the gods. Alcide Nicopole slowly regains his senses and increasingly senses Horus' return to Earth.

In London, Jill Bioskop, a young journalist, witnesses the assassination of John, her extra-terrestrial lover, on the telephone. She decides to use John's medication to literally forget her pain and her relationship with him. Jeff, a friend of the latter, finds her in a coma from which she emerges after two days. He offers to cover in Berlin the return of a space mission that left decades earlier. In the evening, Jill kills Jeff after he tries to sleep with her.

In Paris, Alcide junior is informed that his father has finally recovered his sanity. Jill goes to Berlin while, in space, the gods realize that the stone where Horus was locked was torn away by a collision with an asteroid. Jill kills her driver after he tries to rape her the night after her arrival and continues to take her former lover's drugs to forget her new crime. She witnesses one of the many absurd martial contests that bloody the city and transcribes everything on a device which sends her article 25 years earlier on a fax from a French newspaper (of which the album offers a facsimile).

In Berlin, scientists discover that everyone on the space mission is dead, except for one young woman. Horus, who had hidden inside her, kills the scientists before setting out to find Alcide. Alcide admits to having regained his senses and announces his departure to his son, not being able to adapt to the new society that has been established in his absence and knowing very well that now that Horus is back he, John, will never be able to escape Horus. Horus uses the body of Ivan, a colleague of Jill's, to approach her, feeling that the young woman has an important role to play through her relationship with Alcide. Ivan succumbs to Jill's charms, who kills him in self-defense.

Arriving in Berlin, Alcide meets Horus and offers him a deal. Knowing that god and man are losing their way alone, he offers to join forces, offering him shelter away from Anubis' research in exchange for an intense and surprising life. He also asks her to introduce him to Jill, with whom he fell in love through his nightmares. Horus accepts the deal. They find Jill in the company of John, who had survived the attack. John corrects the dosage errors that Jill made in order to restore his chemical balance, keeping the last tablets for himself and considers his relationship with the young woman to be over.

A few weeks later, recovered, Jill realizes that she has never killed anyone except in her hallucinations and begins a relationship with Alcide.

== Publication history ==
La Femme piège was initially published by Dargaud in 1986, later reissued by Les Humanoïdes Associés in 1990. An English translation was first published by the now defunct publishing house Catalan Communications in 1988. he most recent translation published by Humanoids Publishing in 1999 contains all three volumes of the Nikopol Trilogy.

Certain special edition issues of the album also contained 4 newspaper pages written by Jill Bioskop, reporting from the future, for newspapers Libération and De Morgen in the French and Belgian editions respectively. The contents were extra background information about certain aspects which are kept obscured in the graphic novel.

== Sources ==
- Nikopol publications Bedetheque (in French)
