= Immortal (2004 film) =

2004 French film by Enki Bilal

- Theatrical release poster
- Directed by: Enki Bilal
- Written by: Enki Bilal (scenario, adaptation and dialogue); Serge Lehman (script)
- Based on: Comic book La Foire aux immortels by Enki Bilal
- Produced by: Charles Gassot
- Starring: Linda Hardy; Thomas Kretschmann; Charlotte Rampling; Frédéric Pierrot; Jean-Louis Trintignant
- Cinematography: Pascal Gennesseaux
- Edited by: Véronique Parnet
- Music by: Goran Vejvoda
- Production companies: Duran Entertainment; Quantic Dream
- Distributed by: UGC Fox Distribution
- Release date: 24 March 2004 (France)
- Running time: 102 minutes
- Country: France
- Languages: French; English
- Budget: €22.5 million
- Box office: $7.2 million

Immortal (French: Immortel, ad vitam) is a 2004 English language French live-action and animated science fiction film co-written and directed by Enki Bilal and starring Linda Hardy, Thomas Kretschmann, and Charlotte Rampling. It is loosely based upon Bilal's comic book La Foire aux immortels (The Carnival of Immortals). Immortal was one of the first major films (along with Casshern and Sky Captain and the World of Tomorrow) to be shot entirely on a "digital backlot", blending live actors with computer generated surroundings. The French video game studio Quantic Dream helped produce much of the cinematics.

== Plot ==
In New York City, during the late 21st century, genetically altered humans live side by side with aliens and other beings, with the former lording over the latter and treating them as second class citizens. These beings have come to Earth as refugees via the "inclusion zone", a mysterious vortex which appeared one day, encompassing Central Park and sealing it off. The forcefield allows the refugees to exit, but anyone who tries to enter is instantly killed.

A strange pyramid appears hovering over the city. Within, the gods of ancient Egypt discuss their fellow god Horus and conclude that his rebellious antics are unacceptable and must be punished, sentencing him to lose his immortality and summarily be executed. They grant Horus seven days to "look upon his creation", and inform him that the only way to save himself is to reincarnate in a new body. However, the only way to do this is to find and mate with a compatible woman capable of carrying a god's child, a trait which is extremely rare.

In the city below, Jill, a young woman with blue hair and a fey countenance, is captured by agents of the all-powerful corrupt eugenics company that controls much of the government and private sector, who kidnap the alien refugees to experiment on them. She is humanoid in appearance, but not quite human; her tears are blue and stain her pure white skin, and upon being examined by the company's scientists, it is discovered that her body's cells are no more than three months old despite looking and acting like a fully grown adult. Unbeknownst to the scientists, Jill is a bioengineered being, explaining her human-like appearance and unusual paranormal abilities. One of these abilities is the aforementioned capacity to procreate with gods, but she is unaware of this, nor is she aware that she was created explicitly for this purpose. Her genome is rapidly adapting and changing into that of a regular human, with the tradeoff being that she will lose all memories of her former self once the transformation is complete. One of the scientists, Dr. Elma Turner, is fascinated by Jill's unique physiology and becomes enamored with her, subsequently helping facilitate her escape.

Elsewhere, Horus begins his search for a mate, but time is short as not only is his execution looming, but Jill herself will lose her unique ability to bear his child once she becomes fully human. He must inhabit a mortal body to perform this task, but quickly finds that anyone he tries to possess self destructs in a gruesome manner. He deduces that humankind has become incompatible due to their genetic modification, and are thus incapable of handling his godly presence within them. Desperate to find a suitable host body, Horus eventually encounters Nikopol, a political rebel condemned to thirty years of hibernation who, due to a mechanical accident, escapes his imprisonment one year early when the wall of the cryo-prison crumbles. Nikopol, having been in cryostasis for several decades, has remained unmodified, and thus is able to be a host body for Horus to inhabit, much to Nikopol's chagrin. Horus possesses Nikopol's body but fails to take full control of him, causing the two to frequently clash with one another. Nikopol, having lost his leg as a result of the prison toppling, is given a replacement by Horus which he fashioned out of some steel railway track, with the comical side effect that it is too heavy for Nikopol to move on his own when he is in control of his body. Together, the two set out to fulfill Horus's quest.

Nikopol and Horus eventually find Jill, and Horus begins to put his plan in motion by seducing her as Nikopol. Nikopol takes umbrage with this, decrying Horus's actions as sexual assault, which Horus thinks is merely a necessity and not wrong, as he is a god and therefore anything he does is, by definition, morally just. Nikopol begins to fall in love with Jill, further complicating matters.

Meanwhile, a police inspector is investigating a series of serial killings in which the bodies of seemingly random individuals appear to have been torn apart from the inside out. The victims are the remains of the previous hosts Horus tried to inhabit, and Nikopol as well as Jill become suspects. Nikopol/Horus must woo Jill while simultaneously trying to keep her safe from the eugenics corporation, as well as staying one step ahead of the police. Eventually, Horus is successful and impregnates her in the nick of time, giving Nikopol's body back and leaving a parting gift by granting him the ability to move his heavy metal leg on his own. A year later, Nikopol bumps into a now fully human Jill in Paris with her new baby, a blue falcon who Jill describes as "cheeky". She does not remember him, but the two strike up a conversation, hinting that they may one day rekindle their romance. As the film ends, the camera pans up to the pyramid ship where Horus is entombed in a sarcophagus, a glimmer of light flashing in his eyes.

== Cast ==
- Linda Hardy as Jill Bioskop (voiced by Barbara Scaff)
- Thomas Kretschmann as Alcide Nikopol
- Charlotte Rampling as Elma Turner
- Frédéric Pierrot as John (voiced by Dominic Gould)
- Thomas M. Pollard as Horus
- Yann Collette as Froebe (voiced by Geoffrey Carey)
- Joe Sheridan as Senator Allgood
- Corinne Jaber as Lily Liang
- Olivier Achard as Checker (voiced by Geoffrey Carey)
- Derrick Brenner as Jonas
- Jerry Di Giacomo as Jack

== Production ==
In the film, Linda Hardy is dubbed by an English-speaking actress (Barbara Weber-Scaff), except for one piece of dialogue delivered in her native French.
