= Syberia II =

2004 video game

- Developer: Microïds Canada
- Publishers: NA: XS Games (PC, Xbox); EU: MC2-Microïds
- Director: Benoît Sokal
- Designer: Stéphane Blais
- Programmer: Rémi Veilleux
- Artists: Benoît Sokal; Nicolas Cantin
- Writer: Benoît Sokal
- Composer: Inon Zur
- Series: Syberia
- Engine: Virtools Engine 3.0
- Platforms: Microsoft Windows, OS X, PlayStation 2, Xbox, Xbox 360, PlayStation 3, Nintendo Switch, iOS, Android, Windows Mobile
- Release: 30 March 2004: Microsoft Windows; NA: 30 March 2004; EU: 28 May 2004 Xbox; NA: 12 October 2004; EU: 26 November 2004 PlayStation 2; EU: 26 November 2004 Windows Mobile; NA: 20 April 2007 Android; WW: 26 March 2015 PlayStation 3; PAL: 1 April 2015; NA: 5 May 2015 Xbox 360; WW: 13 May 2015 OS X; WW: 17 August 2015 iOS; WW: 15 October 2015 Nintendo Switch; WW: 30 November 2017
- Genre: Graphic adventure
- Mode: Single-player

Syberia II is a 2004 graphic adventure game developed and published by MC2-Microïds. As the direct sequel to 2002's Syberia, it is a third-person puzzle-solving game. Although it is stylistically identical, Syberia II improves upon the first game by introducing more realistic character animation. The game includes a recap of the first chapter, so it does not require the player to have experienced the first game.

Syberia II achieved global sales of 600,000 units by early 2006. The game was received favorably by critics.

== Gameplay ==
Kate Walker and a Youki

Like its predecessor, Syberia II is a third-person, mouse-driven adventure game in which the player must solve various puzzles and follow certain procedures in order for the linear storyline to proceed. As a pure graphical adventure game, Syberia follows the guidelines first introduced by LucasArts: it is impossible to die or to get stuck at any moment in the game, which allows the user to become fully immersed in Syberia's universe without the fear of making a mistake or the constant need to save the game.

== Plot ==
Following the events of Syberia, New York law firm Marson & Lormont hires a private detective to track down Kate Walker, their former star attorney who vanished after overseeing the sale of the Voralberg automaton factory in the village of Valadilene. Kate has decided to abandon her old life to help eccentric inventor Hans Voralberg search for the last living mammoths on the island of Syberia (inspired by the real-life location of Wrangel Island in Siberia, the last place on earth where mammoths survived). In the fictional Russian town of Romansburg, Kate helps Hans's automaton train engineer Oscar wind their clockwork train and fill it with coal. On the way, she encounters the inexplicably rude Bourgoff brothers, Ivan and Igor.

Hans falls ill before the train can leave Romansburg, forcing Kate to seek treatment from the monks at a nearby monastery. The monastery's patriarch, believing Hans's obsession with mammoths to be a sign of spiritual degeneracy, refuses to treat him and imprisons Hans and Kate in the monastery. Kate finds the notebook of a monk who extensively studied the Youkol people, a Siberian tribe who apparently built their culture around the frozen remains of prehistoric mammoths. According to the book, the Youkols once received a yearly delivery of fresh mammoth bones on an "ark," which inexplicably stopped arriving one year. After Kate uses the book to treat Hans with Youkol medicine, the pair escape the monastery by using the casket prepared for Hans as a sled.

Back in Romansburg, the train is stolen by Ivan and Igor, who are revealed to be poachers seeking to profit from mammoth ivory. Kate pursues the train in a railroad gangcar, eventually discovering it abandoned at a broken bridge with Oscar still aboard. She manages to reach its location with help from Boris, her aeronaut friend from the first game. Kate and Oscar disconnect the passenger car from the locomotive and catch up to the thieves at the foot of a large mammoth statue. Kate convinces the mentally-deficient Igor to abandon his brother, and learns from him that Hans's whereabouts are unknown. When Ivan attempts to kill Kate, who he believes wants to steal "his" ivory, his attacks break the thin ice under the statue and drop Kate into an underground chasm.

Kate awakens in an underground Youkol village, and reunites with Hans, learning from the local wise woman that he is "trapped in a dream." She acquires prehistoric berries that let her enter Hans's dream, which turns out to be a recreation of Valadilene where Hans has been confined to the attic by his strict father. Kate reaches the young Hans and convinces him to wake up. Knowing that Hans's body is too frail to finish the journey, Oscar sacrifices himself to fulfill his secret purpose -- serving as an exoskeleton and life-support system to allow Hans to continue on. Kate is left with a mechanical heart containing Oscar's personality and memories.

Although the train has reached the end of its tracks, Kate discovers that Hans fitted it with a flamethrower, which thaws out the original Youkol ark. Kate and Hans board the ark bound for Syberia, but it runs aground on an ice floe. As Kate explores the ice to try and dislodge them, Ivan hijacks the ark, intending to abandon Kate and harvest Syberia's mammoths for ivory. Kate sneaks back aboard and uses the sail mechanism to knock Ivan onto the ice, whereupon he is killed by penguins angry his theft of their eggs.

Kate and Hans finally arrive at Syberia, which has an improbably temperate climate and many structures built by the ancient Youkol. Using a set of massive horns, Kate summons a herd of mammoths; Hans joyfully climbs onto the lead mammoth's back and rides away as Kate bids a tearful farewell. Meanwhile, the private detective hired by Marson & Lormont quits, unable to follow Kate beyond the Youkol Village. The law firm, and Kate's family and friends in New York, believe her to have vanished without a trace.

== Development ==
Syberia II was announced in October 2002, and was initially set for an October 2003 launch date. The game was produced in 13 months using Virtools Dev 3.0 development tools. Benoît Sokal indicated in an interview that at one time the development team was considering to create one single game for the entire Syberia story, but decided not to as it was so large.

In September 2003, Syberia II was delayed to the following year. It reached gold status on March 2, 2004, and was released for computers on March 30 in North America. Its Xbox version launched in the region on October 12 of that year. While Syberia II had been released for the PlayStation 2 in European countries by then, this version was rejected for a North American launch by Sony Computer Entertainment. GameSpot's Tor Thorsen said that SCEA's decision was made "due to the adventure genre's lukewarm popularity stateside". The company had previously rejected the PlayStation 2 version of Syberia.

== Reception ==
=== Sales ===
In Germany, Syberia II placed 28th in Media Control's computer game sales rankings for June 2004. According to Edouard Lussan of Microïds, the game achieved sales of 215,000 copies in Europe and the United States combined by that month. Another 100,000 units of its computer version had already been sold in Russia. By late 2005, Syberia II was on pace to reach 600,000 sales overall, a number it had reached by March 2006. Total worldwide sales of the Syberia series surpassed 1 million units by 2008, and rose to 3 million by 2016, before the release of Syberia 3.

=== Reviews and awards ===
Reception

Aggregate scores
Aggregator	Score
GameRankings	79.38%
Metacritic	PC: 80/100; XBOX: 71/100; NS: 68/100

Review scores
Publication	Score
Adventure Gamers	4.5/5
Computer Gaming World	3.5/5
GameSpot	7.8/10
GameZone	8/10
IGN	8.6/10
PC Gamer (US)	71%

Review aggregation website Metacritic reported Syberia II's critical reception as "generally favorable" for its computer release, but summarized that of its Xbox version as "mixed or average".

Syberia II was a nominee for GameSpot's 2004 "Best Adventure Game" award, which ultimately went to Myst IV: Revelation. In 2011, Adventure Gamers named Syberia II the 55th-best adventure game ever released.

== Legacy ==
While Syberia featured a cliffhanger ending, a common complaint among reviewers is that the ending of Syberia II is either too abrupt or too depressing, depending on their understanding of the final scene. Indeed, the game does not provide any clear explanation about what becomes of Kate after she reaches Syberia with Hans. Benoît Sokal had stated in interviews it was at that time unlikely that the third installment would be made.

On 26 November 2012, Microïds revealed on their Facebook page that Benoît Sokal had officially signed a contract with Anuman to write the story of Syberia III and that official development had started. Additionally the project is to be overseen by Elliot Grassiano, the original founder of Microïds. Sokal left Microïds shortly after the release of Syberia II and founded his own company White Birds Productions to release Paradise, a game that uses a similar style of gameplay as Syberia, but is not directly related. A sequel, Syberia 3, was eventually released in April 2017, developed by Microïds and Benoît Sokal.
