= Syberia (video game) =

2002 video game

- Developer: Microïds
- Publishers: Microïds; The Adventure Company (North America, Windows); XS Games (Xbox, North America)
- Director: Benoît Sokal
- Producer: Olivier Fontenay
- Designers: Dominic Mercure; Patrik Méthé
- Programmer: Rémi Veilleux
- Artist: Benoît Sokal
- Writers: Benoît Sokal; Catherine Peyrot
- Composers: Dimitri Bodiansky; Nicholas Varley
- Series: Syberia
- Engine: Virtools
- Platforms: Windows, PlayStation 2, Xbox, Windows Mobile, Nintendo DS, Android, OS X, PlayStation 3, Xbox 360, iOS, Nintendo Switch. PlayStation 5, Xbox Series X/S
- Release: 30 May 2002: Windows; FRA: 30 May 2002; EU: 9 August 2002; NA: 1 September 2002 PlayStation 2; EU: 28 March 2003 Xbox; EU: 6 June 2003; NA: 23 July 2003 Windows Mobile; NA: 2006 Nintendo DS; NA: 25 November 2008 Android; NA: 20 December 2013 OS X; NA: 27 February 2014 PlayStation 3; NA: 2 December 2014; PAL: 3 December 2014 Xbox 360; WW: 3 December 2014 iOS; NA: 4 December 2014 Nintendo Switch; WW: 20 October 2017 Remastered PlayStation 5, Xbox Series X/S; WW: 6 November 2025
- Genre: Graphic adventure
- Mode: Single player

Syberia is a graphic adventure game, developed and published by Microïds, and released for Windows on 30 May 2002, with the game later ported for PlayStation 2, Xbox, Windows Mobile, Nintendo DS, Android, OS X, PlayStation 3, Xbox 360, iOS and Nintendo Switch in later years. Created and designed by Belgian artist Benoît Sokal, Syberia is set in the same world as Sokal's 1999 video game Amerzone. It follows Kate Walker, an American lawyer tasked with overseeing the major sale of a company and her subsequent journey across Europe and Russia to find the brother of the recently deceased owner. Alongside the main plot, the story also consists of a subplot involving Kate's personal life.

Syberia was a commercial success, with sales above 500,000 units worldwide by 2005. It was acclaimed by critics for its intelligent script and use of graphic design that encompassed elements of Art Nouveau and clockpunk fiction. Its success spawned a franchise that incorporates several sequels and comic book adaptations.

In November 2025, a remaster of the game was released for PlayStation 5, Windows and Xbox Series X/S.

== Gameplay ==
Kate and Oscar on the train

Syberia is a point-and-click adventure game played from a third-person perspective, in which the player must solve various puzzles and follow certain procedures in order for the story line to proceed. The gameplay of Syberia includes nonlinear elements which add depth. For example, players may choose the priority in which sub-locations and non-player characters they would like to interact with first, even though each chapter begins and ends the same way.

== Plot ==
The game begins when American lawyer Kate Walker is sent by her law firm to the fictional French village of Valadilène to oversee the corporate takeover of a family-owned spring-automaton toy factory. When Kate arrives, she finds that the recently deceased owner, Anna Voralberg, had informed the village notary before her death that her brother Hans is alive, despite her father claiming he was dead and buried. Realising that Hans is now the owner of the factory, Kate learns she must get his approval in order to allow the takeover to proceed. Investigating the Voralberg estate, she learns that Hans not only exists, but was also injured in a cave outside the village during his youth, while attempting to retrieve a prehistoric doll of a man riding a mammoth. The resulting accident stunted his development, leaving him mentally handicapped and causing him to develop an obsession to find mammoths to ride as the doll depicts. Despite proving extremely creative with making automatons, his father disapproved of his obsession, and disowned him as a direct result.

Learning that Hans lies somewhere further east across the continent, Kate discovers that the only way to reach him is via a specially designed clockwork locomotive, built by Anna at her brother's request, and manning it with a special animatronic man named Oscar. Before leaving, Kate is tasked with retrieving items important to Hans, that Oscar requires before he can allow them to depart – the mammoth doll and two clockwork music boxes. Acquiring all of them, the pair eventually begin their journey eastwards, stopping at Barrockstadt, a failing university. While Kate seeks a means for them to continue, she explores the establishment and soon learns more about Hans's interests in a mysterious tribe of people known as the Youkol, who lived with and domesticated mammoths that reside on the titular island of Syberia (inspired by the real-life location of Wrangel Island in Siberia, the last place on earth where mammoths survived).

Upon moving on, Kate's journey brings her to Komkolzgrad, a dusty communist-era industrial mining complex run by the eccentric and somewhat crazy Serguei Borodine. Finding that he stole Oscar's hands for his automaton organist work, she agrees to help him bring Helena Romanski, a washed-up opera singer who he is obsessed with, back to the complex to sing for him in order to get back the hands. Helping out a drunk test pilot named Boris to fix one of Hans inventions – a clockwork flying machine – Kate gains his assistance in operating an airship that takes her to the Aralbad spa, only to discover that Helena has become disillusioned in believing she is too old to sing, prompting Kate to help her recover.

Returning to the mining complex with Kate, Helena performs for Borodine, only to be imprisoned by him in his desire to keep her at his side as his personal opera singer. Refusing to allow this to happen, Kate rescues Helena, recovers Oscar's hands, and attempts to leave with both via the train. Although Borodine attempts to stop them, Kate makes use of some dynamite to thwart his efforts, killing him in the process, and allowing the train to continue onwards, reaching Aralbad. Upon arriving, Kate finds Hans waiting at the spa, delighted that she has brought him the train and Oscar. Showing little concern for his sister's death, Hans signs the factory release papers without reading them. Before Kate boards a plane that will bring her back to New York, she quickly changes her mind and rushes to rejoin Hans on the train, offering to help him realise his dream, abandoning her job and her unfaithful fiancé back home.

== Development ==
The game was produced entirely in Montreal by 35 people under the direction of Benoît Sokal on a budget of €2 million using Virtools Development Environment 2.1. Its budget was the highest of any Microïds game by that time. Benoît Sokal indicated in an interview that at one time the development team were considering to create one single game for the Syberia story, but decided not to, as it was so large.

Sokal's earlier game, Amerzone, is located in the same fictional universe and Syberia contains some references to it.

== Reception ==
=== Sales ===
Syberia was a commercial success. According to Cedric Orvoine of Microïds, the game surpassed 225,000 units in sales by February 2003, and had achieved nearly 350,000 global sales across its console and computer versions by September. In France, the Agence française pour le jeu vidéo reported that Syberia's computer release had sold 50,000 units by September 2003, before the launch of its console versions. Microïds announced plans that month to ship 50,000 and 20,000 units, respectively, of the PlayStation and Xbox versions in France. In North America, its computer version sold 60,158 retail copies during 2003 alone, and Orvoine noted in early 2004 that its Xbox version was "selling way over our initial expectations" in the region. Michel Bams of Benoît Sokal's White Birds Productions said that Syberia had reached "nearly 500,000 copies" in global sales that February, a number it surpassed by late 2005, according to Ubisoft. However, Jane Jensen noted in 2004 that the game had "not been very profitable" for The Adventure Company, which, among other factors, led to the cancellation of her project Gray Matter. Bill Tiller reported Syberia's sales in the United States as 161,000 units by 2006.

Worldwide sales of the overall Syberia series had topped 1 million units by 2008, and rose to 3 million by 2016, before the release of Syberia 3.

=== Critical reviews ===
Reception

Aggregate scores
Aggregator	Score
GameRankings	PC: 82% XBOX: 73%
Metacritic	PC: 82/100; XBOX: 72/100

Review scores
Publication	Score
Adventure Gamers	4.5/5
GameSpot	9.1/10
GameZone	9/10
IGN	7.1/10

According to The New York Times, Syberia "received euphoric reviews" from critics. Based on 26 reviews, review aggregation site Metacritic estimated the game's critical reception as "generally favorable".

USA Today called the game "a solid pick", and CNN noted that "Syberia brings back adventure genre impressive graphics." Just Adventure called it the "Best Adventure Game at E3". However, it received a negative review from Charles Herold of The New York Times, who wrote that his "faith [in adventure games] is hanging by a thread, because I have been playing Microid's Syberia, the best adventure game of the year, and it's not very good."

=== Awards ===
Syberia was named the best computer adventure game of 2002 by PC Gamer US, Computer Gaming World, GameSpot, GameSpy and—tied with Silent Hill 2—The Electric Playground. It likewise won IGN's "Reader's Choice Award for Adventure Games" (2002). Computer Games Magazine declared it the tenth-best computer game of 2002, and presented it with an award for outstanding art direction. Similarly, the game won GameSpot's "Best Graphics (Artistic) on PC" prize. During the 6th Annual Interactive Achievement Awards, the Academy of Interactive Arts & Sciences nominated Syberia for "Outstanding Achievement in Character or Story Development" and "Computer Action/Adventure Game of the Year". It also garnered the Game Developers Choice Awards' "Excellence in Visual Arts" prize, as well as GameSpot's "Best Story on PC" and "Best Game No One Played on PC" awards.

While awarding the game, the editors of Computer Gaming World called Syberia "the most emotionally rich adventure game since the great Sanitarium and a worthy reminder of how rewarding this struggling genre can be when put in the right hands." PC Gamer's Chuck Osborne praised its visuals and "epic story"; he concluded, "As Kate Walker, not only are you searching for the missing heir to an automaton factory in France, but you're also embarking on a feminist journey of self-discovery."

In 2011, Adventure Gamers named Syberia the 15th-best adventure game ever released.

== Legacy ==
=== Sequels ===
Syberia was followed by a 2004 sequel, Syberia II, which continued Kate Walker's voyage to Syberia. In 2012, Microïds revealed that Benoit Sokal had officially signed a contract with Anuman to write the story of Syberia 3 and that official development had started. Additionally the project was overseen by Elliot Grassiano, the original founder of Microïds. Syberia 3 was released in April 2017. A fourth installment titled Syberia: The World Before was launched on March 18, 2022.

=== Ports ===
Reception

Aggregate score
Aggregator	Score
Metacritic	DS: 52/100; PS3: 50/100; NS: 76/100

In 2006, MC2 France announced that a version of Syberia adapted by Tetraedge Games was released for smartphones using Symbian and Windows Mobile. In 2008, Microïds announced that with Mindscape they would be releasing the mobile version of Syberia for the Nintendo DS in October 2008. On 30 October 2008, they announced that DreamCatcher Games would be publishing the Nintendo DS version of Syberia in North America, for release in December 2008. An iOS version of the game was released in December 2014.

The Nintendo DS port took heavy criticism, receiving a 3.5/10 from GameSpot: most of the voice acting was stripped out and the graphics were simply shrunk down from the PC version which rendered many small plot-necessary objects almost impossible to locate.

=== Remake ===
In May 2025, Microid announced a remake of the game called Syberia Remastered. Developed by Virtuallyz Gaming and Microids Studio Paris, the game features a 3D world, reimagined puzzles, an overhauled user interface, and modernized navigation. It was released on 6 November 2025 for PlayStation 5, Xbox Series X and Series S, and PC via Steam.

== See also ==
- Post Mortem
- Runaway: A Road Adventure
- The Longest Journey
- Escape from Monkey Island
