= Kate Walker (Syberia) =

Syberia protagonist

- Syberia character
- Render of Kate Walker from a promotional art of Syberia 3.
- First game: Syberia (2002)
- Last appearance: Syberia: The World Before (2022)
- Created by: Benoît Sokal
- Voiced by: Françoise Cadol (original, French); Sharon Mann (English)

In-universe information
- Occupation: Lawyer at Marson & Lormont
- Origin: New York, United States
- Nationality: American

Katherine "Kate" Walker is a character from the Syberia video game franchise developed and published by Microids. A lawyer from New York City, she is the central character of franchise media beginning with the first Syberia, where she is tasked with overseeing the purchase of the Voralberg automaton factory on behalf of her employer. She later abandons her assignment, as well as her life and career back in the United States, to accompany the factory's heir in his search for the legendary island of Syberia, a sacred site to a fictional indigenous Siberian tribe known as the Youkols and is said to be home to the world's last surviving mammoths. Subsequent sequels explore the consequences of Walker's life-altering decisions and the personal toll they take on her.

Kate Walker is created by Belgian comic artist and video game developer Benoît Sokal. She is voiced in all media by Sharon Mann in English, and by Françoise Cadol in the original French version. Some commentators regard her as a memorable female video game protagonist with agency, while others have criticized her characterization as bland and her motivations unconvincing. The character is also the subject of academic discourse which explore and analyze the series' underlying themes.

== Concept and design ==
Benoît Sokal has explained his thought process behind Kate Walker's concept as a player character in a number of interviews, such as the promotional video The Making of Syberia. She was deliberately written to demonstrate her ingenuity and ability to solve her problems with her intellect, as opposed to embodying what Sokal perceived to be masculine characteristics, like being physically formidable in battle or the use of weaponry.

Like other characters in Syberia 3, the first entry in the series with fully 3D rendered graphics, Kate Walker was portrayed by a motion actor through performance capture. According to Stéphane Longeard, the CEO of French developer Anuman Interactive, 3D environments offers the character more liberty to move as well as the opportunity for the developers to introduce new or unprecedented gameplay mechanics. She is voiced by Paris-based American actress Sharon Mann in all English language media. In The World Before, Mann adopts a weary and gruff quality for her voice to reflect the hard life and emotional pain endured by the character after the events of Syberia 3. Israeli-American composer Inon Zur is responsible for her theme music in Syberia 3 and The World Before.

== Appearances ==
As introduced in Syberia, Kate is tasked by her employer at the American law firm Marson & Lormont with overseeing the sale of an automaton factory owned by the Voralberg family, Kate Walker arrives in the fictional European city of Valadilene and witnesses the funeral of the factory's recently deceased owner, which is conducted entirely by a troupe of highly advanced automatons. Inside the factory, she meets and befriends a sentient automaton named Oscar. She learns that he is created and designed by Hans Voralberg, the last surviving member of the Voralberg family and heir to the factory, to drive a clockwork train that terminates at an undisclosed location in a Siberian tundra. Walker's subsequent journey across continental Europe and the former Soviet Union to find Voralberg is often interspersed with telephone conversations with her family and friends back in New York City. This eventually led Walker to question her own life choices. Upon meeting Voralberg, Walker decides to abandon her assignment and joins him on the clockwork train to search for Syberia, a legendary island sacred to the Youkol people and said to host the world's remnant mammoth population.

In Syberia II, Walker, Oscar and Voralberg continue on their train journey to search for Syberia and its living prehistoric mammoths. As a consequence of Walker's refusal to return to the United States as well as her decision to cut ties with her employer, fiancé, close friend, and her own mother, she is pursued by a private detective hired by Marson & Lormont. Voralberg's health begins to deteriorate following a stopover, forcing Walker to seek treatment for him at a nearby monastery perched on a clifftop. After she treats Voralberg with an obscure remedy of Youkol origin which she discovered at the monastery, two local men hijack the train and force Oscar to disembark and resume its journey. Walker catches up to the thugs and fends them off following a protracted pursuit. The train eventually reaches what appears to be its end destination in front of a large statue, soon revealed to be the site of a Youkol settlement hidden underground. Once there, Walker learns that Oscar's body is designed to be an exoskeleton to support Voralberg in the event of his ailing health, leaving her with a mechanical "heart" containing Oscar's memories and programming as a keepsake. The Youkol prepares a ship for Walker and Voralberg for their voyage to the island of Syberia, fulfilling the latter's lifelong wish to meet a living mammoth.

In Syberia 3, after abandoning the island of Syberia, a dying Kate Walker is rescued from a makeshift boat by the Youkol tribe. Determined to escape their common enemies, among them a Russian militia unit allied with a corrupt doctor named Olga Efimova as well as the private investigator hired by her former employer, she decides to help the Youkols fulfill their ancestral tradition of leading their snow ostrich mounts on their seasonal migration. Walker and the Youkols depart the town of Valsembor on board a ship named the Krystal, and arrive at an abandoned theme park in Baranour, a town which is devastated by nuclear fallout from a failed nuclear power plant. After finding a disused but intact Voralberg automaton in the park, Walker installs Oscar's mechanical heart into the automaton and revives her friend. Together, they help the Youkols find their lost temple and help navigate them across a bridge to reach a bordering country, where the snow ostrichs' breeding grounds are located. The game ends on a cliffhanger as Oscar is incapacitated by the militia and Walker is captured.

In Syberia: The World Before, Kate Walker escapes from a salt mine; when her friend Katyusha is shot during an escape attempt, she promises her to find out the identity of a girl on a painting with as striking resemblance to Kate. She travels to the city of Vaghen, where she learns that the girl on the picture is Dana Roze, a music student who became involved with alpinist Leon Kobatis, became part of the British Foreign Office during World War II, and eventually emigrated to the United States; Kate eventually discovers that Dana is her real grandmother. The game ends with Kate impulsively abandoning her return to New York and instead going to Baltayar to find out if Dana is still alive.

== Promotion and reception ==
As the central character of the Syberia franchise, Kate Walker is featured in the majority of the series' promotional material. In 2015, an augmented reality app titled Syberia AR - Meet Kate Walker, which allows users to project an animated image of the character, was released as a complimentary download on the Apple Store in 2015 to promote Syberia 3. It was meant to be used for the 56th Venice Biennale at the Glasstress 2015 Gotika exhibition, which was jointly organized by the State Hermitage Museum and Berengo Studio. The Collector's Edition of Syberia 3 includes a poster of Kate Walker, a copy of the comic book adaptation co-written by Sokal and his son Hugo, and a resin figurine of the character flanked by automatons.

Rachel Kaser from TheNextWeb and Catalan publication Ara considered Kate Walker to be part of an emerging trend of realistically clothed and proportioned female protagonists who have become increasingly prominent in the video game industry since the 2000s. Argentinean narrative designer Alejandra Bruno considered Walker to be her favorite character and highlighted her significance as the protagonist of a graphic adventure game in which she shows a strong and empathetic temperament. To Bruno, Walker's portrayal in the Syberia series demonstrated that video games have the potential for "narrating complex, deep events, and of transmitting subtle sensations, such as nostalgia". Walker also has a well-resolved transformation arc through action in Bruno's opinion, which she found interesting from the perspective of a video game's script. Katherine Cross, writing for Boing Boing, argued that Kate is an uncommon example of a female video game protagonist who is allowed agency and full-fledged character development. Cross particularly liked how Walker was written with "grace and maturity" when she discovers her fiancé Dan's infidelity and the way she ends their relationship. Jonathan Kaharl from Hardcore 101 was intrigued by Sokal's exploration in Syberia 3 of the "ever growing need to conform" in the face of "threatening antagonists and sights of modern decay" through Walker and the Youkols, which gives the game a darker undercurrent compared to its predecessors. French website Le Point positively appraised Kate Walker and declared her the opposite of sexualized and combative video game heroines like Lara Croft from the Tomb Raider franchise.

Conversely, Kaharl faulted Kate Walker's presentation in the first Syberia and called her a boring character. He conceded that while it is easy for players sympathize with her because her frustrations are universally relatable to people living in modern society, the character's dialogue lacks personality and that she "does not seemingly to react to the fascinating things she sees". This undermines the game's writing in his opinion and made it "not quite as effective as it should be" when players may not care about her emotional growth beyond their own projections and assumptions. Kaharl thought that she appears to have experienced character growth by the events of Syberia II, but was unconvinced by the reasoning behind her decision to actively pursue Voralberg's dream to find living mammoths, criticizing it as a "deeply unsatisfying explanation". He was also puzzled by the developers' handling of the subplot involving her employer and the private investigator they have hired to pursue her, as the game's story never delivers a satisfactory payoff for that arc. With Syberia 3, Kaharl expressed concerns that Kate's relationship with the Youkols, who are presented as cartoonish stereotypes, comes across as a white savior trope, a sentiment shared by a reviewer from Rock, Paper, Shotgun. Shuva Raha from Adventure Gamers praised Walker as an inspiring heroine who is "practical yet vulnerable" in earlier Syberia titles, but was disappointed by the handling of her character development in the narrative of Syberia 3.

Mann's performance as Walker has received an overall mixed response. Kaharl initially felt Mann was merely competent with her performances as Walker in the earlier Syberia titles. He praised her reprisal of the role in Syberia 3 and said she came across as being very comfortable in the character, "giving every sarcastic barb with perfect precision". Bella Lara Blondeau from CGMagazine praised Mann for bringing an emotional intensity and plainspoken charm to the role, and that she helped make Walker an "immensely likeable protagonist". Raha appreciated the continuity of Sharon Mann reprising her role as Kate Walker and remarked that she mostly sound the same as when she first performed the role years prior. However, John Walker from Rock, Paper, Shotgun found Mann's performance as Walker in Syberia 3, a seemingly elderly voice coming from a woman in her 20s, to be "jarringly peculiar". In a preview article published by Adventure Gamers, Richard Hoover felt that Mann's gruffer and more exhausted voice complements a seemingly renewed focus on Kate's growth as a character in The World Before.

Some critics have adopted a queer reading of Walker's character arc throughout the Syberia series. Aimee Mann calling Walker's unconventional life choices "an excellent allegory for the coming out process" of people who identify as LGBT and a "dramatic break from heteronormative capitalist expectations". Mann noted that Kate shares in a sense of otherness with the new community of friends she gather around herself, just as friends and peers take on a much more significant place in the lives of queer people, who by choosing to live out their own truth are often rejected by their family of origin, or struggle to maintain intimacy and trust. Walker's seemingly intimate relationship with Katyusha in The World Before also led critics to speculate about the presence of LGBT themes in preview articles about the game.

=== Analysis ===
Walker has been the subject of scholarly analysis published in academic journals. Robert P. Fletcher observed that Walker is essentially a female avatar created by a male artist, as demonstrated by his observation of Sokal's paternal pride when discussing his creation's personality. He further noted that reactions from many players have often focused on her physical appearance, in spite of the fact that she is not a sexualized character. He interpreted Walker's relationship with her employers in the first Syberia as representing corporate America's “real world”, and that by abandoning that in order to help Hans Voralberg, Walker "reclaims her own repressed sense of the transcendent". Fletcher also analyzed the theme of robotic behaviour within the context of a potential video game glitch that affects the aesthetics of Walker's character model, as well as an analogy to apathy in the dialogue exchanges between Walker and various non-player characters.

In her analysis of the relationship between the player and their avatar as a form of emotional involvement, Kirsten Pohl said Walker's presentation in the Syberia series as an autonomous character serves as a good example for how the relationship between avatar and player can also be influenced on the narrative level. Since Syberia has a determined game structure and Walker is an "exceedingly defined and personalized avatar" with strong psychological traits, this implies that the player's agency to interpret the game world is left out to a great extent, as the player has little room for deliberation and negotiation. This in turn, encourages the player to adopt Walker's perspective, which offer a new schemata of thinking and acting, and consider the appropriate manner in which she should act in a certain situation that stays true to her personality and find the solution to the given problem.

An essay published in the peer-reviewed journal The Moving Image observed that Kate Walker drives the action in the Syberia series, which is in stark contrast to most fictional works depicting Arctic representations that assume a male subject or a masculinist paradigm, and often involves a solitary journey or a struggle between life and death. On the contrary, Walker is constantly in contact with other characters inhabiting the space, and there is either progress or stagnation as opposed to a "typical player-versus-death scenario". Another observation put forward by the authors was that players may be confronted by other characters’ sexist assumptions about Walker's abilities and motives, and that they must be overcome in order to progress the narrative.
