= Oh My God (2009 film) =

- Theatrical release poster
- Directed by: Peter Rodger
- Written by: Peter Rodger
- Produced by: Peter Rodger
- Starring: Peter Rodger; Ringo Starr; Hugh Jackman; David Copperfield; Seal; Bob Geldof; Baz Luhrmann; Jack Thompson; Princess Michael of Kent; Lawrence Blair
- Cinematography: Peter Rodger
- Edited by: John Hoyt
- Music by: Alexander Bubenheim
- Production companies: Rodger Pictures; Syzygy Productions
- Distributed by: Vision Films
- Release dates: October 16, 2009 (Warsaw Film Festival); November 13, 2009 (United States)
- Running time: 93 minutes
- Country: United States
- Language: English
- Budget: $1 million
- Box office: $38,244

Oh My God (later retitled God: The Almighty Question) is a 2009 documentary film by commercial director Peter Rodger. The filmmaker asked people across the world the question "What is God?" Notable figures interviewed include Ringo Starr, Hugh Jackman, David Copperfield, Seal, Bob Geldof, Baz Luhrmann, Jack Thompson, Princess Michael of Kent, and Lawrence Blair.

The film contains production credit from Rodger's future wife, Soumaya Akaaboune, as well as a special thanks credit to Rodger's son, Elliot.

== Controversy ==
The film is mentioned in the manifesto of Elliot Rodger, the perpetrator of the 2014 Isla Vista killings and son of the film's director, on how his father said he would become rich from the film, but only sent him into bankruptcy.
