= Les Vraies Housewives =

French reality television series

- Genre: Reality television
- Based on: The Real Housewives
- Starring: Soumaya Akaaboune; Christina Amrani; Karine Kaplan; Christine Snider-Decroix; Natalie Wizman
- Narrated by: Françoise Cadol
- Country of origin: France
- Original language: French
- No. of seasons: 1
- No. of episodes: 6

Production
- Production location: Beverly Hills
- Camera setup: 120 minutes
- Production company: TF1 Production

Original release
- Network: NT1
- Release: March 18 – April 1, 2013

Les Vraies Housewives (translated The Real Housewives and abbreviated LVH) was a French reality television show that aired on NT1 on March 18, 2013 until April 1, 2013. Developed as an international installment of the Real Housewives franchise, it aired only one season and documented the personal and professional lives of several French women residing in Beverly Hills, California.

== Overview and casting ==
The series premiered on March 18, 2013 with a cast of five women: Soumaya Akaaboune, Christina Amrani, Karine Kaplan, Christine Snider-Decroix, and Natalie Wizman. It was narrated by Françoise Cadol, a French voice actress and the French voice of Mary Alice Young in Desperate Housewives. During its airing, the French press was very critical of the programme and referred to the series as a "mirror of stupidity." The series was not subsequently renewed and remained a one season series.

== Cast ==
- Soumaya Akaaboune
- Christina Amrani
- Karine Kaplan
- Christine Snider-Decroix
- Natalie Wizman
