= Whirlight - No Time To Trip =

- Developer: imaginarylab
- Publishers: imaginarylab; Vsoo Games
- Platforms: Windows; Nintendo Switch; PlayStation 4; PlayStation 5; Xbox One; Xbox Series X/S
- Release: Windows; May 14, 2026; Switch, PS4, PS5, Xbox One, Series X/S; 2026
- Genre: Point-and-click adventure
- Mode: Single-player

Whirlight - No Time To Trip is a point-and-click adventure game developed by the Italian independent studio imaginarylab and co-published by imaginarylab and Vsoo Games. The game blends comedy and science fiction with a time travel premise, following the eccentric inventor Hector May and the artist Margaret Harck across different eras of the fictional town of Verice Bay. It was released for Windows via Steam on May 14, 2026, with versions for PlayStation 4, PlayStation 5, Nintendo Switch, Xbox One, and Xbox Series X/S planned for later in 2026. It is the studio's follow-up to its 2020 adventure game Willy Morgan and the Curse of Bone Town.

== Setting ==
Whirlight - No Time To Trip is set in Verice Bay, a fictional American coastal town with strong Italian influences, particularly evoking Venice with its canals, gondolas, and a mixture of Gothic, Byzantine, and Moorish architecture. The story begins in the 1960s and later moves through several other time periods and locations, including Verice Bay in the 1990s and an apocalyptic version of the town in the year 2045, as well as more far-flung settings such as a small Sussex town in 1815 and 1895, a prehistoric era 10,000 years in the past, a secret laboratory at the North Pole, a Mediterranean vineyard, and a bar at the edge of space and time.

The central object of the plot is the "Light Squeezer", an invention created by protagonist Hector May that converts rays of natural light into a liquid. By combining the liquid forms of all the colors of the rainbow, the device allows the user to travel through time.

== Gameplay ==
The player controls Hector May and, later, Margaret Harck, exploring locations, talking to non-player characters, collecting and combining inventory items, and solving puzzles to advance the story. The game uses a one-click interface, with the right mouse button serving as a hotspot revealer that highlights interactive objects in the detailed, hand-painted environments. An in-game map allows fast travel between many of the town's locations, while certain areas must still be reached on foot.

The game features two playable characters, and in its later sections the player can switch between Hector and Margaret to take advantage of their different abilities and to exchange inventory items between them. Some segments require manipulating the time of day or progressing time in order to change the positions of characters or the state of the environment. A journal records the player's current objectives. Reviewers estimated a playthrough takes around fifteen hours.

== Plot ==
Hector May is a middle-aged, scatter-brained but brilliant inventor and physicist living in 1960s Verice Bay, whose creations have a habit of ending in failure. After waking from a surreal, inspiring dream, he sets out to build his most ambitious invention yet, gathering the necessary parts by exploring the town. The result is the Light Squeezer, a device that turns light into liquid; unaware of its full capabilities, Hector accidentally transports himself to Verice Bay in the 1990s.

In the 1990s, Hector meets Margaret Harck, a local sculptor who becomes his travelling companion. As Margaret, the player gathers samples of colored light in order to send Hector back to his own time. An accident, however, separates the two across time, and the player alternates between the pair as they journey through a series of different eras and places. Along the way, the goofy, episodic adventure builds toward a larger threat looming over the world, which the duo must avert.

== Development ==
Whirlight - No Time To Trip was developed by imaginarylab, an Italian independent studio previously known for the 2020 point-and-click adventure Willy Morgan and the Curse of Bone Town. Compared with its predecessor, Whirlight is a substantially larger game, roughly three times as long and with more challenging puzzles, while retaining the studio's offbeat sense of humor and world design. The game combines almost photorealistic, hand-painted pre-rendered backgrounds with stylized 3D character models, a style reviewers compared to classic LucasArts adventures such as Day of the Tentacle and Sam & Max Hit the Road, as well as the Syberia (1993) and Runaway (1993) series.

Whirlight - No Time To Trip supports nine languages. Its interface and subtitles are available in English, French, Italian, German, Spanish, Simplified Chinese, Traditional Chinese, Korean, and Japanese, while full voice-over audio is provided in English and Simplified Chinese only. The game features full voice acting, with Jeffrey Machado as Hector and Larissa Crowe as Margaret. It was published by imaginarylab together with Vsoo Games and released for Windows on May 14, 2026 via Steam, with a demo available beforehand. Versions for PlayStation 4, PlayStation 5, Nintendo Switch, Xbox One, and Xbox Series X/S were announced for 2026.

== Reception ==
Reception

Aggregate scores
Aggregator	Score
Metacritic	79/100
OpenCritic	57% recommend (Note: Based on 12 reviews)

Review scores
Publication	Score
Adventure Game Hotspot	92/100
WayTooManyGames	7.5/10

Whirlight - No Time To Trip received "generally favorable" reviews, according to review aggregator Metacritic, which assigned the Windows version a score of 79 out of 100 based on seven critic reviews. Fellow review aggregator OpenCritic assessed that the game received fair approval, being recommended by 57% of critics.

Johnny Nys of Adventure Game Hotspot rated the game 92%, calling it "a wonderful time-travel adventure filled with stunning production values and loads of puzzles that you'll gladly get lost in for days." He praised the combination of cartoon-style characters with photorealistic backgrounds, the two-character gameplay, the soundtrack, and the voice acting, while criticizing the lack of signposting for when repeated actions were required and the absence of inventory items in character animations.

Writing for WayTooManyGames, Dagmara gave the game a final score of 7.5 out of 10, describing it as "point-and-click adventure at its finest" and highlighting its memorable characters, logically grounded puzzles, and pervasive humor, though noting that some animations felt dated. Several critics noted that the game is squarely aimed at fans of traditional point-and-click adventures and that newcomers might find some of its puzzle solutions unintuitive.

== Accolades ==
Prior to its release, Whirlight - No Time To Trip was selected for PAX Rising 2025 and placed in the Top 5 of IndieDB's Player's Choice "Best Upcoming Indie Games". It also won the award for Best Game Narrative at the Chainsaw Game and Music Festival.
