= Mort douce =

Mort douce may refer to:

- La Mort douce, an Inspector Canardo comic album by Benoît Sokal
- Mort Douce Live, a 1996 album by the Japanese experimental band The Gerogerigegege
