= Moroccan Chronicles =

- Directed by: Moumen Smihi
- Written by: Moumen Smihi
- Starring: Aicha Mahmah, Tarik Jamil, Miloud Habachi
- Cinematography: Hélène Delale
- Edited by: Schéhérazade Saadi
- Music by: Mounir Bachir
- Production company: Imago Film International Art Cam International
- Release date: 1999
- Running time: 70 minutes
- Country: Morocco
- Language: Moroccan Arabic

Moroccan Chronicles (French: Chroniques marocaines, Arabic:وقائع مغربية) is a 1999 Moroccan film directed by Moumen Smihi.

== Synopsis ==
In the old medina of Fez, a mother narrates three tales to her son; the first one is about a Jemaa El Fna monkey trainer and three boys. The second, a love encounter between a young man and woman in Essaouira. Then comes the story of an old fisherman from Tangier who is ridiculed by his companions for believing he can find a treasure in the insides of a sea monster.

== Cast ==
- Aicha Mahmah
- Tarik Jamil
- Miloud Habachi
- Soumaïa Akâboune
- Mohamed Timod
