= Sinking Island =

2007 video game

- Developer: White Birds Productions
- Publishers: NA: Microids/Encore; EU: Micro Application
- Designer: Benoît Sokal
- Platform: Microsoft Windows
- Release: FRA: October 4, 2007; NA: August 12, 2008
- Genre: Adventure
- Mode: Single-player

Sinking Island (French: L'Île noyée, lit. 'The Drowned Island') is a third-person perspective adventure game that uses point and click game mechanics. It was released in France on October 4, 2007, and in the United States on August 12, 2008. It was developed by White Birds Productions, a company founded and led by Benoît Sokal.

== Development ==
The title's genesis came from Olivier Fontenay, who suggested that Benoît Sokal make police games. Sokal wrote a ten-page draft in 2005. He decided to have a male playable character to offer a change from his Syberia series. The team created a new interface for the game, entitled PPA (Personal Police Assistant). The game was supported by the Centre National de la Cinématographie. A sequel was originally going to be released, offering a second Jack Norm adventure set in New York.

== Plot ==
The plot is centered on the investigation of the death of a millionaire named Walter Jones. The main acting character in the game is Jack Norm, a police officer entrusted with the task of solving the mystery. The events take place on a fictional island owned by the late Walter Jones in an Art Deco-style tower. The plot takes place over three days and follows a classic murder mystery scheme where a detective needs to uncover the identity of the murderer.

== Critical reception ==
Reception

Aggregate score
Aggregator	Score
Metacritic	68/100

Review scores
Publication	Score
4Players	59%
Adventure Gamers	3.5/5
Gamekult	4/10
GameStar	68%
Gamezebo	70/100
GameZone	6.5/10
IGN	6.5/10
Jeuxvideo.com	15/20

The game received "average" reviews according to the review aggregation website Metacritic. 4Players reviewer Bodo Naser thought that while the game promised a murder mystery akin to those of Agatha Christie, the title did not deliver. IGN offered a mixed review, describing the game as having "weary, stranded-island sleuthing at its soggiest". GameSpot's hands-on preview thought the game would appeal to adventure fans. Gamekult derided the game's difficult puzzles, sleep-inducing dialogue, and lack of plot momentum.
