= George Rodger =

British photographer (1908–1995)

- Rodger in 1941
- Born: George William Adam Rodger; 19 March 1908; Hale, Cheshire, England
- Died: 24 July 1995 (aged 87); Ashford, Kent, England
- Occupation: Photographer
- Organization: Magnum Photos
- Spouses: Cicely Rodger (died 1949); Lois "Jinx" Witherspoon (m. 1952)
- Children: 3, including Peter Rodger
- Relatives: Elliot Rodger (grandson)

George William Adam Rodger (19 March 1908 – 24 July 1995) was a British photojournalist. He was noted for his work in Africa, and for photographing mass deaths at Bergen-Belsen concentration camp during the end of the World War II.

== Early life ==
One of Rodger's photographs taken after the liberation of Bergen-Belsen in 1945.

Born in Hale, Cheshire, of English, Scottish, German and Swiss descent, Rodger went to school at St. Bees School in Cumberland.

== Career ==
He joined the British Merchant Navy and sailed around the world. While sailing, Rodger wrote accounts of his travels and taught himself photography to illustrate his travelogues. He was unable to get his travel writing published; after a short spell in the United States, where he failed to find work during the Depression, Rodger returned to Britain in 1936. In London, he found work as a photographer for the BBC's The Listener magazine. In 1938 he had a brief stint working for the Black Star Agency.

With the outbreak of the Second World War, Rodger had a strong urge to chronicle the war. His photographs of the Blitz gained him a job as a war correspondent for Life magazine, based in the United States. Rodger covered the war in West Africa extensively and, towards the end of the war, followed the Allies' liberation of France, Belgium and Netherlands. He also covered the retreat of the British forces in Burma. He was probably the only British war reporter/photographer allowed to write a story on the Burma Road by travelling on it into China, with special permission from the Chinese military.

Rodger was one of many photographers to enter the concentration camp at Bergen-Belsen in 1945, the first being members of the British Army Film and Photographic Unit. His photographs of the survivors and piles of corpses were published in Life and Time magazines and were highly influential in showing the reality of the death camps. Rodger later recalled how, after spending several hours at the camp, he was appalled to realise that he had spent most of the time looking for graphically pleasing compositions of the piles of bodies lying among the trees and buildings. This traumatic experience led Rodger to conclude that he could not work as a war correspondent again. Leaving Life, he travelled throughout Africa and the Middle East, continuing to document these areas' wildlife and peoples.

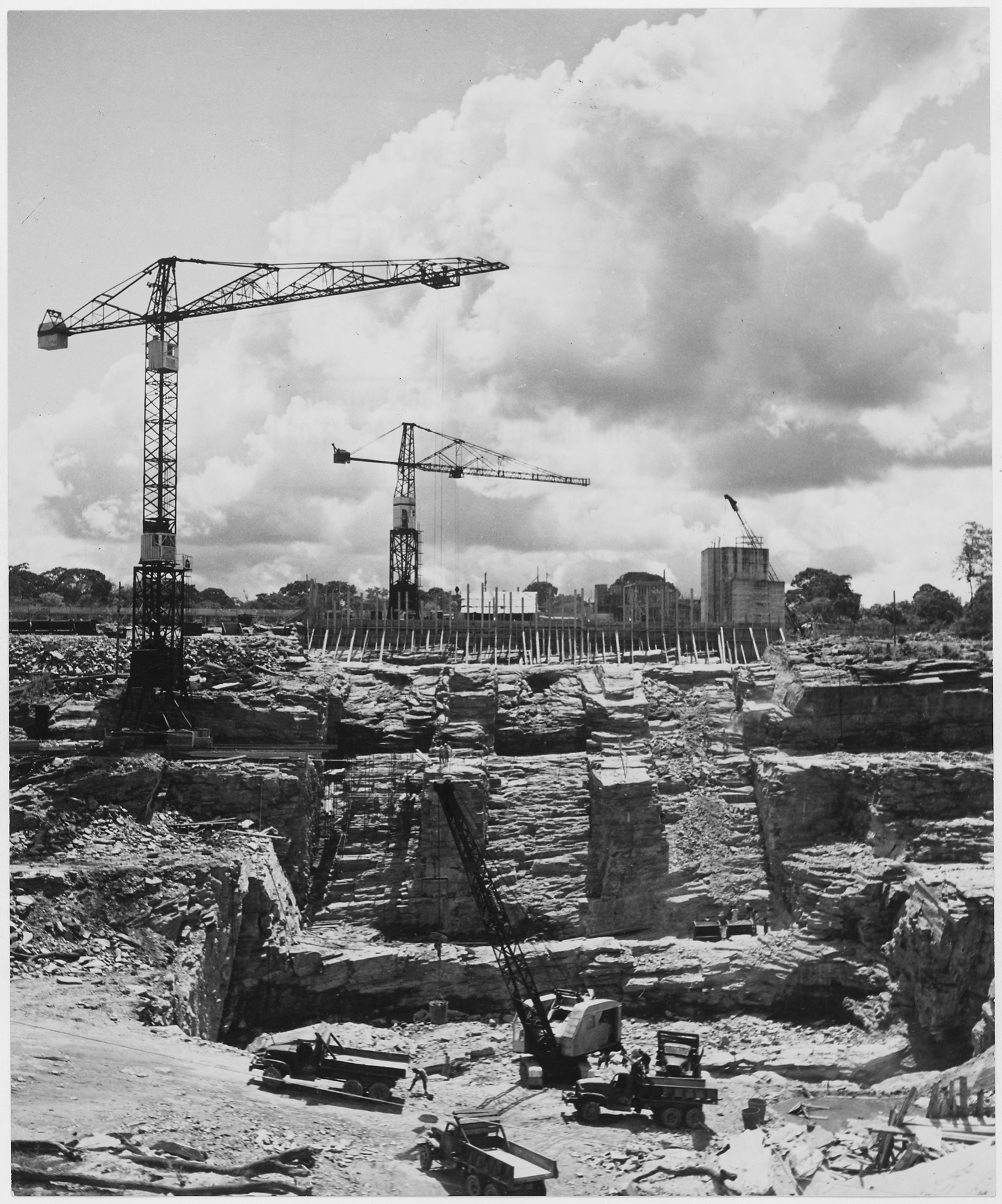
Cameroon, c. 1950

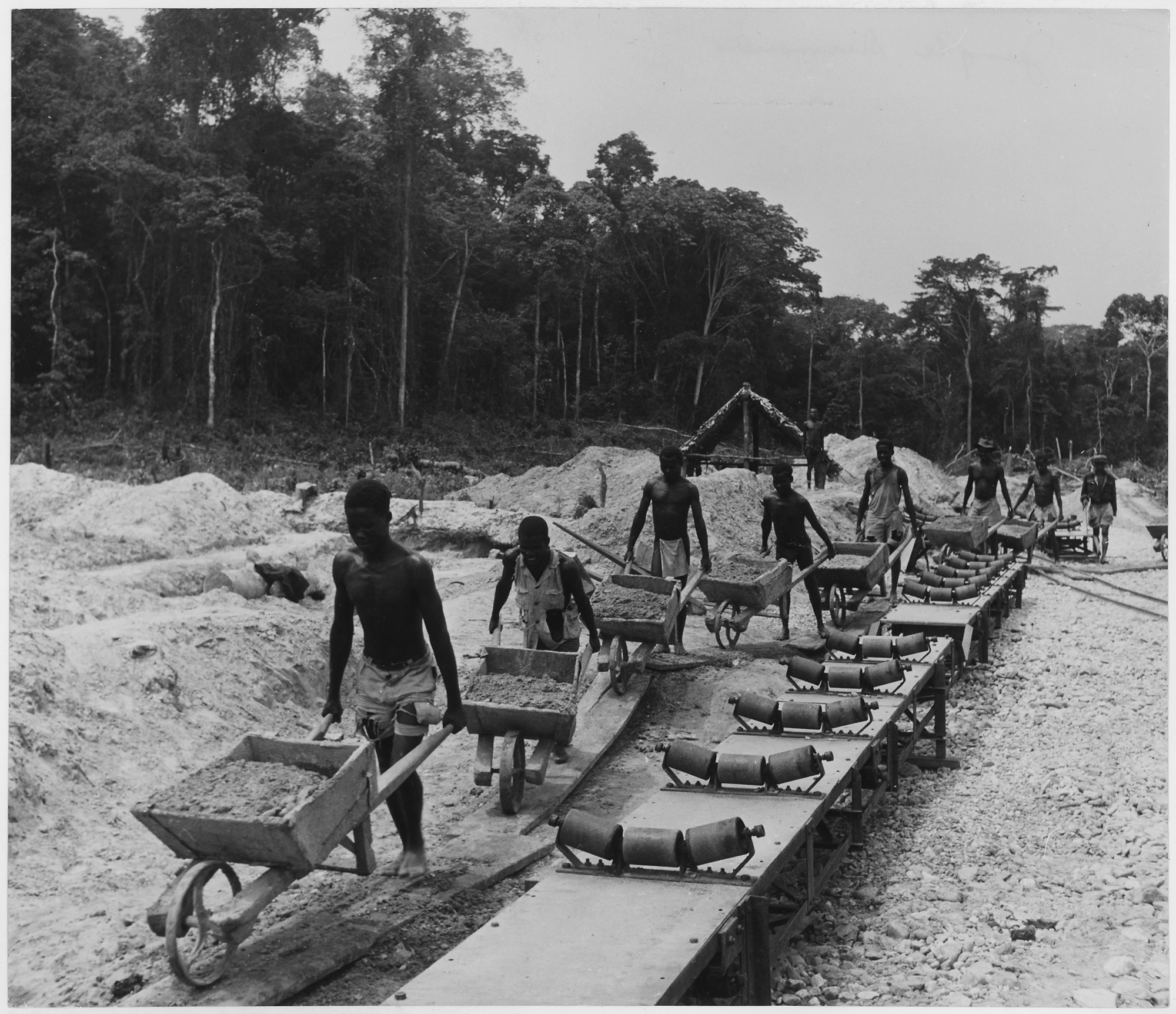
French Equatorial Africa, c. 1950

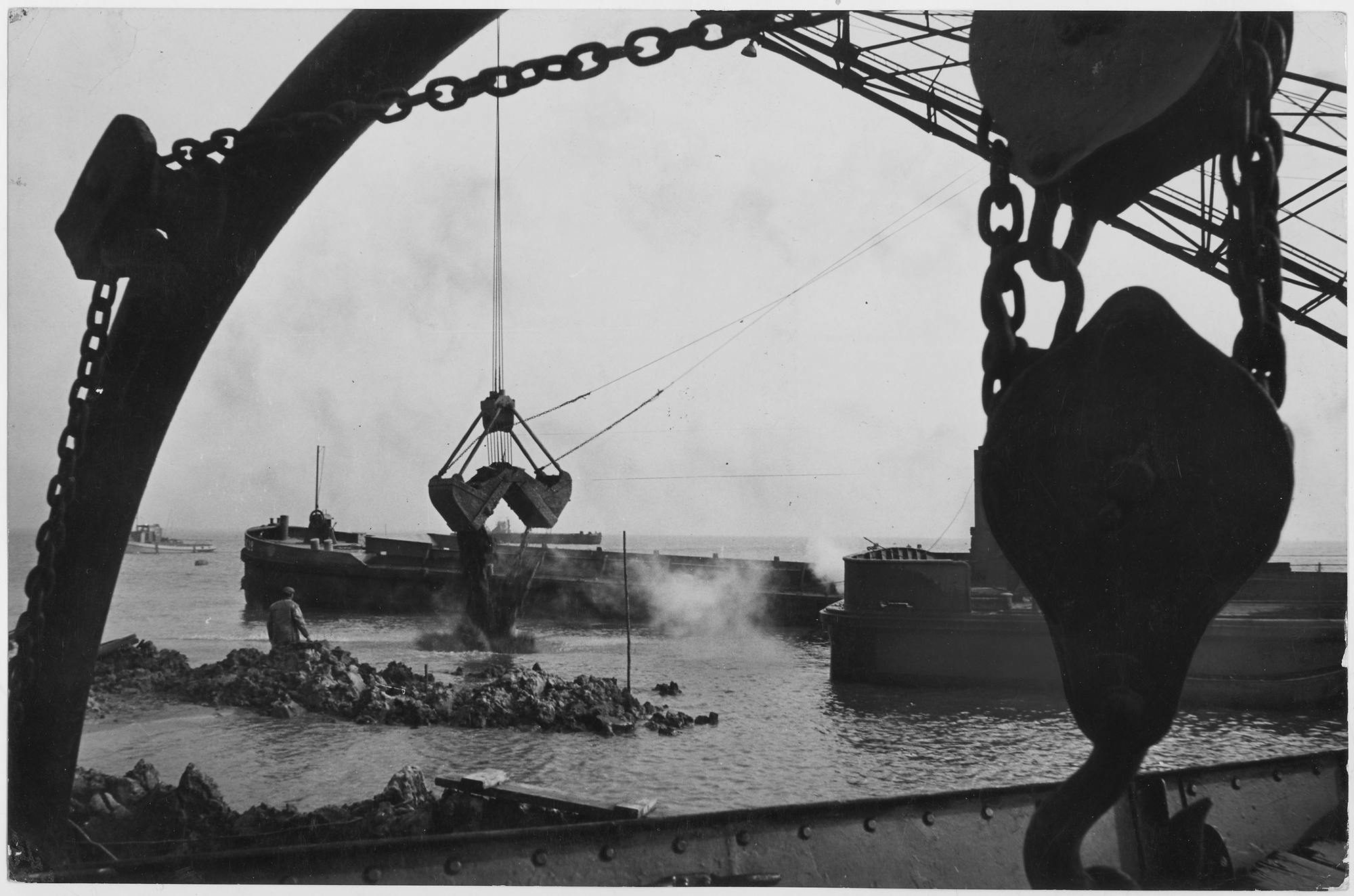
Flevoland, c. 1950

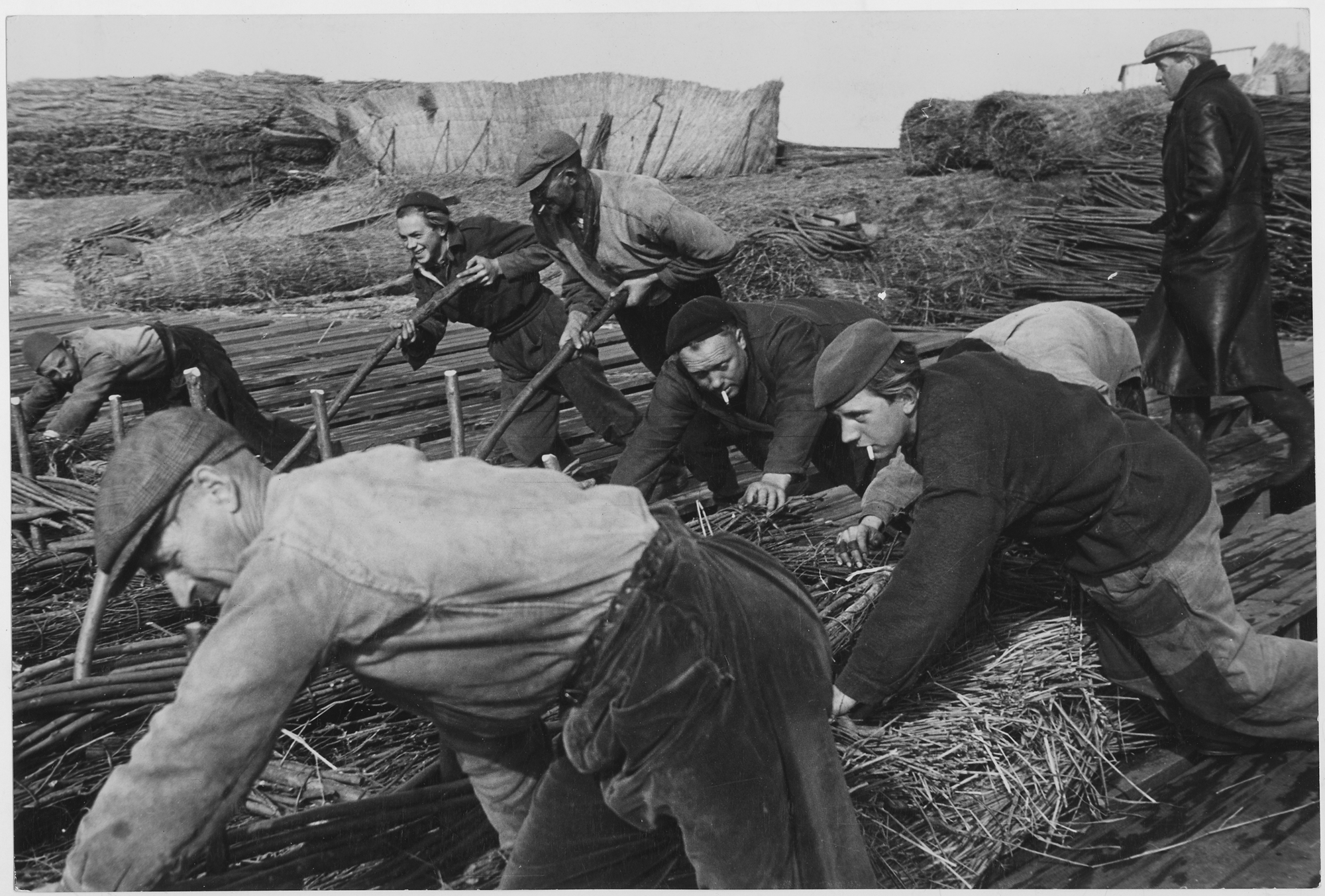
Flevoland, c. 1950

== Founding member of Magnum Photos and work in Africa ==
In 1947, Rodger became a founding member of Magnum Photos. Over the next thirty years, he worked as a freelance photographer, taking on many expeditions and assignments to photograph the people, landscape and nature of African nations. Much of Rodger's photojournalism in Africa was published in National Geographic as well as other magazines and newspapers.

His photographs made in 1948 and 1949 of indigenous people of the Nuba mountains, in the Sudanese province of Kordofan, and the Latuka and other tribes of southern Sudan, have been called "some of the most historically important and influential images taken in sub-Saharan Africa during the twentieth century". As Rodger wrote several years later, "When we came to leave the Nuba Jebels (mountains), we took with us only memories of a people ... so much more hospitable, chivalrous and gracious than many of us who live in the 'Dark Continents' outside Africa." In 1951, Rodger published his photo essay on the Nuba and Latuka also in National Geographic. In the 1960s, his pictures prompted controversial German photographer and filmmaker Leni Riefenstahl to travel to the Nuba mountains for her own photo stories on the Nuba people.

A retrospective exhibition of Rodger's work was held at Imperial War Museum North in 2008.

== Personal life ==
Rodger's first wife, Cicely, who travelled extensively with him in Africa, died during childbirth in 1949. In 1952, he married his American assistant Lois "Jinx" Witherspoon and the pair had two sons, one of whom, Peter, became a filmmaker in Britain. He was the grandfather of Elliot Rodger, who committed the 2014 Isla Vista killings in California, United States, where he killed six people and injured fourteen others before dying by suicide.

== Publications ==
- Red Moon Rising. Cresset Press, 1943.
- Desert Journey. Cresset, 1944.
- Village des Noubas. 1955.
- Le Sahara. 1957.
- George Rodger: Humanity and Inhumanity. 1994.
- Nuba and Latuka. The Colour Photographs. Prestel, Munich, Germany 2017, ISBN 978-3-7913-8322-4.
- Southern Sudan. Stanley Barker, 2018.
