= Syberia: The World Before =

- Developer: Microïds
- Publisher: Microïds
- Directors: Benoît Sokal; Lucas Lagravette
- Producers: Olivier Demangel; Aymeric Manceau; Paul-Elie Hamou
- Designer: Romain Pierson
- Programmer: Loïc Bigot
- Writer: Lucas Lagravette
- Composer: Inon Zur
- Series: Syberia
- Engine: Unity
- Platforms: Windows; PlayStation 4; PlayStation 5; Xbox One; Xbox Series X/S
- Release: Windows; March 18, 2022; PlayStation 5, Xbox Series X/S; November 15, 2022; PlayStation 4, Xbox One; October 15, 2023
- Genre: Graphic adventure
- Mode: Single-player

Syberia: The World Before is a graphic adventure video game developed and published by Microids and the fourth installment in the Syberia series. The game is dedicated to the memory of creator Benoît Sokal, who died during development in 2021.

== Development ==
Syberia: The World Before was announced by Microïds on August 19, 2019, by which time it had already been in development for a year. The game was released for Windows via Steam, Epic Games Store, and GOG.com on March 18, 2022. PlayStation 5 and Xbox Series X/S versions were released on November 15, 2022. PlayStation 4 and Xbox One were released on October 19, 2023, while the Nintendo Switch version has been postponed to 2024.

== Plot ==
The game follows two timeframes with two characters: Dana Roze, a young pianist in the small fictional Central European country of Osterthal, located between Germany, Austria and Switzerland (as shown on a map in Amerzone 2025 remake) in 1937 and Kate Walker, the protagonist of Syberia series, who is now imprisoned in a salt mine in the fictional Eastern European region of Taiga in 2004. Dana graduates from her conservatory by performing the local anthem dedicated to the city of Vaghen, where the fascist Brown Shadow faction (an analogue to National Socialists) have begun to persecute the ethnic minorities and force them into ghettoes.

After the events of the previous title, Kate Walker has been imprisoned as a slave labourer in a salt mine alongside a young Russian woman called Katyusha Spiridonova. Before the day's work, is informed her that Kate's mother, Sarah Walker had died. During their digging, a distraught Kate causes a minor collapse in the mine shaft, revealing a parallel cave, containing a train belonging to a Brown Shadow task force. The pair discovers that the train contains vast amounts of stolen art and antiques, amongst which there is a painting of a young woman almost identical to Kate Walker. Before they could escape with the nearby motorbike, they're confronted by their prison guard, who shoots Katyusha dead and is incapacitated by Kate. With her dying breath, Katyusha asks Kate to track down the girl in the painting.

Kate travels to Vaghen and tracks down the antique shop that sold the music case that housed the painting. While there she also installs the heart of Oscar, Hans Voralberg's automaton engineer, into a Voralberg-designed mechanical armadillo and revives her companion. The trail leads Kate to a remote mountain refuge on the outskirts of Vaghen, occupied by an elderly invalid, Leni Renner. Renner recounts her past with Dana, who had come to the refuge in the summer of 1937 to work as a waitress. The refuge at the time was hosting an expedition in pursuit of a proto-human specimen called the Gorun. The group is guided by a young alpinist named Leon Kobatis, with whom Leni is deeply smitten. After an altercation with Herr Höss, the Brown Shadow officer supervising the expedition, Dana and Leon strike up a romance.

The expedition departs for Baltayar, where the Gorun is theorised to live. As the winter sets in, tensions in the expedition rise due to the lack of success and Leon finds out that some of the members of the group plan on making him the scapegoat for their failure. However, one member of the group, Sauer, finally finds the Gorun. As he runs off to fetch the rest of the group, Leon approaches the creature and strikes up an amicable relationship by tending to his wounds and feeding him his ration of hardtack biscuits. On the other hand, the expedition is far harsher than Leon in their treatment. The creature's wails attract his mother's attention and the group's leader tries to shoot her dead, Leon tackles and accidentally kills him. With the Goruns gone and their leader dead, the group ties up Leon for trial. However, Sauer confides to Leon that he doesn't agree with his colleagues and sets him free, and agrees to send his last letter to Dana.

Dana collapses at the news of Leon. It is revealed that she's pregnant with his child. Her parents, fearing public embarrassment, allow her to be taken to a remote sanatorium by their friends, the Zimmer family. Soon after her departure, the Roze household, as well as the rest of their district, is marauded by the Brown Shadow led by Höss and Dana's parents are murdered in the pogrom. Following this discovery, Kate who had been tracking Dana's whereabouts is encountered by her hitherto elusive neighbour, "Colonel Blake" who turns out to be Frau Junta, a friend of Dana and a British-Austrian double agent who spied on the Brown Shadow on behalf of the British Secret Service during the war. She reveals that Dana's daughter Anna was stillborn and was buried in Baden island in western Vaghen. Following the loss of her child, Junta takes Dana to Britain, where she becomes an operative of the SOE. An assignment reveals that Leon was in fact alive and is operating a resistance network in Vaghen. Dana agrees to be air-dropped into Vaghen and coordinate a dangerous mission.

Kate confronts Leni Renner after three bodies, lost since the war, are retrieved by forensic pathologists. It is revealed that Leon survived the harsh Baltayar winter thanks to the Gorun tribe who took him in. As the war began, Leon returned to Vaghen to fight, and was accompanied by "Ludwig Hardtack", the young Gorun whom he helped before the war. Joined by Leni Renner, they operate out of the winter refuge against the Brown Shadow. Leni had been biding her time for Leon to forget about Dana, whom he believes to have been murdered in the Vaghen pogrom, but Dana turning up alive and rekindling her romance with Leon enrages her. She rats out the network to her father Gustav, a collaborator. The refuge comes under attack and Leon sets out to exfiltrate the civilians as Leni, Dana and Ludwig make a stand to cover them. Leni gets critically injured and as their numbers dwindle, Ludwig goes berserk to slaughter the rest of the attackers. However, just as the fighting ends, an avalanche buries Leon and his charge, the Exners.

Following the war, Dana emigrates to the United States and becomes a renowned pianist. In the 1980s, she's shocked by the confession of a nurse from her time at the sanatorium that the Zimmers, to whom she was entrusted during her labour and later coma, took her baby as their own and lied to her about the stillbirth. She tracks down her now-adult daughter, who is revealed to be Sarah Walker, Kate's mother. Deciding against revealing herself, Dana nevertheless briefly encounters a young Kate and accompanies her as they play the Hymn of Vaghen on her piano. Overcome with the reminiscence and vindicated in her belief that she and Dana Roze were related, Kate finally decides to return to New York with Oscar and mend fences with her loved ones. However, a nearby train bound for Baltayar triggers an epiphany that Dana may have gone there to live amongst the Gorun as she had planned to do with Leon. Running after the outbound train, she's helped aboard by Ludwig, who is also going home after Leni's passing.

== Reception ==
Reception

Aggregate score
Aggregator	Score
Metacritic	81/100

Syberia: The World Before received "generally favorable" reviews according to review aggregator Metacritic.
