= Benoît Sokal =

Belgian comic writer, video game developer (1954–2021)

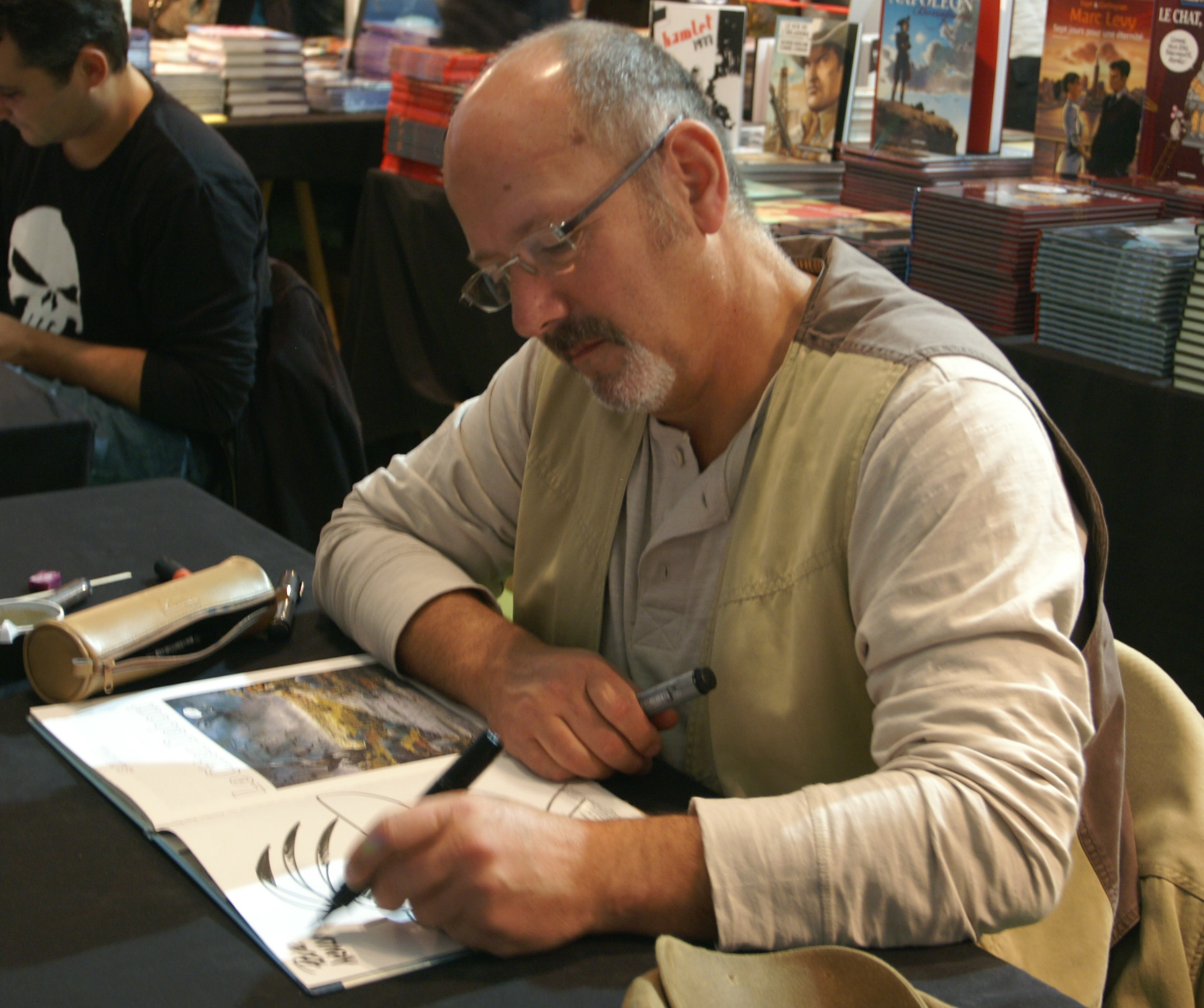
- Benoît Sokal, at the Quai des Bulles festival in Saint-Malo, 2010
- Born: 28 June 1954 Brussels, Belgium
- Died: 28 May 2021 (aged 66) Witry-lès-Reims, France
- Areas: Writer, Artist, Colourist
- Notable works: Inspector Canardo; Syberia
- Awards: full list

Benoît Sokal (28 June 1954 – 28 May 2021) was a Belgian comic artist and video game developer, best known for his comics series Inspector Canardo, and the Syberia adventure game franchise.

== Biography ==
Benoît Sokal was born in Brussels in 1954. According to him, his grandfather was an Austrian General of the cavalry of Ukrainian Jewish origin who had fled to Belgium in 1939 with the help of a German officer he knew since 1914, crossing all of Eastern Europe while surviving the Nazis. Sokal studied at the École Supérieure des Arts Saint-Luc in Brussels, together with many contemporary Belgian comic artists like François Schuiten. He began drawing for À Suivre magazine in 1978. He created the Inspector Canardo series, featuring a depressed anthropomorphic duck detective with a penchant for cigarettes, alcohol and femmes fatales, before working on other titles.

In 1983 he moved to Reims, France. Later he joined the software developer Microïds and designed the adventure games Amerzone, Syberia and Syberia II (published by Microïds, the adventure game label of Anuman Interactive). He then founded his own game company, White Birds Productions, where he created the adventure game Paradise published through Ubisoft.

He died on 28 May 2021 after a battle with long-term illness.

== Bibliography ==
The cover of La Mort douce, an Inspector Canardo adventure originally published in 1982.

- Inspector Canardo, 23 albums, 1981- ; Casterman
- Sanguine, with Alain Populaire; 1988, Casterman
- Silence, on tue!, with François Rivière; 1990, Nathan
- Le Vieil Homme qui n'Écrivait Plus, 1996; Casterman
- Syberia, 1 album, 2002; Casterman (sketches and drawings for the game Syberia)
- Paradise, 2 albums, 2005-, artist Brice Bingono; Casterman

== Video games ==
- Amerzone (1999)
- Syberia (2002)
- War and Peace: 1796–1815 (2002)
- Syberia II (2004)
- Knight's Apprentice: Memorick's Adventures (2004)
- Paradise (2006)
  - Last King of Africa (2008) (Nintendo DS version of Paradise)
- Sinking Island (2007)
- Aquarica (2008) (canceled)
- The Secret Legacy: A Kate Brooks Adventure (2010)
- Syberia 3 (2017)
- Syberia: The World Before (2022, posthumous)

== Awards ==
- 1999: Prix Pixel-INA (category "Games") at the Imagina 99 festival, Monaco
- 2002: GameSpy PC Adventure Game of the Year
- 2003: nominated for the Award for Best Dialogue at the Angoulême International Comics Festival, France
