= Syberia =

Series of video games

- Genre: Graphic adventure game
- Developers: Microids; Anuman Interactive
- Publishers: Microïds; Casterman and Ubisoft (Amerzone); The Adventure Company (North America, Windows); XS Games (Xbox, North America)
- Creator: Benoît Sokal
- Platforms: Windows; PlayStation 2; Classic Mac OS; Xbox; Windows Mobile; Nintendo DS; Android; OS X; PlayStation 3; PlayStation 4; Xbox 360; Xbox One; iOS; Nintendo Switch
- First release: Amerzone; March 18, 1999
- Latest release: Syberia: The World Before; March 18, 2022

Syberia is a franchise of graphic adventure games created by Belgian comic artist and video game developer Benoît Sokal. Set within an alternate universe designed by Sokal and introduced in the 1999 video game Amerzone, the series is currently developed and published by French video game company Microids. The central focus of the franchise, beginning with the eponymous 2002 video game, follows the experiences of Kate Walker, an American adventurer who originally worked as a lawyer in a prominent New York City law firm. In each installment, Walker travels to various fictional locations in continental Europe and former Soviet states during the 2000s, where she encounters fantastical creatures as well as highly advanced automatons powered by intricate clockwork mechanisms.

The first Syberia centers on Walker's efforts to locate and deal with the eccentric inventor Hans Voralberg on behalf of her firm to secure the purchase of his family's factory. By the events of Syberia II, Walker abandons her assignment and accompanies Voralberg in his search for the legendary island of Syberia, which is said to be home to the last surviving mammoths of the world. The franchise features a cast of secondary characters, including Oscar, one of Voralberg's sentient automatons, and Dana Roze, an aspiring pianist introduced in the 2022 video game Syberia: The World Before. Members of a nomadic tribal people indigenous to the geographical area of Siberia known as the Youkols also play an important role in the lore and setting of the series, which combines realistic and surrealistic elements for its tone.

The first two Syberia titles have been commercially successful, with lifetime sales reaching 3 million worldwide by 2016. Both titles have been ported or re-released on multiple platforms ever since their original launches in the early 2000s. Amerzone, the predecessor of the first two Syberia titles, also saw critical and commercial success, especially in France. Syberia 3 was released in 2017 to a mediocre critical reception. The fourth game, Syberia: The World Before, was released in 2022, with generally favorable reviews.

== Games ==
Release timeline
1999	Amerzone
2000–2001
2002	Syberia
2003
2004	Syberia II
2005–2016
2017	Syberia 3
2018–2021
2022	Syberia: The World Before
2023–2024
2025	Amerzone (remake)
2025	Syberia - Remastered
2025	Syberia VR

- Amerzone, also known as Amerzone: The Explorer's Legacy, was first released for PC platforms in 1999. The player assumes the role of a journalist who interviews an elderly French explorer, Alexandre Valembois, in 1999, though much of the plot explores the backstory of Valembois's 1932 expedition to the fictional South American country of Amerzone. While not bearing the series title, it takes place in the same setting as the later games in the series.
- Syberia, the first entry in the series proper, was released for Windows in several territories throughout 2002. It follows Kate Walker, an American lawyer tasked with overseeing the successful financial transaction of an automaton factory owned by the Voralberg family in the fictional European city of Valadilene. This title is later ported to multiple console and mobile platforms across console generations since its original release.
- Syberia II was released for Windows, Xbox and PlayStation 2 in 2004. It continues the story of the first Syberia and follows Kate Walker, who abandons her career and the opportunity to return to the United States, as she accompanies the last surviving member of the Voralberg family in his search for the legendary island of Syberia. Like its predecessor, Syberia II has been ported to numerous platforms since its original PC release.
- Syberia 3 saw a multiplatform release for Windows, OS X, PlayStation 4 and Xbox One in April 2017. It continues Kate Walker's story arc following the conclusion of Syberia II and her subsequent departure from the island of Syberia. She joins the Youkol tribe in their traditional migratory journey as she attempts to evade her pursuers.
- Syberia: The World Before launched worldwide on March 18, 2022 for Windows. It features two main player characters: Dana Roze in the late 1930s, an aspiring pianist and member of a persecuted European ethnic minority; and Kate Walker in 2004, who is forced into indentured servitude at a salt mine following her capture in Syberia 3.
- Amerzone: The Explorer's Legacy, a remake of the original game, was released on PlayStation 5, Xbox Series X/S, and PC on April 24, 2025.
- Syberia - Remastered is a remastered version of the original 2002 Syberia game. The game was released on PlayStation 5, Xbox Series X/S, and PC on November 6, 2025. It features fully redesigned character models and rebuilt environments with updated visuals. The game's puzzles were reworked to provide a more intuitive and streamlined gameplay experience.
- Syberia VR is a virtual reality remake of the original 2002 Syberia game, developed alongside Siberia - Remastered. It was released on Meta Quest on November 13, 2025.

=== Compilations ===
- Syberia Collector's Edition I & II is a compilation of the first two Syberia titles. It was released on April 7, 2008 for PC platforms and PlayStation 3.
- Syberia Collection is a compilation which consists of remastered versions of the first two Syberia games as well as Amerzone. It was meant to be the first pack in the "Adventure Classics" branding used by publisher Iceberg Interactive. It was released for PC platforms on October 30, 2009. A similarly named compilation for the PlayStation 3, which only collects the first two Syberia titles, was offered as a free PlayStation Plus game for December 2017.
- Syberia 1 & 2 is a compilation of the first two Syberia titles for the Nintendo Switch. It was released on November 8, 2018.
- Syberia Trilogy collects the first three games of the franchise as a physical release. It was released on October 31, 2019 for the Nintendo Switch.

== Development ==
The Syberia universe was created and designed by Belgian comic artist and video game developer Benoît Sokal. Each installment in the series has been developed and published by Microids. The development team originally considered developing a single game for Syberia, but decided to develop two separate titles due to the large scope of the project as envisioned by Sokal.

== Adaptations ==
Syberia was first adapted into the comic book format in 2017, with the release of a two-volume graphic novel published by Belgian publisher Le Lombard. It serves as a prelude to the video game series' third installment and offers an "alternative version" of the first game's story, which is centered on Hans Voralberg's backstory as a child in the distant past, with interspersed scenes depicting Kate Walker in the 2000s. The first issue was released on April 20, 2017, and the second issue on October 18, 2017. Sokal and his son Hugo were credited as scriptwriters, with art provided by Johann Blais.

In June 2023, Microids announced an animated series adaptation of the franchise with What The Prod will produce.

== Reception and critical response ==
Aggregate review scores
Game	Metacritic
Syberia	(NDS) 52/100 (NS) 76/100 (PC) 82/100 (PS3) 50/100 (Xbox) 72/100
Syberia II	(NS) 68/100 (PC) 80/100 (Xbox) 71/100
Syberia 3	(PC) 51/100 (PS4) 48/100
Syberia: The World Before	(PC) 81/100 (PS5) 77/100 (XSXS) 82/100

Amerzone was a surprise commercial success. Following its release in France in March 1999, it sold 10,000 units by early May. By June 1999, GameSpot UK concluded that Amerzone had become a "big hit in France". The game generated lifetime sales of 1.5 million copies by 2013.

The first two Syberia titles have been successful commercially and critically. The first Syberia surpassed 225,000 units in sales by February 2003, and had achieved nearly 350,000 global sales across its console and computer versions by September 2003. In France, the Agence française pour le jeu vidéo reported that Syberia's computer release had sold 50,000 units by September 2003. According to Michel Bams of Sokal's White Birds Productions, it reached "nearly 500,000 copies" in global sales that February, a number it surpassed by late 2005, according to Ubisoft. By 2006, Syberia's sales in the United States reached 161,000 units. Following its launch in March 2004, Syberia II reached sales of 215,000 copies in Europe and the United States combined two months later. Its PC version also saw some commercial success in Russia. By late 2005, Syberia II was on track to reach 600,000 sales overall, a number it had reached by March 2006. Worldwide sales of the overall Syberia series had topped 1 million units by 2008, and rose to 3 million by 2016, before the release of Syberia 3.

The first two Syberia titles received praise from critics following their initial launches, although reviews of console ports for the original Xbox and Nintendo Switch were less enthusiastic. The Nintendo DS and PlayStation 3 ports of the first Syberia in particular received criticism over significant technical issues or perceived quality. The third installment received an unfavorable critical reception, with a consensus among reviewers that it is not up to par with its predecessors in terms of overall quality. The World Before received generally positive reviews from reviewers, with some reviewers lauding the title as a return to form for the series.
