= Catch the Wind (2017 film) =

2017 film

- Film poster
- French: Prendre le large
- Directed by: Gaël Morel
- Written by: Gaël Morel; Rachid O.
- Produced by: Anthony Doncque; Miléna Poylo; Gilles Sacuto
- Starring: Sandrine Bonnaire
- Cinematography: David Chambille
- Edited by: Catherine Schwartz
- Music by: Camille Rocailleux
- Production company: TS Productions
- Distributed by: Les Films du Losange
- Release date: 8 September 2017 (TIFF)
- Running time: 103 minutes
- Country: France
- Language: French
- Box office: $322,000

Catch the Wind (French: Prendre le large) is a 2017 French drama film directed by Gaël Morel. It was screened in the Special Presentations section at the 2017 Toronto International Film Festival.

== Synopsis ==
Edith, a 45-year-old textile worker, has to choose when the bosses of her factory in Villefranche-sur-Saône decide to relocate the company to Morocco. Unattached since her son left, she is the only worker who agrees to leave in order to avoid unemployment, and so she arrives in Tangiers. She will be confronted with many trials, but will discover friendship.

== Cast ==
- Sandrine Bonnaire as Édith Clerval
- Mouna Fettou as Mina
- Ilian Bergala as Jérémy (Édith's son)
- Kamal El Amri as Ali (Mina's son)
- Soumaya Akaaboune as Madame Saïni
- Nisrine Erradi as Karima
- Farida Ouchani as Najat
- Lubna Azabal as Nadia
- Nathanaël Maïni as Thierry (Jérémy's partner)
