= Françoise Cadol =

French actress

Françoise Cadol (born 4 December 1963) is a French actress, singer and playwright.

== Career ==
She trained at the Paris drama school Cours Simon alongside Niels Arestrup and Denise Noël.

=== Theatre ===
She has written several plays. Her first was Chop Suey in 2002, inspired by the painting of the same name by Edward Hopper. In 2021 she adapted the Grégoire Delacourt novel La femme qui ne vieillissait pas for stage and played the role of Betty. In 2022 she wrote, directed and appeared in Une Nuit avec Monsieur Teste.

=== Dubbing and voice over work ===
Cadol has regularly provided the French voice for actresses such as Sandra Bullock, Angelina Jolie, Michelle Yeoh, Tilda Swinton, Winona Ryder, Toni Collette, Rose Byrne, Brenda Strong, Patricia Arquette, Sharon Stone and Melinda McGraw.

She has played the French language version of numerous anime roles, including Roodaka in Bionicle 3, Tenar in Tales from Earthsea, Yasuko Kusakabe in My Neighbor Totoro, and Kokiri in Kiki's Delivery Service. Since 2016 she has dubbed the voice of Catwoman in numerous films from DC Comics.

She is known for providing her voice to several video game characters, most notably that of Lara Croft in the Tomb Raider series between 1996 and 2008, as well as the spin offs Lara Croft and the Guardian of Light and Lara Croft and the Temple of Osiris. She is the voice of lawyer Kate Walker in the Syberia game and its sequels, and Madison Page in Heavy Rain.

She has provided voice over for several television advertisements, including campaigns for Auchan, Gaz de France and BMW. In 2021 she was the voice of the adverts for the French contract tracing app, TousAntiCovid.
