= Peter Rodger =

British filmmaker (born 1965)

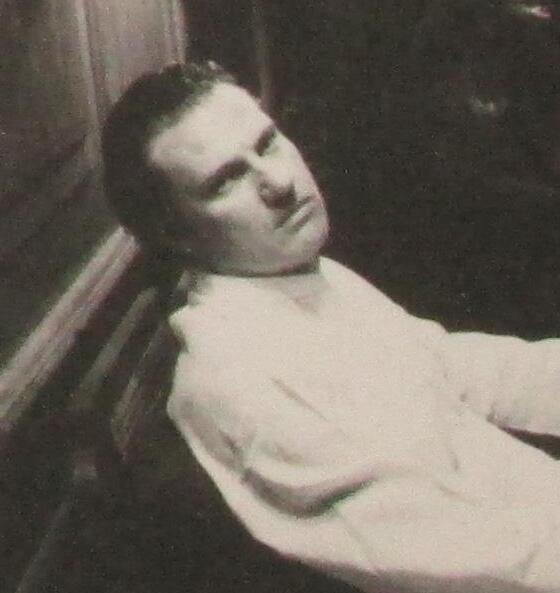
- Rodger in an undated photo
- Born: Peter Anthony Rodger; 6 April 1965 (age 61); Tenterden, Kent, England
- Education: Maidstone College of Art
- Occupations: Filmmaker; photographer; commercial director
- Notable work: Oh My God (2009)
- Spouses: Ong Li Chin (div. 1998) Soumaya Akaaboune (m. 1999)
- Children: 3, including Elliot
- Parent: George Rodger
- Website: Official website

Peter Anthony Rodger (born 6 April 1965) is a British filmmaker, photographer, and commercial director.

== Early life ==
Rodger was born on April 6, 1965, as the second son of British photojournalist George Rodger and Lois "Jinx" Rodger (née Witherspoon).

== Career ==
Rodger is known for his 2009 documentary film Oh My God, as well as for his work as a second unit director on The Hunger Games (2012). He is the recipient of accolades from the Houston International Film Festival, Chicago International Film Festival, Telly Awards, the Mobius Awards, and US International Film and Video Festival.

== Personal life ==
Rodger married Ong Li Chin, a Malaysian Chinese nurse who worked on film sets and later a research assistant for a film company. They had two children, Elliot (1991–2014) and Georgia (b. 1995).

In c. 1996, Rodger moved together with his family from the United Kingdom to California. In 1998, he divorced his wife, Li Chin. In 1999, after his divorce, Rodger married Moroccan actress Soumaya Akaaboune, with whom he had his third child and second son, Jazz.

On May 23, 2014, his elder son, Elliot, murdered six people and injured fourteen others in Isla Vista, California, then killed himself. Afterwards, Peter gave several interviews to shed light on the incident and Elliot's upbringing.

== Filmography ==
Year	Title	Role
2009	Oh My God	Director, producer, writer, narrator, cinematographer
2012	The Hunger Games	Second unit director
2018	Glimpsed	Director, producer, writer, cinematographer
2024	It's Time...	Director
