= Knight's Apprentice: Memorick's Adventures =

2004 video game

Memorick: The Apprentice Knight
- Cover art
- Developer: MC2 France
- Publishers: FRA: Microids; NA: XS Games
- Platform: Xbox
- Release: FRA: April 16, 2004; NA: June 15, 2004
- Genre: Platformer
- Mode: Single-player

Knight's Apprentice: Memorick's Adventures is a 2004 video game developed and published by Microids for the Xbox. Inspired by Arthurian legend, the game is an action-adventure game in which players undertake a quest to free Avalon from the legendary Morganna, her brother Mordred and Queen Maab. The game was distributed by XS Games as a budget release, being sold at a much lower price than other titles. Upon release, Knight's Apprentice received average to mixed reviews, with critics noting the game's simplicity, difficult control scheme and lack of variety.

== Gameplay ==
A screenshot of gameplay in Knight's Apprentice.

Knight's Apprentice is an action-adventure game in which players control Memorick and explore eleven levels set across eight worlds. The game follows a simple control scheme in which players attack using a sword and defend using a shield, with an additional combinations including a shield bash and special powers when weapons and shields are upgraded, and can perform different types of jumps to traverse platforms. The game features a simple health system, replenished by potions, which can be found by players when unlocking chests throughout levels. Players progress by collecting orbs throughout levels, which can be used to unlock leylines that transport to new areas. Once the player retrieves an Oracle Stone, they can see the locations of objectives on the world map and the number of orbs in a given area. In some stages of the game, players are able to navigate by riding on horseback or griffin, or riding down water courses on their shield.

== Plot ==
Knight's Apprentice is set on the fabled island of Avalon, where the Goddess Queen Mab oversees the lands and magical forces of the world. As the era of gods wanes, Mab refuses to relinquish her throne, and summons a horde of dragons in a great war against King Arthur and the wizard Merlin. Arthur is victorious, and Merlin uses all his powers to imprison Mab inside a magical crystal of holding. After a decade, Memorick, a young pupil of Merlin, longs to become a knight, and is tasked to save the world when Arthur's half-sister Morganna and her brother Mordred raise an army to attack Avalon and unleash Mab.

== Critical reception ==
Reception

Aggregate score
Aggregator	Score
Metacritic	53/100

Review scores
Publication	Score
GameSpot	5.6
IGN	5.7
Official Xbox Magazine (US)	4.9/10
TeamXbox	5.8
Xbox Nation Magazine (XBN)	3/10

Knight's Apprentice received "mixed or average" reviews according to review aggregator Metacritic, with an average score of 53%. Several reviewers critiqued the simplicity and limited features of the gameplay. IGN faulted the game's "basic" controls and "basic and easy to predict attack patterns" of enemies. Team Xbox similarly critiqued the "very simplistic" gameplay mechanics, also citing the gameplay's "basic controls" and lack of challenge and variety to enemies and attack patterns. GameSpot faulted the game's "lack of challenge", citing a tendency for the game to rely on "extremely simple patterns" of button mashing in combat and imprecise platforming. Official Xbox Magazine critiqued the game's "basic set of abilities" in combat and "redundant gameplay". Electronic Gaming Monthly also critiqued the tedium of the game's twenty minute introduction sequence due to its unskippable cutscenes. Similarly, Xbox Nation faulted the game's reliance on "fetch-and-carry" quests, which it dismissed as "boring familiar ground".

Some critics expressed a more sympathetic view of Knight's Apprentice in spite of the game's faults. IGN found the game to display "flashes of old-school goodness" in its "simple, uncomplicated but enjoyable" design, writing that "the platforming brought me back to the days of yore when leaping from platforms was tricky and frustrating, but ultimately addicting in some strange way". Team Xbox similarly wrote that they were "drawn in by the old school look and feel" of the game, comparing the game to titles on the Nintendo 64. Several critics also noted that the game's limitations were in part explained as it received a budget release.
