= Inspector Canardo =

Comic book series

Publication information
- Publisher: Casterman
- Format: Graphic Novel
- Genre: Detective/Adventure
- Publication date: 1978
- No. of issues: 25
- Main character: 1 (Inspector Canardo)

Creative team
- Written by: Benoît Sokal
- Artist: Benoît Sokal

Inspector Canardo is a comics series created by the Belgian artist Benoît Sokal. He was named after the French noun canard, which means "duck".

== History ==
Sokal created the character Inspector Canardo after graduating from Institut Saint-Luc, at the age of 20. He first drew his comics for the magazine À Suivre, but after the comic became popular, they were published as albums by Casterman.

== Characters ==
=== Canardo ===
The eponymous character and the protagonist of the series, Canardo is an anthropomorphic strange duck who has a career as a private investigator. While he is seldom seen on paid assignments, he tends to end up in dangerous situations everywhere. He is also often used as a pawn in bigger schemes because of his expendability. He suffers from severe personal problems, including vast consumption of beer to forget the unfortunate events he has gone through. While Canardo is quite skilled both in armed and unarmed combat, he is more of an everyman than a traditional hero.

Canardo has died, at least seemingly, several times. Most of these happen in the comics written for À Suivre. In the first incident, Canardo is about to be lynched by an angry crowd when he falls in a pit filled with urine, where he supposedly drowns. In the next comic, he is alive and well. Later, he is shot to death after being tricked by Clara. Canardo jokingly refers to this incident in the next comic, claiming that the "blood" was actually tomato sauce. In the last short comic, Canardo commits suicide, although this presumably happens chronologically after all other adventures. In the album La Fille qui rêvait d'horizon (1999), Canardo's Cadillac collides with Rasputin's motorbike, causing an explosion that is implied to have killed both Canardo and Rasputin.

=== Clara ===
One of the first recurring characters in the series, Clara is a femme fatale stork whose lust for power has led her to do extreme things. In her first appearance, she uses Canardo to kill a mobster cat named Fritz, resulting in Canardo being shot. Despite the hostility between the two, they apparently have romantic feelings for each other, although this is less evident in Clara's later appearances. Like Canardo, Clara has survived several evident deaths.

=== Rasputin ===
Rasputin is a huge, violent evil mystic cat who lives in Siberia. He and his band of raiders have terrorized Siberian villages for years. Rasputin is obsessed with immortality, and has his assistant prepare numerous medicines to slow down his natural aging. When he learns that one of his supposedly dead daughters is alive, he decides to abandon his potions and instead find the daughter and make her his successor. After the plan fails, he blames Canardo, sparking hostility between the two.

== Albums ==
=== 0. Premières enquêtes (1979) ===
English title: First Investigations

This album is a compilation of the shorter comics originally published in a comic book magazine, À Suivre. The loose story arc includes Canardo attempting to solve various crimes, him being used as a tool of political scheming, as well as the complex relationship between Canardo and Clara. The story arc ends tragically when Canardo, now married and settled down, kills himself outside the pub by shooting himself in the head.

These comics featured humans, who are considerably larger than the animal characters, and don't seem to notice the anthropomorphic traits of the animals. Humans were seen rarely in the other albums.

=== 1. Le Chien debout (1981) ===
English title: A Dog's Life

Canardo isn't the main protagonist of this album, but rather a background influencer, or Éminence grise. The story features a dog working to stop a mad doctor who performs animal experiments, while investigating the murder of his girlfriend, for which everyone blames him.

This is one of two albums that were officially published in English, under two different titles: Shaggy Dog Story and A Shabby Dog Story.

=== 2. La Marque de Raspoutine (1982) ===
English title: The Mark of Rasputin

Rasputin, an evil mystic whose raiders have plagued Siberian villages for years, sends a messenger to Europe to find his daughter. After the messenger gets injured by Rasputin's enemies, Canardo, inspired by the beauty of Rasputin's daughter, agrees to help escort her to Rasputin. Matters are complicated by Clara, who is Rasputin's mistress, who isn't willing to share Rasputin's love with his daughter, and is willing to do anything to stop the reunion.

Rasputin, one of Canardo's enemies, appears for the first time in this album.

=== 3. La mort douce (1983) ===
English title: A Silent Death

Canardo, depressed after the trip to Siberia, witnesses a brutal homicide as Bronx, a bear, kills a customer of the pub despite normally being harmless, being too stupid to be angered. The violent outburst is caused by Lili Marleen, a song sung by a pub singer. Canardo sets off to find Bronx and discover the connection between the song and Bronx's behavior.

This is one of two albums that were officially published in English, as Blue Angel.

=== 4. Noces de brume (1985) ===
English title: The Return of Rasputin

Rasputin is found alive, although weak and blind. When he is being transported in a wagon by a father and a daughter in East Europe, Rasputin escapes, causing the local population to equip themselves with firearms and begin hunting for this beast.

This album is the last to feature humans. The story is somewhat more mystical than in other albums, for example featuring a pact with the devil.

=== 5. L'Amerzone (1986) ===
English title: The Kingdom of the White Birds

See also Amerzone

=== 6. La Cadillac blanche (1990) ===
English title: The White Cadillac

=== 7. L'Île noyée (1992) ===
English title: The Sinking Island

=== 8. Le Canal de l'angoisse (1994) ===
English title: The Canal of Anguish

=== 9. Le Caniveau sans lune (1995) ===
English title: The Gutter with No Moon

=== 10. La Fille qui rêvait d'horizon (1999) ===
English title: The Girl who Dreamed of the Horizon

Canardo's car breaks, forcing him to stay in a service station that is soon attacked by motorist gangsters, led by Canardo's enemy, Rasputin.

=== 11. Un misérable petit tas de secrets (2001) ===
English title: A Filthy Little Pile of Secrets

Canardo is tasked by a family to locate the gold bars their late grandfather stole from the Nazi government during his French Resistance days. Canardo is given a portable time machine (a rare occurrence of futuristic elements in the comics) to help him discover the location of the gold.

=== 12. La Nurse aux mains sanglantes (2002) ===
English title: Innocent

=== 13. Le Buveur en col blanc (2003) ===
English title: The White-Collar Sot

Canardo attempts to solve a mystery surrounding the death of a respected wine critic.

=== 14. Marée noire (2004) ===
English title: A Black Tide

An oil tanker Canardo is on is attacked by a revolutionary faction, who threaten to release the oil into the ocean unless their demands are met.

=== 15. L'Affaire belge (2005) ===
English title: The Belgian Affair

=== 16. L'Ombre de la bête (2006) ===
English title: The Shadow of the Beast

Canardo is on a bus trip, which is interrupted when one passenger shoots the driver, and threatens to detonate the bus and the people inside it with a bomb tied to his waist. The criminal is fickle, and Canardo as well as the other passengers are having a hard time not aggravating him.

=== 17. Une Bourgeoise fatale (2008) ===
English title: A Lethal Gentlewoman
