= White Birds Productions =

French Game-Developer

- Industry: Video games
- Founded: 2003
- Defunct: 2011
- Headquarters: Joinville-le-Pont, Paris, France
- Key people: Benoît Sokal; Olivier Fontenay; Michel Bams; Jean-Philippe Messian
- Services: Computer and video game development
- Number of employees: 25

White Birds Productions was a French video game developer. White Birds was founded by Benoît Sokal, Olivier Fontenay, Jean-Philippe Messian and Michel Bams in August 2003. White Birds specialised in adventure games but also handled other work, such as synthetic image creation, comics and merchandising.

The four founders had previously worked together at another French video game company, Microïds, producing Amerzone, Syberia and Syberia II. Microïds has since maintained connections with the company, for example by publishing Sinking Island.

White Birds Productions was based in the Paris suburb of Joinville-le-Pont (94) and employed 20 people. White Birds was a member of the PlayAll project, a middleware cross-platform created in collaboration with other game studios and university laboratories.

The company was shut down late 2010 due to financial problems mostly caused by a cancelled/unpaid for project.

== Games ==
White Birds primarily developed PC games, but they also worked with other consoles such as the Nintendo DS and the iPhone/iPod Touch.

=== PC ===
Title	Release date	Notes
Paradise	2006	
Sinking Island	4 October 2007	
Nikopol: Secrets of the Immortals	10 September 2008	Adaptation of The Nikopol Trilogy: La Foire aux immortels.
Aquarica	Cancelled	
Broadway	Cancelled	

=== Nintendo DS ===
Title	Release date	Notes
Emma at the Farm	2007	Adaptation of Martine books.
Emma at the Mountain	February 2008	Adaptation of Martine books.
Last King of Africa	Mid-2008	Mobile adaptation of Paradise.
Crime Scene (also known as Criminology)	16 February 2010	

=== iPhone/iPod Touch/iPad ===
Title	Release date	Notes
Upside Down	10 December 2009	
Babel Rising	9 February 2010	
SocCars	11 February 2010	
Last King of Africa (released as 3 episodes)	July 2010 (Episode 1)	Mobile adaptation of Paradise.
