= Paradise (video game) =

2006 video game

- Developer: White Birds Productions
- Publishers: FRA: Micro Application; NA: Ubisoft; Focus Home Interactive (DS)
- Director: Benoît Sokal
- Producer: Olivier Fontenay
- Designer: Benoît Sokal
- Platforms: Windows, iOS, Nintendo DS
- Release: Windows: EU: April 21, 2006; NA: April 27, 2006; DS: EU: November 14, 2008; iOS: NA: July 6, 2010 (Episode I); NA: August 3, 2011 (Episode II)
- Genre: Adventure
- Mode: Single-player

Paradise is a 2006 adventure game by White Birds Productions, a company formed by Benoît Sokal, based on a novel by Sokal. In 2009, the game was re-released in North America under the title Paradise: The Season of Storms.

== Gameplay ==
The game, like many classic point-and-click adventure games, is viewed from a third-person perspective and is mouse-driven, with the player clicking on locations for the main character to move to and objects to examine or pick up, among other actions.

== Plot ==
The central protagonist of Paradise is a young woman called Ann Smith, the daughter of King Rodon, the dictator of the fictional African country of Maurania. Ann is in Europe when she hears that her father is seriously ill, but while she is en route to see him, her aircraft is shot down by rebels. She is rescued, but when she regains consciousness she cannot remember her identity or what she is doing in Africa.

== Releases ==
Focus Home Interactive and White Birds released a remake of the game for the Nintendo DS in Europe on November 14, 2008, renaming the title Last King of Africa.

An iOS version was released for the United States as Episode I: Madargani on July 6, 2010, followed by Episode II: Deep Maurania on August 3, 2011.

It is available for digital purchase through Big Fish Games.

== Reception ==
Reception

Aggregate score
Aggregator	Score		
Aggregator	DS	iOS	PC
Metacritic	55/100	65/100	57/100

Review scores
Publication	Score		
Publication	DS	iOS	PC
1Up.com	N/A	N/A	D+
Adventure Gamers	N/A	N/A	3.5/5
Game Informer	N/A	N/A	5.25/10
GameSpot	N/A	N/A	5.8/10
GamesRadar+	N/A	N/A	3.5/5
GameZone	N/A	N/A	7.8/10
IGN	N/A	N/A	6.2/10
NGamer	50%	N/A	N/A
PC Gamer (US)	N/A	N/A	79%
X-Play	N/A	N/A	2/5

The game received "mixed" reviews on all platforms according to video game review aggregator website Metacritic.
