= Soumaya Akaaboune =

Moroccan actress (born 1974)

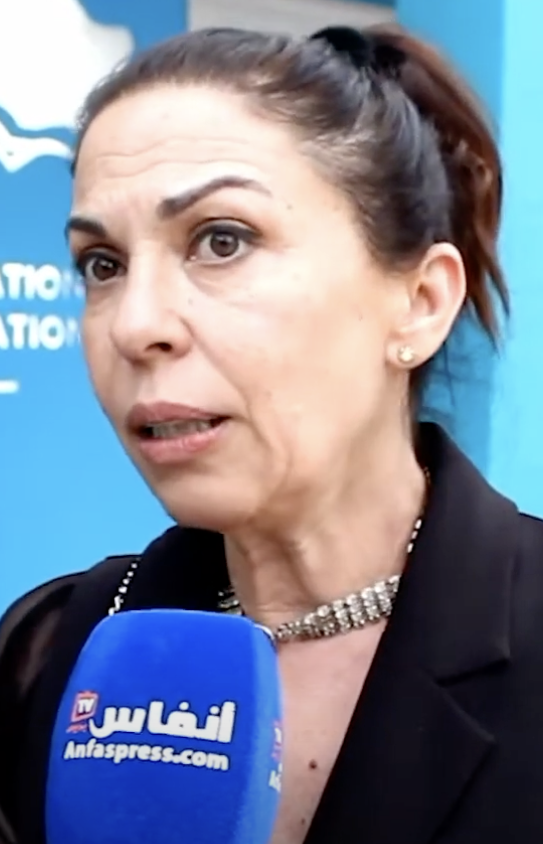
- Akaaboune in June 2022
- Born: 16 February 1974 (age 52); Tangier, Morocco
- Occupation: Actress
- Years active: 1987–present
- Spouse: Peter Rodger (m. 1999)
- Children: 1
- Relatives: Elliot Rodger (step-son)

Soumaya Akaaboune (Arabic: سومية أكعبون; born 16 February 1974) is a Moroccan actress.

== Early life ==
Akaaboune was born and raised in Tangier, Morocco. Her mother was a stylist and costume designer while her father was an art lover. She described her childhood home as a sanctuary for artists and those in need. At the age of 14, Akaaboune was spotted by the choreographer Maurice Béjart, who invited her to join his dance troupe. She accepted and trained for eight hours a day, a period which she said was the happiest of her life. Akaaboune toured Europe, dancing in Paris, then Spain and London. During her time in London, she turned her attention to theater, performing in several musicals. She snapped her Achilles tendon in 1989, ending her dancing career. In London, Akaaboune met Sandra Bernhard, who invited her to perform on her show "Up All Night" and later her Broadway show "I'm Still Here ... Damn It!"

== Career ==
Akaaboune trained in acting at the Loft Studio. In 2010, she starred opposite Matt Damon in the film Green Zone. Akaaboune had roles in the romantic comedy Playing for Keeps in 2012 and the biopic Lovelace in 2013. She was one of the five housewives profiled on the 2013 French show Les Vraies Housewives. Between 2015 and 2016, Akaaboune starred as Fettouma in the popular soap opera Wadii, directed by Yassine Ferhanne. Her character is a bourgeois woman who refuses to accept injustice, and the show received 7 million views per episode. In 2019, she played Marcelle in the TV series The Spy.

== Personal life ==
Akaaboune met film producer Peter Rodger in 1999. The pair subsequently married and had a son, Jazz. Akaaboune was the stepmother of Elliot Rodger, the perpetrator of the 2014 Isla Vista killings. The two had a strained relationship, and Elliot had planned to murder Akaaboune shortly before the killings. She returned to Morocco at the end of 2014.

Akaaboune speaks French, Arabic, English and Spanish.

== Filmography ==
Films

- 1987: Dernier été à Tanger
- 1999: Moroccan Chronicles
- 1999: Esther
- 2010: When the Voices Fade (short film): Leila
- 2010: Green Zone: Sanaa
- 2012: Playing for Keeps: Aracelli
- 2013: Lovelace
- 2013: Djinn
- 2017: Catch the Wind: Madame Saïni
- 2017: Looking for Oum Kulthum

Television

- 2013: Les Vraies Housewives
- 2015–2016: Waadi: Fettouma
- 2017–2018: Rdat L'walida: Faty Kenani
- 2019: EZZAIMA
- 2019: The Spy: Marcelle
- 2020: Bab Al Bahar: Zineb
