= Amerzone =

1999 video game

- European Windows cover art
- Developers: Microïds; Anuman Interactive (iOS, OS X)
- Publisher: Microïds
- Director: Benoît Sokal
- Producers: Olivier Fontenay; Jean-François Coremans
- Designers: Benoît Sokal; Emmanuel Dexet; Eric Brouillat
- Programmers: Emmanuel Dexet; Sébastien Guillaume
- Artist: Benoît Sokal
- Writer: Benoît Sokal
- Composers: Knockin' Boots Productions; Inon Zur (Remake version)
- Series: Syberia
- Engine: Phoenix VR
- Platforms: Windows, Classic Mac OS, PlayStation, iOS, OS X, PlayStation 5, Xbox Series X/S
- Release: Windows: EU: 19 March 1999; NA: 18 October 1999; Classic Mac OS: EU: 1999; PlayStation: EU: 13 December 1999; iOS: EU: 6–7 Jun 2011; OS X: EU: 4 October 2011; Remake; PlayStation 5, Xbox Series X/S, Windows: WW: 24 April 2025
- Genre: Adventure
- Mode: Single-player

Amerzone (also known as Amerzone: The Explorer's Legacy, French: L'Amerzone: Le Testament de l'explorateur) is a first-person fantasy graphic adventure game developed and published by Microïds and designed by Benoît Sokal, who based it on his 1986 Inspector Canardo comic strip L'Amerzone. Amerzone was originally released for Microsoft Windows, the classic Mac OS and PlayStation in 1999, and re-released for iOS and Android in 2014 by Anuman Interactive, who had bought out Microïds in 2009. A remake was released in 2025.

Like the comic, the game tells the story of a French explorer, Alexandre Valembois, who goes on an expedition to the mysterious South American country of Amerzone. There, he discovers many fantastical animals including a species of magical White Birds, who require human intervention for their survival. These become threatened when a friend of Valembois turns Amerzone into a brutal dictatorship, and Valembois endeavors to rescue the endangered species. The game adds a journalist as the player character, who continues Valembois's quest as the man nears death.

Amerzone received generally positive reception. It was praised for its atmosphere and visuals, with critics claiming that it lent it a poetic and dreamlike quality; while criticism targeted the sound, controls, and difficulty. It was a great commercial success, with over 1 million copies sold in its original release. The game's setting became the foundation of Sokal's Syberia series, and is the namesake for the video game development company he co-founded White Birds Productions.

== Synopsis ==
=== Setting ===
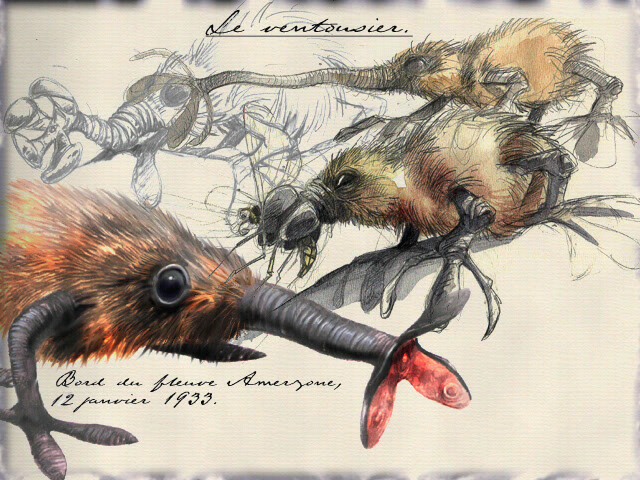
An in-game illustration of the ventousier. Animals in Amerzone add fantastical traits onto real-life creatures.

The world of Amerzone interweaves fact and fiction. "Amerzone" itself is the name of a fictional region in South America and the great river that runs through it. The name, and the lush tropical rainforest in the Amerzone, suggest that it is inspired by the real-life Amazon rainforest. Valembois lives in a lighthouse on the fictitious Langrevin peninsula in Brittany. (Note: As stated in a letter to Valembois from the Museum, found in the lighthouse)

The game veers further into the realm of fantasy once the player enters Amerzone. The country is home to many strange plants and animals, depicted through watercolor sketches in Valembois's exploration journal. The flora comprises mostly herbaceous plants such as the orchid-like Orcochi. Animals in the Amerzone tend to resemble real-life animals, but with bizarre flourishes: the ventousier resembles a shrew, but its snout branches off into sucker-bearing arms; the rhinopotamus resembles a cross between a rhinoceros and hippopotamus (perhaps it is a horned relative of Toxodon); the giraffe-like web-footed giraffe (perhaps a camelid) navigates the marshlands with its webbed feet.

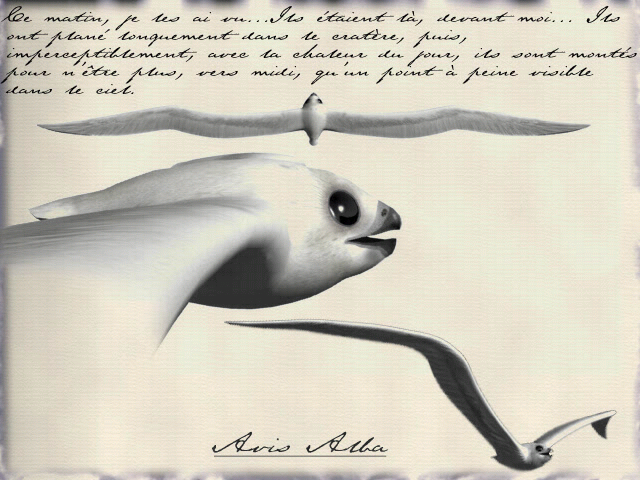
The White Birds give the game its poetic and dreamlike quality.

The White Birds are the key plot point of the game. The Birds are born legless and as such spend their entire lives gliding over the thermals issuing from a great volcano, sustaining themselves on a diet of flying insects. (Note: As stated in the letter Valembois gives to the journalist) Their wings keep growing after the rest of their bodies has stopped, such that they end up disproportionately long. The Birds' limited range threatens their survival, as does their method of reproduction: every three years, a single, enormous egg is laid, containing many embryos. However, the volcano's fumes will naturally make the eggs "ill", such that they will hatch as Black Birds. Only a nearby indigenous tribe, the Ovo-volahos, knows how to "cure" the eggs to make them hatch as White Birds. Most Amerzonians believe the White Birds to merely be a fanciful myth.

=== Characters ===
- The journalist: The player character; a faceless, nameless, silent protagonist. Has virtually no identity: all that is known is they were assigned by their employer, Mondial Magazine, to interview Valembois about the Amerzone.
- Alexandre Valembois (voiced by Michel Barbey): Born in 1904, (Note: As stated in Valembois's journal) he studied natural history in Paris. Fascinated by the biology of Amerzone, he goes on a scientific expedition there from 1932 to 1934. There, he encounters and becomes enamored with the White Birds, and finds love in a native girl called Yékoumani. When he brings back one of the White Birds' eggs, the scientific establishment laughs it off. After World War II, he gets a career as a lycée professor. When the player character meets him in 1998, he is exhausted and tormented by his past mistakes, and can only think of returning the egg to Amerzone.
- Antonio Alvarez (voiced by Marc Moro): An Amerzone native who befriends Valembois in 1929 while studying law. A lover of his native land, he accompanies Valembois on his expedition, and stays behind after his friend returns to Europe. Wishing to modernize the country, Alvarez spearheads a coup d'état. The patriot turns into a cynical dictator, corrupted by power and leading his once-beloved country into ruin.
- David Mackowski (voiced by Luc Gentil): A Jesuit who also accompanies Valembois to Amerzone, being equally fascinated by the place. He unwisely attempts to convert the Amerzone natives to Catholicism. Like Valembois, by 1998 he is filled with regret and sadness over his mistakes and what has become of Amerzone under Alvarez's rule. (Note: As stated in a letter from Mackowski to Valembois, found in the lighthouse)

=== Plot ===
The game proper begins in 1998 with the journalist's interview of Valembois, but much of the plot is backstory about Valembois's 1932 expedition.

==== 1932–1934: The Valembois expedition ====
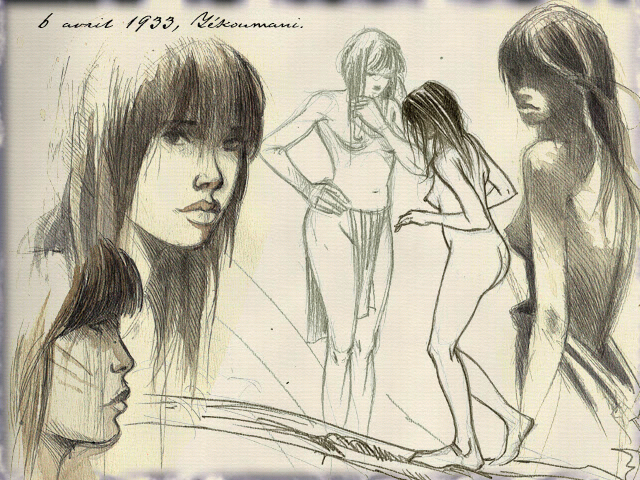
Concept art of the indigenous girl Yékoumani, Valembois' love interest

Alexandre Valembois, a zoology buff fascinated by Amerzone, lobbies the National Museum of Natural History in Paris to fund an expedition to discover the exotic flora and fauna mentioned by Antonio Alvarez. The Museum grants his wish in 1932, and he devises a watercraft called a Hydraflot to get to and around the country. Valembois, Alvarez, and the Jesuit David Mackowski set out on October 22 of that year, (Note: The dates given are inconsistent: the journal claims Valembois left in October 1932, but Valembois's letter gives a departure date of June. A photograph of the expedition dated July 1932 can also be found on the island. According to Amerzone: Strategies & Secrets (page 40) the October date is canonical and the others are mistakes.) finding their way by following the migrating Amerzone geese. On the way, the Hydraflot is damaged by a sperm whale, so they make the rest of the trip on a Peruvian whaling vessel.

They set foot in Amerzone on Christmas Day, and make their way to the former trading post of Puebla. Valembois begins sketching and studying the wildlife. On New Year's Day, he learns of the White Birds from one Luis Angel, and decides to pursue the lead despite widespread disbelief in the creatures. He hires Angel as a guide and rows up the Amerzone River, going it alone after Angel abandons him on February 18. On the 22nd of the month, he discovers a native tribe—the Ovo-vohalos—but hesitates to make contact. That night, he contracts a debilitating illness, and is nursed back to health by the comely native girl Yékoumani. They grow very close, and upon his recovery a month later, begins designing labor-saving machines for the tribe.

On June 1, a young tribesman returns from the nearby mountains with a large White Bird egg, thus convincing Valembois of their existence. He takes part in the ceremony to cure the egg so it will hatch as healthy White Birds. Promising to Yékoumani that he will return, he heads for the mountains the next day. Making his way through a swamp and an ancient temple, he reaches the Birds' volcanic home on the 18th. In his zeal for scientific recognition, he steals an egg and returns to Puebla, thus betraying Yékoumani and the tribe.

In France, however, the scientific community dismiss the find as a hoax, perhaps an oversized ostrich egg. The Museum fires him for bringing ridicule upon them, and after a stint as a lycée professor, he holes up in a lighthouse in Brittany, all the while longing for Yékoumani and wallowing in guilt over his betrayal. Meanwhile, Alvarez has seized power in Amerzone and turned the country into a despotic dictatorship. His ties to the Museum now severed, Valembois independently builds a new Hydraflot with which to return to Amerzone with the egg, but comes to realize that he is too old and weak for the journey.

==== 1998: The journalist ====
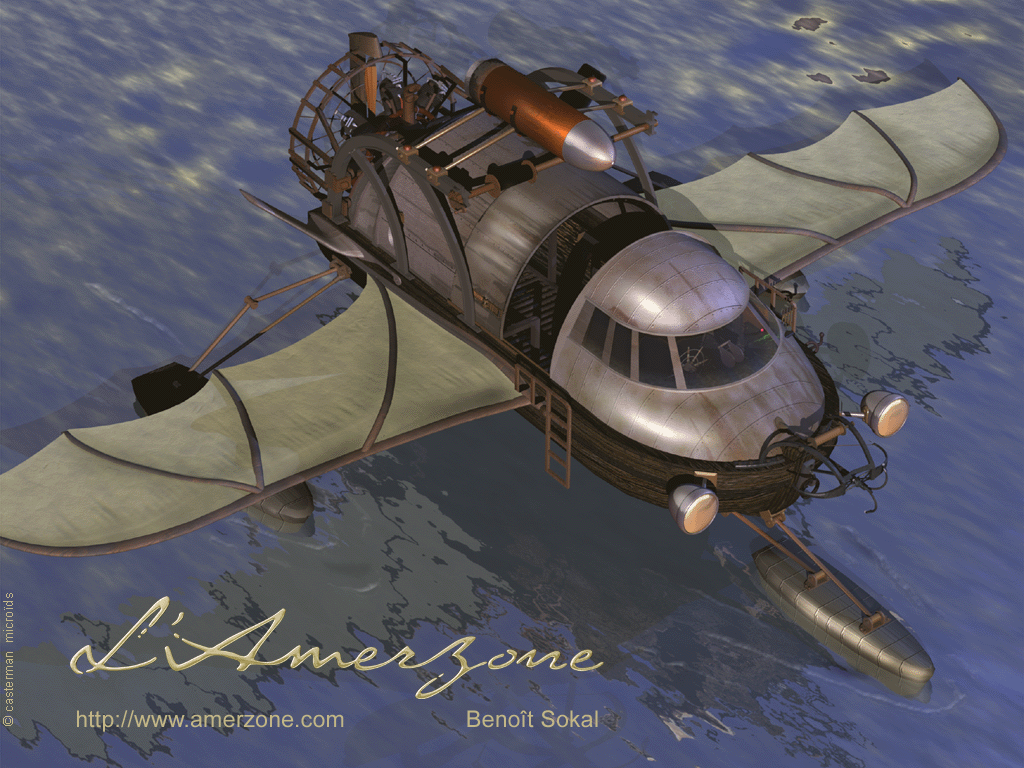
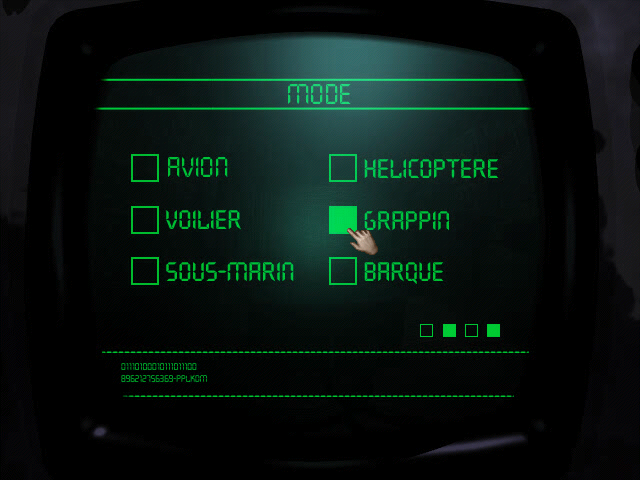
The Hydraflot is the player's only means of transportation. The player must always be on the lookout for extra fuel and floppy disks which allow it to switch between different configurations.

In 1998, the player character—a journalist—is assigned to interview Valembois. The old man confesses that he is dying, and beseeches the journalist to travel to Amerzone with the egg and safeguard the White Birds. He entrusts him with a letter and his old expedition journal, and the newsman sets out in the new and upgraded Hydraflot. The vehicle now uses programs on floppy disk to switch between different configurations. (Note: According to Amerzone: Strategies & Secrets, the disks the player runs into were mailed to Amerzone by Valembois.) It is also equipped with a grappling hook. He leaves to the journalist his old expedition journal, containing all his observations on Amerzone wildlife, and a candid letter detailing his experiences.

The journalist sets sail, and stops to refuel at the same island where Valembois ran into the sperm whale. An ultrasonic repellent keeps the craft safe, but a disoriented whale ends up tangled in a fishing net. The journalist manages to free it, and finds a disk that turns the Hydraflot into a helicopter. After fueling up, he heads for Puebla. In the once-lively, now heavily militarized village, he encounters an aged Mackowski who tells him that a despondent Yékoumani committed suicide in 1935. Mackowski wishes to aid the journalist in his quest, but Alvarez has him assassinated and the journalist captured to cover up the existence of the Birds. The journalist manages to escape, fuels up and locates a disk which lets him go up the Amerzone river.

On his way upstream, he discovers the plants and animals mentioned in Valembois's journal. A collision with a three-horned buffalo damages the Hydraflot so badly that only the grappling hook is left functioning, and the journalist must pull himself from rock to rock until he reaches the Ovo-volaho village. He narrowly escapes death when the hook catches on an ill-tempered rhinopotamus. At the village, he has the egg cured, acquires a new disk and rides one of Valembois's contraptions to get above some waterfalls that are in the way.

He thus reaches the swamp, but not before the Hydraflot is knocked over and finally put out of commission. The egg thus becomes lost in the mazelike swamp. The journalist finds a whistle in a pile dwelling, which lets him call and ride a web-footed giraffe deeper into the swamp. After finding the egg, he climbs a great tree and crosses a rope bridge into the temple Valembois had written of. There, he encounters Alvarez, who threatens to kill him but doesn't have the strength left for it. Further on, he rides a primitive hang glider which takes him to the volcano's rim. He sets the egg down and it hatches the White Birds, thus accomplishing Valembois's dying wish.

== Gameplay ==
The player pans around the prerendered view in a typical screen of Amerzone.

Amerzone plays like a typical first-person point-and-click adventure game. The player flips between panoramic "screens", which can be panned around to view the game world. Certain elements can be interacted with by clicking on them. To progress in the game, the player must solve puzzles, which may involve talking to people or using items collected throughout the game. Some items are not required for puzzle-solving, but instead serve to flesh out the game's plot: this is the purpose of the explorer's journal and Valembois's letter. The game has a resource management component in the Hydroflot: the player must constantly be on the lookout for fuel and floppy disks required to keep the vehicle running.

The game's mobile port modified some gameplay elements. An optional hint system was added to get struggling players back on track, and certain puzzles were redesigned in an attempt to limit tedious back-and-forth travel between locations. Since iOS devices use touchscreens for input, the controls were redesigned: objects are highlighted with clickable icons, and the camera can be controlled by tilting the device.

== Development ==
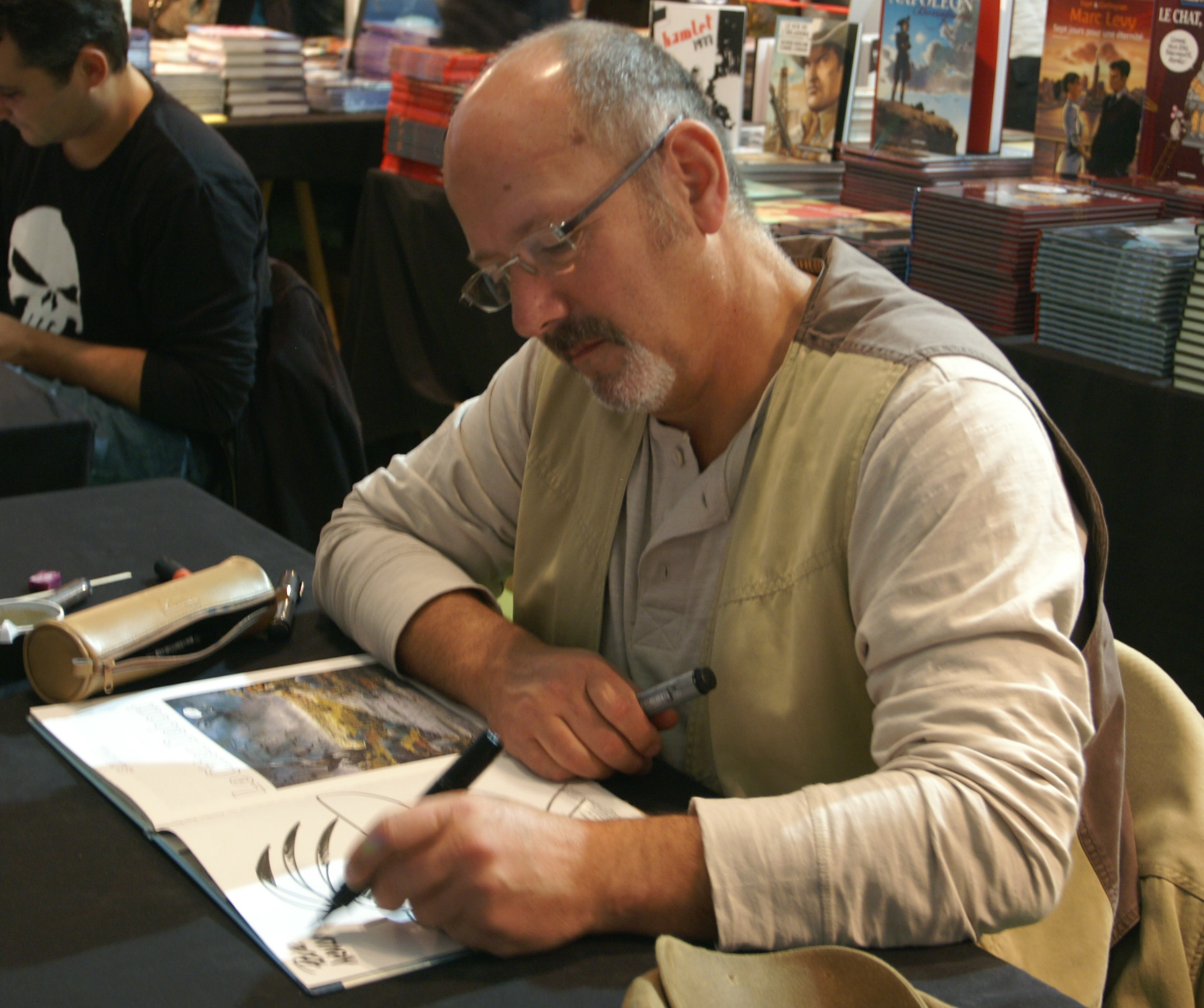
Amerzone is based on a 1986 comic by Benoît Sokal, pictured here autographing a comic at a convention in 2010.

=== Pre-production ===
Before entering the gaming industry, Benoît Sokal drew comic books like Canardo, which he colorized on a personal computer. (Note: Page 142) With the advent of CD-ROMs, which could store hundreds of times more data than then-ubiquitous floppy disks, Sokal was inspired in 1995 to create a multimedia CD-ROM containing 2D and 3D art which would add up to a cohesive universe. (Note: Page 137) His comic publisher, Casterman, approved of the idea, and after a successful demonstration Sokal began work on the project with software developer Gregory Duquesne. (Note: Pages 136–137) Casterman's initial vision was of a cheap, small-scale product with a very limited production run; they eventually realized that such a niche product would not sell, and decided to do something more ambitious.

Sokal and Duquesne began planning a full-fledged video game, which Sokal decided to base on his comic book L'Amerzone. It would be made up of prerendered screens, linked together using the Phoenix VR engine. Sokal held complete creative control over the product, doing all the design work himself. He believed that working alone would foster creativity, whereas collaboration would result in a banal and standard commercial product. (Note: Page 138) He did hire fellow comic book artist Benoît Peeters to assist with writing, but he soon left the project.

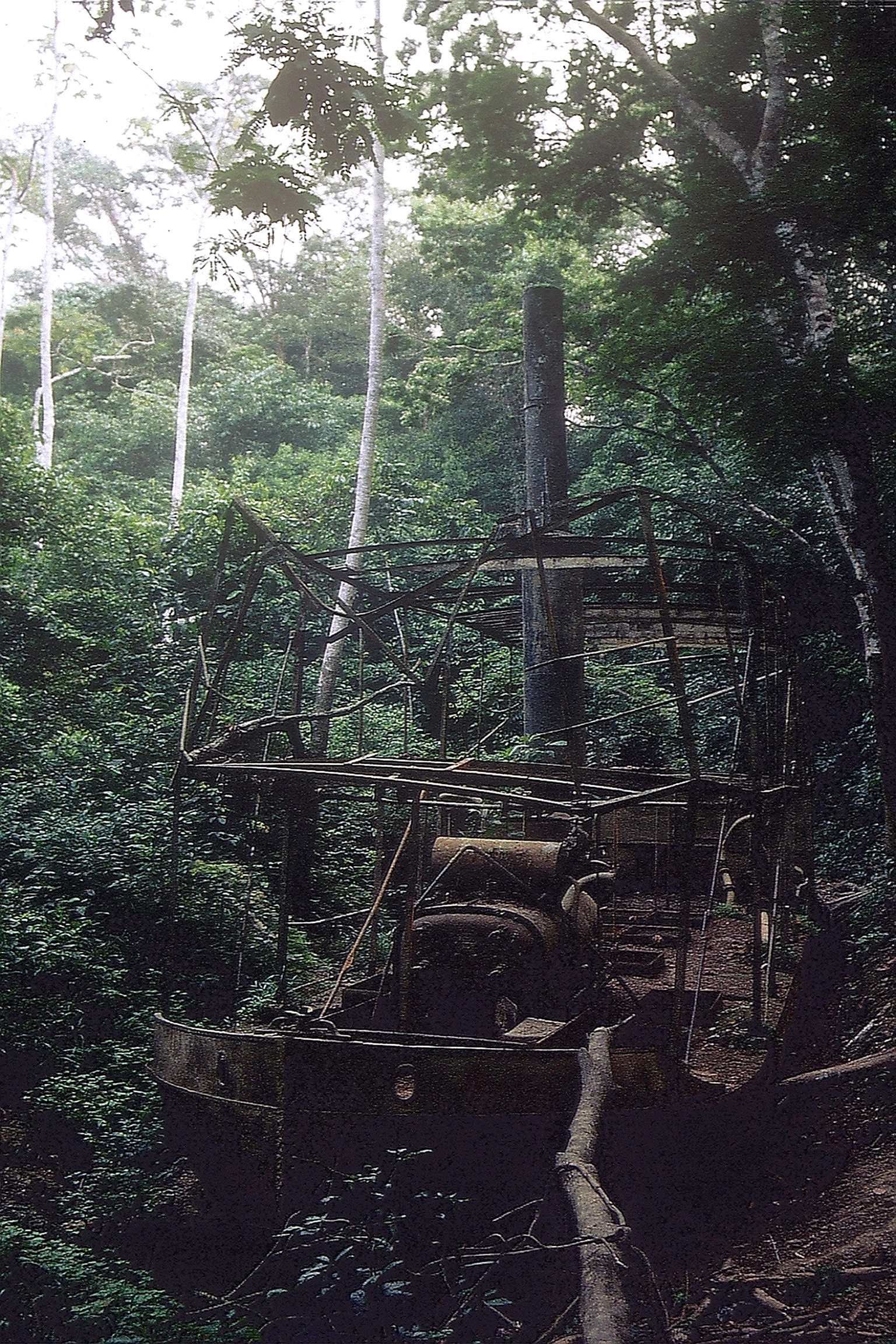
The game and particularly the Hydroflot and setting was inspired by the Werner Herzog film Fitzcarraldo (1982), about an ambitious rubber prospector and opera entrepreneur who portages a steamboat between two tributaries of the Amazon river; a prop boat left over from the film is pictured.

Sokal wanted to keep the game accessible to inexperienced players. This meant avoiding sudden difficulty spikes, which could leave a player stuck; point-of-no-return scenarios, in which a player is stuck because they missed an item; and failure states in which the player character is killed. (Note: Page 148) He admitted to thinking the game may have been too simple as a result, and promised that "if [they] were to make a sequel, I think it would be more complex, especially toward the end". (Note: Page 147)

Sokal wrote the game much as he typically wrote comics: first writing a linear story, then rendering it frame-by-frame as a storyboard. (Note: Pages 138–139) His guiding principle was to make "the kind of adventure that you no longer get these days, an adventure out of the early 20th century". (Note: Page 139) The challenge for Sokal was making this adventure interactive; in that regard, he found Duquesne's input very valuable. He credits Myst as his inspiration to make the game, and also cites Werner Herzog films like Fitzcarraldo and the writings of Gabriel García Márquez as influences. He is quoted especially as saying "Myst is really the game that made me want to make Amerzone". (Note: Page 140)

=== Production ===
The team began producing artwork in 1996, using LightWave 3D for character and object models, and Bryce 3D for environments. Modeling characters at Sokal's desired quality level was time-consuming, so the cast of characters was kept small. (Note: Page 146) Being unfamiliar with 3D graphics, Sokal had to learn on the fly by studying the software documentation and getting help from the more technically proficient Duquesne. The latter's skills were applied to the game's more complex visual effects, such as dust particles being buffeted about.

Sokal eventually realized the project was too ambitious for the two-man team, and hired Supinfocom graduates to help with the graphics from 1996 onwards. In 1998, Duquesne left to pursue a career at LightWave in the United States, and Sokal called on the Belgian company Grid Animation to produce cutscenes and do further graphics work. The experience made Sokal overcome his misgivings about working collaboratively. In an interview with JATV, he was quoted as saying: "I recall that [for] the first chapters of Amerzone, I modeled everything because I wanted to be on top, but it was impossible of course. So little by little, people made their way into the team and started modeling, and I told myself it made me sick but... in a way it was a revolution in my mind!" He ended up highly satisfied with the output of his collaborators.

Sokal recalls that the game's development was troubled at many points. In 1997, Casterman had fallen on hard times and called upon the publisher Microfolie's to help with financing. Microfolie themselves went bankrupt and the project was "saved" when Microïds bought them out and agreed to fund the game. The total budget was 5 million francs (€760,000), much higher than Sokal's initial sub-million-franc estimate. He would go on to describe the game's completion as a "miracle".

Amerzone underwent several changes in direction as some design ideas proved impractical or unappealing. Sokal originally wanted a strictly 2D art style, but was disappointed in the results. The team considered using live actors keyed into computer backgrounds instead of time-consuming 3D character modeling, but found the compositing of real and fake elements jarring. Concurrently, Duquesne and the publishers pushed for a highly interactive product, whereas Sokal had initially conceived of the game as a more passive experience. A day-to-night progression was scrapped, as was a requirement to feed and hydrate the journalist, since this would have created frustrating failure states.

=== Later development ===
Anuman interactive started work on iOS ports of the game in November 2010. The game was released on 7 June 2011.

Tetraedge Games—a developer of adventure games for mobile devices—was chosen to make the port, since they shared office space with Anuman and so could intercommunicate efficiently. Tetraedge cofounder Emmanuel Zaza said that the greatest hurdle lay in parsing all the old development data, which had not been organized properly. The port features greatly improved in-game visuals and cutscene video quality, and a new playable area: the top of the lighthouse. Benoît Sokal was eager to see the game rereleased for new players to enjoy, and collaborated with the Tetraedge team.

=== Release ===
Amerzone was released in France on 4 CD-ROMs for Windows on 19 March 1999. Mac OS and PlayStation ports followed in September and December of that year. December also saw the DVD-ROM rerelease of the game, in which the cutscenes were in MPEG2 format instead of Smacker video. The DVD-ROM version saw further rereleases, some of them by Mindscape, some of them as bargain-priced pack-ins with other adventure titles.

The official strategy guide, Amerzone: Strategies & Secrets was released in June 1999. In addition to a walkthrough of the game, it contains a guide to the Amerzone universe, an interview with Sokal and some behind-the-scenes information. Another book, Amerzone: Memoirs of an Expedition, was put out by Casterman in November of the same year. It compiles the art from the game and also some concept art that didn't make it into the final product. It is annotated with text explanations of the images, most of which are from the in-game expedition journal.

In January 2014, the Android port of the game was released. It is identical to the iOS release.

== Reception ==
=== Sales ===
Amerzone was a surprise commercial success; GameSpot UK noted in June 1999 that it had become a "big hit in France". Following its release in France in March 1999, it sold 10,000 units by early May, a number that French paper Libération considered a promising sign. The game proceeded to have a long shelf life. Its global sales surpassed 500,000 copies by March 2002. At the time, Mathieu Van Overstraeten of La Libre Belgique noted that these sales were unusual for Benoît Sokal's work, as each volume of Inspector Canardo averaged 30,000 units sold. In 2007, Michel Bams of Sokal's White Birds Productions reported that Amerzone had risen above 1 million sales. Ultimately, the game sold 1.5 million copies by 2013.

=== Critical reviews ===
Reception

Aggregate score
Aggregator	Score
GameRankings	73% (PC)

Review scores
Publication	Score
IGN	5.5/10
Adventure Gamers	4/5
JeuxVideo.com	18 / 20
Libération	Positive
Télérama	4/4

The game was generally positively received at the time. The presentation was ubiquitously praised: the visuals were called "magnificent" and "amazing", and frequently compared to those of Myst, although some complained of excessive pixelation. The cutscenes were praised for high video quality. The storyline and atmosphere were called "very good", "interesting and well-developed" and "sublime", with some critics drawing comparisons to Jules Verne novels. The linearity of the narrative drew criticism, however.

More divisive was the difficulty: some welcomed it for keeping players from getting stuck, while others complained that it made the game too simple and end too soon. There were also occasional complaints that the point-and-click interface was cumbersome or awkward. The sound design was the most criticized aspect of the game: the limited music was deemed repetitive and poor. A few reviewers were positive about the ambient sound effects.

The game also received some attention from mainstream publications such as Télérama and Libération, both giving extremely positive reviews.

=== Awards ===
Amerzone won the Pixel-INA prize for games at the 1999 Imagina festival in Monaco. Sokal attributes the game's commercial success to this accolade.

=== Legacy ===
The game has been cited as one of the finest examples of French computer adventure games. In 2003, Benoît Sokal would borrow the logo and name of his new company, White Bird Productions, from the game. Amerzone is occasionally referenced in his later games, most notably the Syberia series. Amerzone is collected with the first two Syberia installments as the Syberia Collection, which was released in October 2009.

A remake of the original game for PlayStation 5, Windows and Xbox Series X/S was released on 24 April 2025.
