= Syberia 3 =

2017 video game

- Developer: Microïds
- Publisher: Anuman
- Director: Benoît Sokal
- Producers: Romuald Le Trotter; Nouredine Mohammed Saad
- Designers: Lucas Lagravette; Pascal Mory
- Artists: Amaury Beyris; Maximilien Torti
- Writers: Benoît Sokal; Lucas Lagravette
- Composer: Inon Zur
- Series: Syberia
- Engine: Unity
- Platforms: macOS; PlayStation 4 Windows; Xbox One; Nintendo Switch
- Release: macOS, PlayStation 4, Windows, & Xbox One: EU: 21 April 2017; NA: 25 April 2017; Nintendo Switch: WW: 18 October 2018
- Genre: Graphic adventure
- Mode: Single-player

Syberia 3 is a graphic adventure video game developed by Microïds and published by Anuman for macOS, PlayStation 4, Windows, Xbox One, and Nintendo Switch. It is the third entry of the Syberia series and follows the adventures of American lawyer Kate Walker as she travels to various locations in the former Soviet Union.

== Plot ==
After abandoning the island of Syberia, Kate Walker finds herself adrift on a makeshift boat, rescued by the Youkol people. Determined to escape their common enemies, she decides to help the nomads fulfill their odd ancestral tradition, as they accompany their snow ostriches on their seasonal migration.

== Development and release ==
On 1 April 2009, Microïds announced that Syberia 3 was being developed and aimed to be released on PlayStation 3 and Windows in June 2010 as a real-time 3D game. The company had stated that the game would miss its original June 2010 release date because negotiations with Benoît Sokal were under way and Microïds was then acquired by Anuman. On 17 April 2010, another press release was issued, explaining that the Windows version will be released, but the PlayStation 3 version may not, due to problems with Sony. Microïds had also asked that fans of Syberia send them emails of support for the game. In an interview given in February 2011, Sokal revealed that work on the game had not started due to a lack of funding.

In November 2012, Microïds revealed that Sokal had officially signed a contract with Anuman to write the story of Syberia 3, the development had started and the game will be overseen by Elliot Grassiano, the original founder of Microïds. The game was scheduled for release in 2014-2015. On 21 August 2013, it was announced that the game had gone into production. The game's first screenshots were shown on 13 August 2014, and the stated release was given as of 2015 on Android, iOS, OS X, PlayStation 4, Windows, and Xbox One. The game was released in April 2017, dubbed in English, French, German, Polish, Spanish and Russian, with subtitles in Italian, Dutch, Czech, Korean and Chinese.

To promote Syberia 3, an augmented reality app titled Syberia AR - Meet Kate Walker was released as a complimentary download on the Apple Store in 2015. It was meant to be used for the 56th Venice Biennale at the Glasstress 2015 Gotika exhibition, which was jointly organized by the State Hermitage Museum and Berengo Studio. In November 2017, a DLC expansion was released entitled "An Automaton with a Plan", where the player assumes the role of the automaton Oscar.

== Reception ==
Reception

Aggregate score
| Aggregator | Score |
|---|---|
| Metacritic | (PC) 51/100 (PS4) 48/100 |

Review scores
| Publication | Score |
|---|---|
| Game Informer | 5/10 |
| GameSpot | 4/10 |
| PC Gamer (US) | 30/100 |

Syberia 3 received "mixed or average" reviews, according to video game review aggregator website Metacritic.

Elise Favis's scored the game 5/10 on Game Informer and said "The Syberia series is a product of its time, and Syberia 3 doesn't bring back any excitement. It is plagued by bugs, a disappointing storyline, cliché characters, and puzzles that are more frustrating than fun. This return fails to do the series justice, feeling more like an unpolished and dated adventure game instead of a revival."

GameSpot's Michael Highham scored the game 4/10 and concluded: "Slivers of enjoyment and potential are found within a disconnected and underwhelming journey. The characters, their interactions, the way they speak, and the reason they even exist all mash into a puzzle-adventure game devoid of significance or impact. The Syberia series deserved a better return, otherwise, it should've been left in the past."

PC Gamer's Fraser Brown scored the game 30/100, saying "Some solid puzzles can't rescue what is an otherwise terrible adventure game." Fraser criticized the game for its disconnected story, poor graphics and animation, subpar translation to English, awkward voice acting and unmitigated software bugs that severely damage the gaming experience.
