= 1892 in literature =

This article contains information about the literary events and publications of 1892.

== Events ==
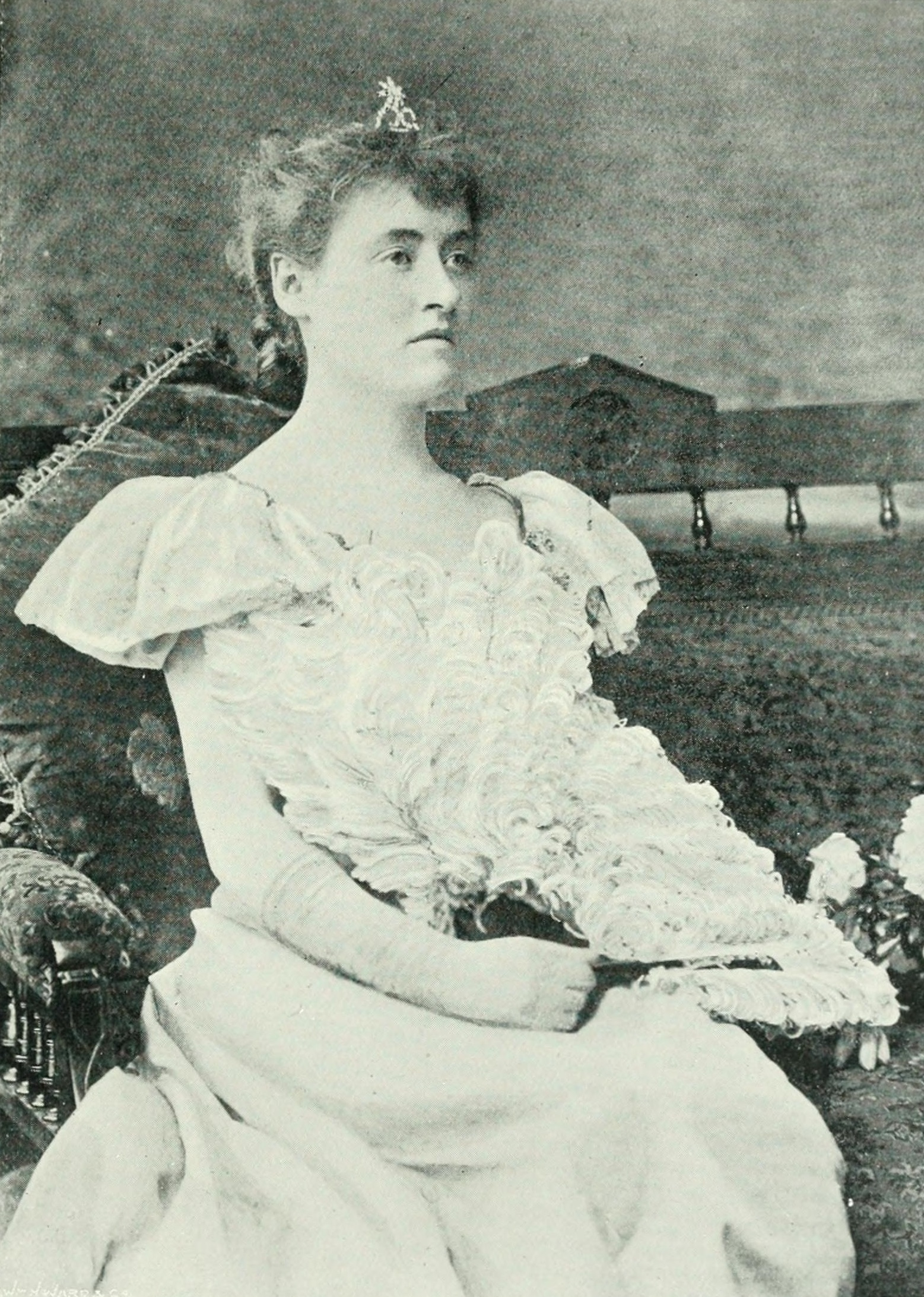
Winifred Emery as Lady Windermere in Lady Windermere's Fan, 1892

- January – The Schauspielhaus Zürich opens as the Volkstheater am Pfauen, a music hall.
- January 18 – Rudyard Kipling marries Caroline Starr Balestier.
- February 22 – Oscar Wilde's comedy Lady Windermere's Fan is premièred at St James's Theatre in London, starring Winifred Emery and Marion Terry.
- April 27 – The magazine Isis is established by students at the University of Oxford.
- June – Rehearsals for the première of Oscar Wilde's play Salome for inclusion in Sarah Bernhardt's London season (in French) are halted when the British Lord Chamberlain's licensor of plays prohibits it for including Biblical characters.
- July 15 – The Bibliographical Society is established in London.
- September 12 – The 11-year-old Virginia Stephen, the later novelist Virginia Woolf, takes a boat trip to Godrevy Lighthouse on a family holiday in Cornwall.
- October 14 – The first collection of Arthur Conan Doyle's Sherlock Holmes stories from The Strand Magazine (June 1891–June 1892), The Adventures of Sherlock Holmes, is published by George Newnes in London; it includes Doyle's favourite, "The Adventure of the Speckled Band", which was originally published in February.
- October 20 (O. S.: October 8) – Constantin Dobrescu-Argeș inaugurates Romania's first rural printing press, at Mușătești.
- November – The Sewanee Review is established by William Peterfield Trent; it will become the oldest continuously published literary quarterly in the United States.
- December 9 – George Bernard Shaw's first play Widowers' Houses has its first performance, at the Royalty Theatre in London under the auspices of the Independent Theatre Society. The author is booed.
- December 21 – Brandon Thomas' farce Charley's Aunt begins a record-breaking London run at the Royalty Theatre (following a pre-London opening at Bury St Edmunds on February 29).
- The Irish Literary Society is founded by W. B. Yeats, T. W. Rolleston and Charles Gavan Duffy in London, and the National Literary Society by Yeats in Dublin with scholar Douglas Hyde as its first president.
- unknown dates
  - Carlo Collodi's The Adventures of Pinocchio is translated into English for the first time, by Mary Alice Murray.
  - Shadows Uplifted by Frances Ellen Watkins Harper becomes the second novel by an African-American woman published in the United States.

== New books ==
=== Fiction ===
- C. R. Ashbee – From Whitechapel to Camelot
- Mary Elizabeth Braddon – The Venetians
- Rhoda Broughton – Mrs. Bligh
- Anton Chekhov – "Ward No. 6"
- Gabriele D'Annunzio – L'innocente
- Arthur Conan Doyle – The Adventures of Sherlock Holmes (book publication)
- Theodor Fontane – Frau Jenny Treibel
- Ludwig Ganghofer - The Monastery's Hunter (Der Klosterjäger)
- Hamlin Garland
  - Jason Edwards: An Average Man
  - A Member of the Third House
- Charlotte Perkins Gilman (as Charlotte Perkins Stetson) – The Yellow Wallpaper (in The New England Magazine, January)
- George Gissing – Born in Exile
- George and Weedon Grossmith – The Diary of a Nobody (book publication)
- Knut Hamsun – Mysteries
- Thomas Hardy – The Well-Beloved (serialization)
- Frances Ellen Watkins Harper – Shadows Uplifted
- Herman Heijermans – Trinette
- Ichiyō Higuchi – short stories: "Yamizakura" (闇桜, Flowers at Dusk), "Wakarejimo" (別れ霜), "Tamadasuki" (玉襷), "Samidare" (五月雨), "Kyōzukue" (経づくえ), "Umoregi" (うもれ木)
- Emily Lawless – Grania: The Story of an Island
- J. McCullough – Golf in the Year 2000
- William Hurrell Mallock – A Human Document
- Helen Mathers, Arthur Conan Doyle, Bram Stoker and 21 others – The Fate of Fenella
- Karl May – Durch Wüste und Harem
- Robert Louis Stevenson and Lloyd Osbourne – The Wrecker
- Mark Twain – The American Claimant
- Jules Verne – Mistress Branican and "The Carpathian Castle"
- Robert Potter — The Germ Growers
- Mary Augusta Ward – The History of David Grieve
- Mary Eleanor Wilkins Freeman
  - Young Lucretia and Other Stories
  - The Pot of Gold and Other Stories
- Owen Wister - The Dragon of Wantley: His Tale
- Israel Zangwill
  - The Big Bow Mystery (book publication)
  - Children of the Ghetto
- Émile Zola – La Débâcle

=== Children and young people ===
- H. Irving Hancock – His One Ambition; or, The Boy Reporter

=== Drama ===
- R. C. Carton – Liberty Hall
- José Echegaray – Mariana
- Georges Feydeau – Champignol malgré lui
- Jacob Mikhailovich Gordin
  - Der Pogrom in Rusland (The Pogrom in Russia)
  - Tsvey veltn, oder Der groyser sotsialist (Two Worlds, or The Great Socialist)
  - Der yidisher kenig lir (The Yiddish King Lear)
- Gerhart Hauptmann – The Weavers (Die Weber)
- Mykhailo Starytsky – Oi Ne Khody, Hrytsiu
- Arthur Symons – The Minister's Call
- Brandon Thomas – Charley's Aunt
- Oscar Wilde – Lady Windermere's Fan

=== Poetry ===
- Rudyard Kipling – Barrack-Room Ballads (including "Gunga Din")
- W. B. Yeats – The Countess Kathleen and Various Legends and Lyrics

=== Non-fiction ===
- Anna J. Cooper – A Voice from the South: By a Black Woman of the South
- Naimuddin – Fatawa 'Alamgiri (Bengali translation)
- Peter Kropotkin – The Conquest of Bread (La Conquête du pain)
- Papus – La Kabbale
- Francis Parkman - A Half Century of Conflict (Final published volume of France and England in North America)
- Ferdinand Praeger (died 1891) – Wagner As I Knew Him
- Constantin Sion – Arhondologia Moldovei (Moldavia's Peerage; posthumous)
- Rudolph Sohm – Kirchenrecht
- Joseph Wright – A Grammar of the Dialect of Windhill in the West Riding of Yorkshire
- Ella Hepworth Dixon (as Margaret Wynman) – My Flirtations (biographical sketches)

== Births ==
- January 3 – J. R. R. Tolkien, South African-born English novelist and scholar (died 1973)
- January 13 – N. Porsenna, Romanian novelist, essayist, poet and social psychologist (died 1971)
- February 8 – Ralph Chubb, English poet, printer and artist (died 1960)
- February 22 – Edna St. Vincent Millay, American poet (died 1950)
- February 23 – Agnes Smedley, American journalist and writer (died 1950)
- March 1 – Ryūnosuke Akutagawa, Japanese short story writer and poet (suicide 1927)
- March 8 – Juana de Ibarbourou, Uruguayan poet (died 1979)
- March 9
  - David Garnett, English novelist (died 1981)
  - Vita Sackville-West, English poet, novelist and gardener (died 1962)
- March 18 – Robert P. T. Coffin, American poet, essayist, novelist and academic (died 1955)
- March 22 – Karel Poláček, Czech writer, humorist and journalist (died 1944)
- May 9 – Ștefan Foriș, Hungarian and Romanian journalist and communist activist (murdered 1946)
- May 18 – Cecil Roberts, English novelist, journalist and poet (died 1976)
- May 26 – Maxwell Bodenheim, American poet and novelist (murdered 1954)
- May 29 – Max Brand, born Frederick Schiller Faust, American Western, pulp fiction and screenwriter (died 1944)
- June 11 – Irene Rathbone, English novelist (died 1980)
- June 12 – Djuna Barnes, American writer (died 1982)
- June 26 – Pearl S. Buck, born Pearl Sydenstricker, American novelist, recipient of the Nobel Prize in Literature (died 1973)
- July 1 – James M. Cain, American author and journalist (died 1977)
- July 12 – Bruno Schulz, Polish writer and artist (killed 1942)
- August 5 – Margery Fish, English gardening writer (died 1969)
- October 8 (September 26 O.S.) – Marina Tsvetaeva, Russian poet (suicide 1941)
- October 9 – Ivo Andrić, Serbo-Croatian novelist, recipient of the Nobel Prize in Literature (died 1975)
- October 14 (probable date) – Saira Elizabeth Luiza Shah, Scottish writer (died 1960)
- October 27 – Victor E. van Vriesland, Dutch writer (died 1974)
- December 6 – Osbert Sitwell, English novelist and poet (died 1969)
- December 10 – Lucy M. Boston, born Lucy Maria Wood, English children's novelist (died 1990)
- December 12 – Mykola Kulish, Ukrainian prose writer, playwright (shot with many other Ukrainian intellectuals at Sandarmokh 1937)
- December 21
  - Amy Clarke, English mystical poet, author and academic (died 1980)
  - Rebecca West, born Cicily Fairfield, English writer (died 1983)
- unknown dates
  - Gheorghe A. Lăzăreanu-Lăzurică, Romanian Romani writer and activist (year of death unknown)
  - Sheila Stuart (born Gladys May Baker), Scottish author and children's writer (died 1974)

== Deaths ==
- January 20 – Christopher Pearse Cranch, American poet and magazine editor (born 1813)
- January 28 – Gustav Zerffi, Hungarian journalist and rationalist (born 1820)
- March 16 – Edward Augustus Freeman, English historian and politician (born 1823)
- March 26 – Walt Whitman, American poet (born 1819)
- March 28 – Emily Lucas Blackall, American author (born 1832)
- April 15 – Amelia Edwards, English fiction writer and Egyptologist (born 1831)
- April 21 – Emelie Tracy Y. Swett, American author (b. 1863)
- July 10 – Rudolf Westphal, German classical scholar (born 1826)
- July 15 – Thomas Cooper, English Chartist poet (born 1805)
- July 18 – Rose Terry Cooke, American poet and novelist (born 1827)
- August 25 – Richard Lewis Nettleship, English philosopher (born 1846)
- September 6 – B. Beaumont, British author (born 1828)
- September 7 – John Greenleaf Whittier, American Quaker poet (born 1807)
- September 11 – Clarissa Caldwell Lathrop, American social reformer and autobiographer (born 1847)
- September 17 – Ignaz Vincenz Zingerle, Austrian poet (born 1825)
- September 23 – George Grub, Scottish church historian (born 1812)
- October 2 – Teréz Karacs, Hungarian novelist, poet and memoirist (born 1808)
- October 12 – Xavier Marmier, French writer and translator (born 1808)
- October 17 – David Edelstadt, Russian-born American poet in Yiddish (born 1866)
- October 21 – Anne Charlotte Leffler, Swedish novelist and dramatist (born 1849)
- October 24 – Anton Gindely, Bohemian historian (born 1829)
- December 1 – Mary Allen West, American superintendent of schools, newspaper editor (born 1837)
- December 3 (November 21 O.S.) – Afanasy Fet, Russian lyric poet, essayist and short-story writer (born 1820)
- December 27 – Orange Judd, American editor and publisher (born 1822)
