= Timeline of the history of the United States (1860–1899) =

This section of the timeline of United States history concerns events from 1860 to 1899.

== 1860s ==
=== Presidency of James Buchanan ===
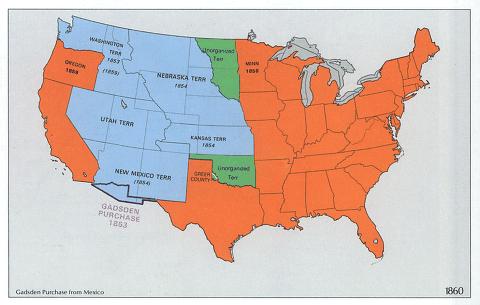
U.S. territorial extent in 1860

- April 3, 1860 – Pony Express begins from St. Joseph, Missouri to Sacramento, California.
- November 6 – 1860 United States presidential election: Abraham Lincoln elected president and Hannibal Hamlin vice president with only 39% of the vote in a four-man race.
- December 18 – Crittenden Compromise fails.
- December 20 – President Buchanan fires his cabinet.
- December 20 – South Carolina secedes from the Union
- January 9, 1861 – Secessionist forces in South Carolina fire at the USS Star of the West, forcing it to withdraw.
- January 9 – Mississippi secedes from the Union
- January 10 – Florida secedes from the Union
- January 11 – Alabama secedes from the Union
- January 19 – Georgia secedes from the Union
- January 26 – Louisiana secedes from the Union
- February 1 – Texas secedes from the Union
- February 4 – Secessionist states establish the Confederate States of America
- February 9 – Jefferson Davis elected provisional president of the Confederacy. Alexander H. Stephens elected provisional vice president of the Confederacy.
- February 11 – Stephens becomes provisional vice president of the Confederate States.
- February 18 – Davis becomes provisional president of the Confederate States.
- March 2 – The Corwin Amendment to enshrine slavery forever is passed by Congress. It is not ratified.

=== Presidency of Abraham Lincoln ===
- March 4, 1861 – Lincoln becomes the 16th president and Hamlin becomes the 15th vice president
- 1861 – American Civil War begins at Fort Sumter
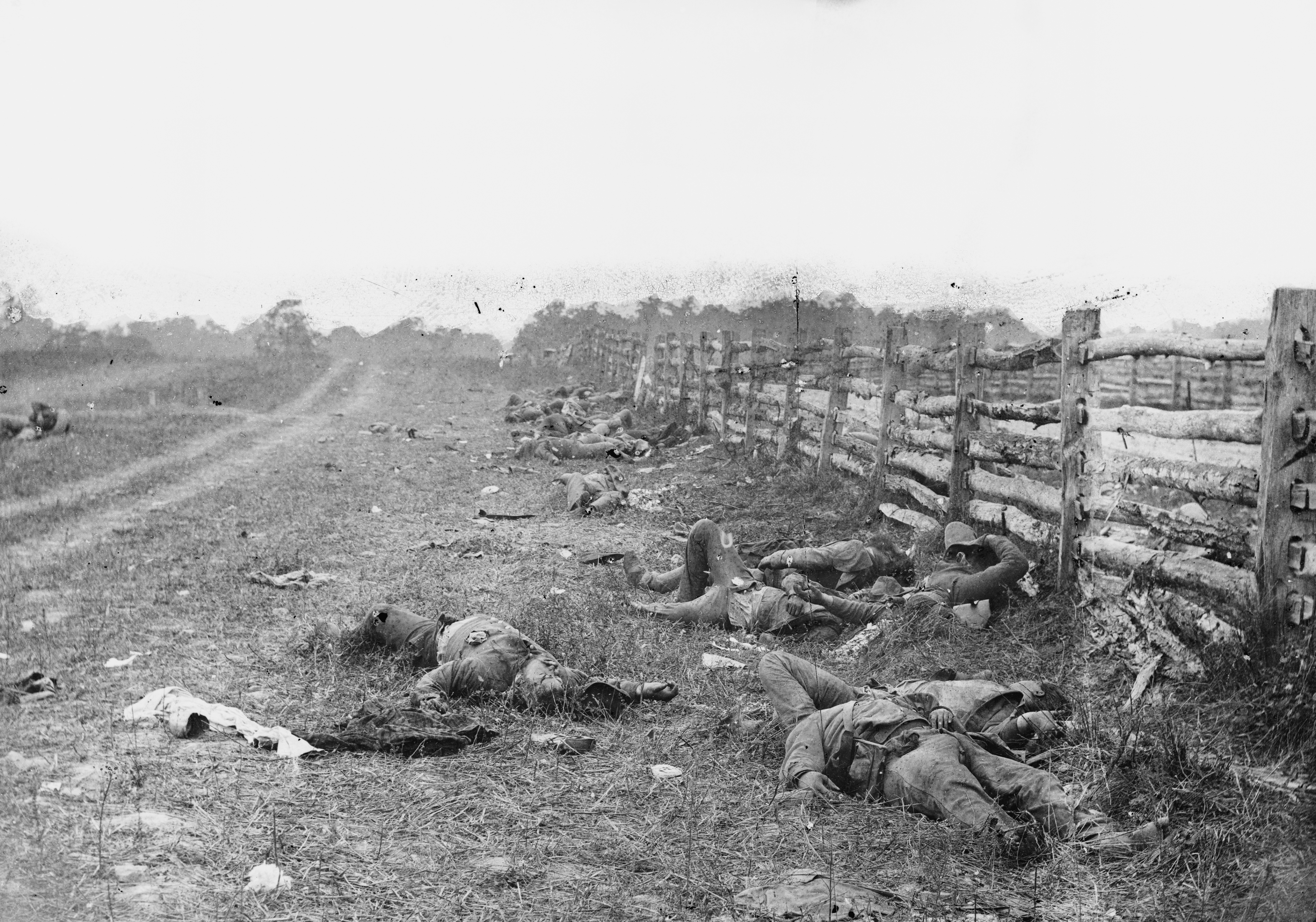
  More than 550,000 Americans died fighting the Civil War, including these men who fell during the bloody Battle of Antietam.
- 1861 – First Battle of Bull Run (First Battle of Manassas)
- 1861 – Davis unanimously elected to full term as Confederate president, Stephen unanimously elected to full term as Confederate vice president.
- February 22, 1862 – Davis becomes Confederate president, Stephens become Confederate vice president.
- 1862 – Battle of Hampton Roads (Battle of the Monitor and Merrimack; first ever naval battle between iron-sided ships)
- 1862 – Homestead Act
- 1862 – Morrill Land-Grant Colleges Act
- 1862 – Gen. Robert E. Lee placed in command of the Army of Northern Virginia
- 1862 – Second Battle of Bull Run (Second Battle of Manassas)
- 1862 – Battle of Antietam (Battle of Sharpsburg)
- 1862 – Dakota War of 1862 begins
- 1862–1863 – Lincoln issues Emancipation Proclamation
- 1863 – Battle of Gettysburg
- 1863 – The Siege of Vicksburg ends
- 1863 – New York City draft riots
- 1863 – Pro-Union Virginia counties become separate state of West Virginia
- 1863 - Lincoln announces the 10% Plan
- 1864 – Gen. Ulysses S. Grant put in command of all Union forces
- 1864 – Wade–Davis Bill
- 1864 – Sand Creek massacre
- 1864 – Nevada becomes a state
- 1864 – 1864 United States presidential election; Abraham Lincoln is reelected president and Andrew Johnson elected vice president on the "fusion" National Union Party ticket.
- 1864 – Sherman's March to the Sea
- 1865 – Robert E. Lee made commander-in-chief of all Confederate forces
- March 4, 1865 – President Lincoln begins second term; Johnson becomes the 16th vice president
- 1865 – Richmond, Virginia, the Confederate capital, captured by a corps of black Union troops
- 1865 – Lee surrenders to Grant at Appomattox Court House
- 1865 – Freedmen's Bureau

=== Presidency of Andrew Johnson ===
- April 15, 1865 – President Lincoln assassinated; Vice President Johnson becomes the 17th president
- April–June 1865 – American Civil War ends as the last elements of the Confederacy surrender
- 1865 – Ku Klux Klan founded
- 1865 – Slavery abolished by the Thirteenth Amendment.
- 1866 – Civil Rights Act of 1866
- 1866 - Tennessee becomes the first Confederate state readmitted to the union
- 1867 – Tenure of Office Act enacted
- 1867 – Territory of Alaska purchased from the Russian Empire
- 1867 - The US Annexes the Midway Islands in the Pacific
- 1867 – Nebraska becomes a state
- 1867 - Congress passes a series of Reconstruction acts and the period of Radical Reconstruction begins
- 1868 – Impeachment of Andrew Johnson, acquitted by the Senate by one vote.
- 1868 – Fourteenth Amendment is ratified; second of Reconstruction Amendments.
- 1868 – The Copperheads are dissolved.
- 1868 – 1868 United States presidential election; Ulysses S. Grant is elected president and Schuyler Colfax is elected vice president.
- 1868 - Arkansas, Louisiana, Florida, North Carolina, South Carolina, and Alabama are admitted back into the union.
- 1868 - Boss Tweed gained control of Tammany Hall.

=== Presidency of Ulysses S. Grant ===
- March 4, 1869 – Grant becomes the 18th president and Colfax becomes the 17th vice president.
- 1869 – The First transcontinental railroad is completed at Promontory Summit, Utah Territory.
- 1869 – Texas v. White upholds Radical Reconstruction and states that once Texas joins the Union, its union was indissoluble.
- 1869 - A plan to annex the Caribbean nation of Santo Domingo is proposed, though it eventually failed in the Senate.

== 1870s ==
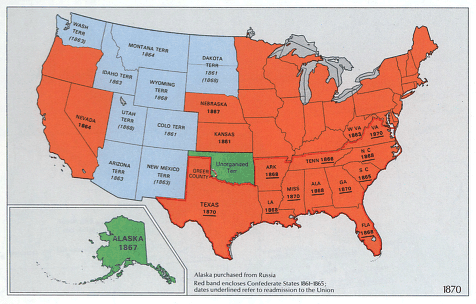
U.S. territorial extent in 1870

- 1870 – 15th Amendment
- 1870 – First graduate programs (at Yale and Harvard)
- 1870 – Black Codes
- 1870 - Virginia, Mississippi, Texas, and Georgia are readmitted to the union
- 1871 – Great Chicago Fire
- 1871 – Treaty of Washington with the British Empire regarding Canada
- 1871 - The New York Times published evidence of Tweed's rampant greed.
- 1871 - Civil Service Reform Act passes
- 1871 - Ku Klux Klan Act
- 1872 – Yellowstone National Park created
- 1872 – Crédit Mobilier scandal
- 1872 – Amnesty Act
- 1872 – Alabama Claims
- 1872 – 1872 United States presidential election: Ulysses S. Grant reelected president; Henry Wilson elected vice president
- 1872 - Victoria Claflin Woodhull, first woman presidential candidate, enters presidential race.
- 1873 – Panic of 1873
- March 4, 1873 – President Grant begins second term; Wilson becomes the 18th vice president
- 1873 – Virginius Affair
- 1873 - One of the first schools of nursing opens at Bellevue Hospital in New York
- 1874 – Red River Indian War
- 1874 - National Woman's Christian Temperance Union formed in Cleveland
- 1875 – Aristides (horse) wins first Kentucky Derby
- 1875 – Resumption Act
- 1875 – Civil Rights Act of 1875
- 1875 – The Art Students League of New York is founded
- November 22, 1875 – Vice President Wilson dies in office
- 1875 - Whiskey Ring Scandal
- 1876 – National League of baseball founded
- 1876 – Centennial Exposition in Philadelphia
- 1876 – Munn v. Illinois establishes public regulation of utilities
- 1876 – Colorado becomes a state
- 1876 – Battle of Little Bighorn
- 1876 - Central Park opens in New York City
- 1876 – Wild Bill Hickok is killed by a shot to the back of his head by Jack McCall while playing poker in Deadwood, South Dakota. He held aces and eights, now known as the Dead man's hand.
- 1876 – 1876 United States presidential election seemingly elects Samuel J. Tilden president and Thomas A. Hendricks vice president, but results are disputed with 20 Electoral College votes allegedly in doubt.
- 1877 – The Electoral Commission awards Rutherford B. Hayes the presidency and William A. Wheeler the vice presidency in return for ending the military occupation of the South.
- 1877 – Great Railroad Strike of 1877

=== Presidency of Rutherford B. Hayes ===
- March 4, 1877 – After only two days as president-elect and vice president-elect, Hayes becomes the 19th president and Wheeler becomes the 19th vice president
- 1877 – Reconstruction ends
- 1877 – Nez Perce War
- 1878 – Bland–Allison Act
- 1878 – Morgan silver dollars first minted
- 1879 – Thomas Edison creates first commercially viable light bulb
- 1879 – Knights of Labor go public

== 1880s ==
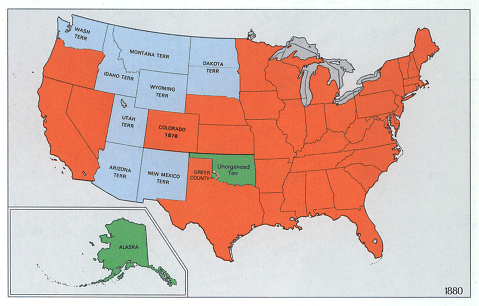
U.S. territorial extent in 1880

- 1880 – University of Southern California founded
- 1880 – U.S. population exceeds 50 million
- 1880 – 1880 United States presidential election: James A. Garfield elected president and Chester A. Arthur vice president. Their popular margin is less than 2,000 votes.

=== Presidency of James A. Garfield ===
- March 4, 1881 – Garfield becomes the 20th president; Arthur becomes the 20th vice president.
- July 2, 1881 – President Garfield is shot by a deranged gunman on a train platform.

=== Presidency of Chester A. Arthur ===
- September 19, 1881 – President Garfield dies, Vice President Arthur becomes the 21st president
- 1881 – The Gunfight at the O.K. Corral in Tombstone, Arizona Territory
- 1881 – Clara Barton creates the American Red Cross
- 1881 – Tuskegee Institute founded
- 1881 – Billy the Kid is shot and killed by Sheriff Pat Garrett near Fort Sumner
- 1881 – A Century of Dishonor written by Helen Hunt Jackson
- 1882 – Chinese Exclusion Act
- 1882 – Jesse James was shot and killed by Robert and Charlie Ford
- 1883 - The Southern section of the second transcontinental railroad line is completed.
- 1883 – Buffalo Bill's Wild West show founded. participants include: Sitting Bull, Geronimo, Calamity Jane, and Annie Oakley.
- 1883 – Civil Rights Cases 109 US 3 1883 legalizes doctrine of segregation
- 1883 – Pendleton Civil Service Reform Act
- 1883 – Brooklyn Bridge opens
- 1883 - Joseph Pulitzer buys the New York World
- 1884 – 1884 United States presidential election: Grover Cleveland elected president and Thomas A. Hendricks elected vice president
- 1884 – Washington Monument completed

=== First presidency of Grover Cleveland ===
- March 4, 1885 – Cleveland becomes the 22nd president; Hendricks becomes the 21st vice president
- November 25, 1885 – Vice President Hendricks dies
- 1886 – Haymarket Square Riot
- 1886 – American Federation of Labor founded in Columbus, Ohio
- 1886 – Statue of Liberty (Liberty Enlightening the World) dedicated
- 1887 – The United States Congress creates Interstate Commerce Commission
- 1887 – Dawes Act
- 1887 – Hatch Act
- 1888 – Publication of Looking Backward by Edward Bellamy
- 1888 – National Geographic Society founded
- 1888 – 1888 United States presidential election: Benjamin Harrison elected president and Levi P. Morton vice president despite coming in second in the popular vote.

=== Presidency of Benjamin Harrison ===
- March 4, 1889 – Harrison becomes the 23rd president and Morton becomes the 22nd vice president
- 1889 – Oklahoma Land Rush (April 22, 1889)
- 1889 – Centennial of the Constitution celebrated.
- 1889 – North Dakota, South Dakota, Montana and Washington become states
- 1889 – Johnstown Flood in Pennsylvania
- 1889 – Jane Addams founds Hull House
- December 6, 1889 – Former Confederate president Jefferson Davis dies.
- 1889 - During a speech given by Benjamin Harrison, he becomes the first U.S. president in history to have a voice recording.

== 1890s ==
- 1890 – Sherman Antitrust Act
- 1890 – Jacob Riis published "How the Other Half Lives"
- 1890 – Sherman Silver Purchase Act
- 1890 – McKinley Tariff
- 1890 – Yosemite National Park created
- 1890 – Idaho and Wyoming become states
- 1890 – Wounded Knee Massacre
- 1890 – National American Woman Suffrage Association founded
- 1890 - Reporter Nelly Bly circles globe by train and steamship in 72 days
- 1891 – Baltimore crisis
- 1891 – James Naismith invents basketball
- 1891 - Hamlin Garland publishes Main-Travelled Roads
- 1892 – Homestead Strike
- 1892 – General Electric Company founded
- 1892 – Sierra Club founded by John Muir
- 1892 - Populist national convention held in Omaha
- 1892 – 1892 United States presidential election: Grover Cleveland elected president and Adlai E. Stevenson, vice president

=== Second presidency of Grover Cleveland ===
- March 4, 1893 – Cleveland becomes the 24th president; Stevenson becomes the 23rd vice president
- 1893 – Panic of 1893
- 1893 – Sherman Silver Purchase Act repealed
- 1893 - Columbian Exposition opens in Chicago
- 1894 – Coxey's Army
- 1894 – Pullman Strike
- 1894 – Wilson–Gorman Tariff Act, including income tax
- 1894 – Sunset Limited service opened on the second transcontinental route by Southern Pacific Railroad
- 1895 – Lee Shelton shoots Billy Lyons, spawning countless ballads.
- 1895 – Pollock v. Farmers' Loan & Trust Co. strikes down part of Wilson-Gorman Tariff
- 1895 - William Randolph Hearst purchases the New York Morning Journal
- 1896 – Plessy v. Ferguson 163 US 537 1896 affirms the idea of "separate but equal"
- 1896 – William Jennings Bryan delivers his Cross of Gold speech
- 1896 – Gold discovered in the Yukon's Klondike
- 1896 – Utah becomes a state
- 1896 - Henry Ford builds his first automobile
- 1896 – 1896 United States presidential election: William McKinley elected president and Garret A. Hobart vice president

=== Presidency of William McKinley ===
- March 4, 1897 – McKinley becomes the 25th president; and Hobart becomes the 24th vice president

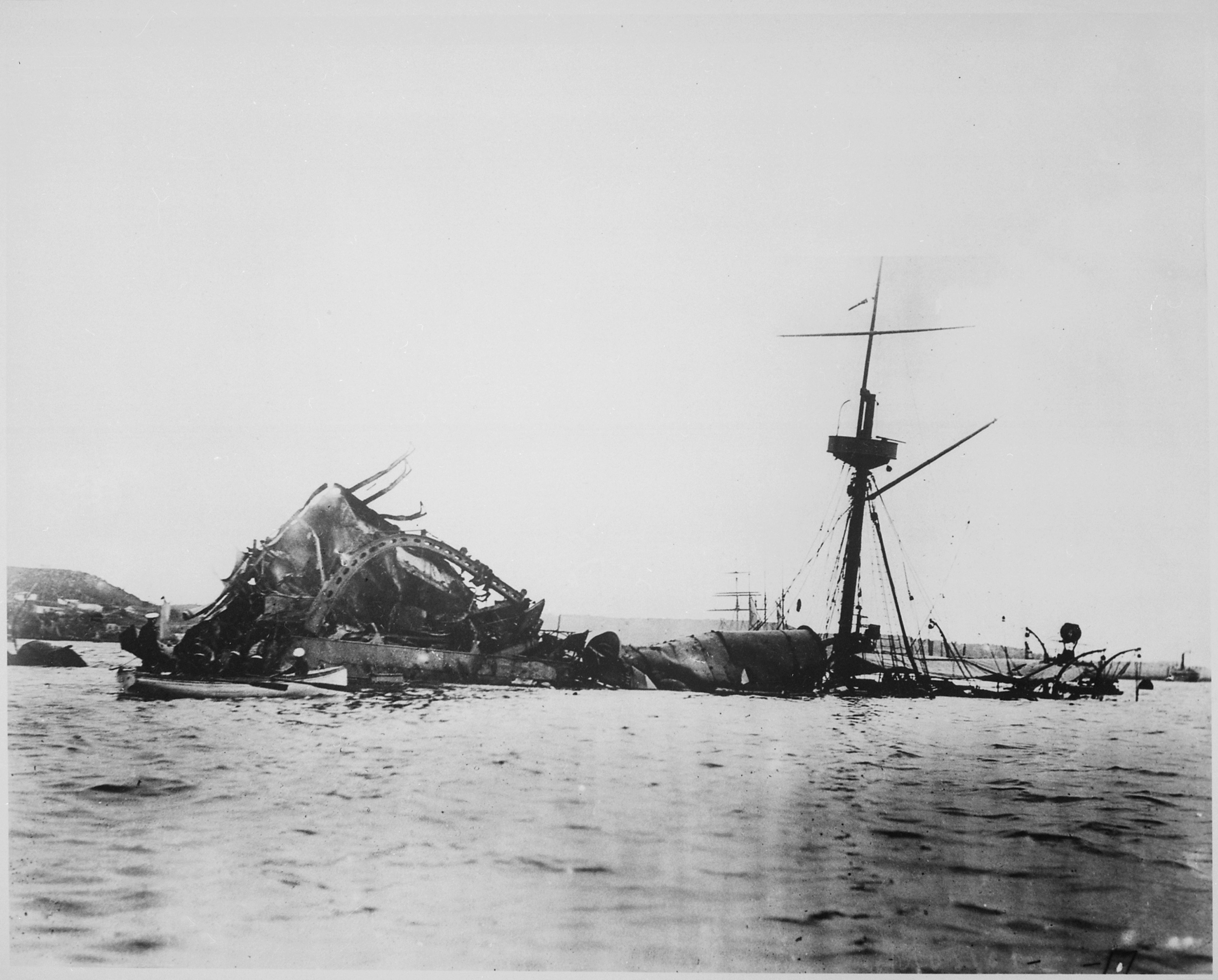
Wreckage of the USS Maine

- 1897 – Boston subway completed
- 1897 – Dingley tariff
- 1898 – The City of Greater New York is created through the annexation of Brooklyn, Western Queens County, and Staten Island into New York City
- 1898 – USS Maine explodes in Havana, Cuba harbor, precipitating the Spanish–American War
- 1898 – De Lôme Letter
- 1898 – Treaty of Paris (1898) ends Spanish–American War; Philippine–American War begins
- 1898 – Hawaii annexed
- 1898 – Newlands Resolution
- 1898 – American Anti-Imperialist League organized
- 1899 – Teller Amendment
- 1899 – Newsboys' strike of 1899
- 1899 – American Samoa occupied
- 1899 – Open Door Notes; Boxer Rebellion begins
- November 21, 1899 – Vice President Garret Hobart dies

== See also ==
- Timeline of the American Old West
- History of the United States (1849–1865)
- History of the United States (1865–1917)
