= Crumbling Idols =

Essay collection by Hamlin Garland

Crumbling Idols is a collection of 12 essays written and completed by Hamlin Garland in 1894. Garland was one of the most prominent American authors of the early 20th century, and contributed heavily to the literary movement known as American Realism. His work, Crumbling Idols, expresses his views and manifesto as a veritist (realist) artist. In it, he repeatedly emphasizes the importance of a uniquely American literature, one that breaks away from tradition and the past and focuses on the present in order to depict reality through the artists own eyes.

Crumbling Idols was decreed a controversial work by the general population and critics during the time of its publication as it attacked many of the features and ideas of nineteenth century literature. Three of his essays, "Provincialism", "Literary Centres", and "Literary Masters", were especially controversial and criticized as they heavily attacked the "imitated" literature of the east coast as well as the lack of innovation in American literature as a whole. Most of his other essays worked to promote realist ideals and values, such as local color and distinction and originality in art. Crumbling Idols was especially supported by fellow Realist authors, such as William Dean Howells and Stephen Crane.

== Essays ==
1. Provincialism
2. New Fields
3. The Question of Success
4. Literary Prophecy
5. Local Color in Art
6. The Local Novel
7. The Drift of the Drama
8. The Influence of Ibsen
9. Impressionism
10. Literary Centres
11. Literary Masters
12. A recapitulatory After-Word

== Themes ==
=== Provincialism ===
Garland defines provincialism as the “dependence upon a mother country for models of art production.” Garland criticizes American writers of the early-mid 19th century for imitating the artistic styles of other nations, and called for a new and purely American art, especially in literature. He especially goes after the mid-western states, schools, and the middle class for refusing to accept new and evolving art forms. Garland says of the mid-western states, of where he was born, “Its literary clubs valiantly discuss dead issues in English literature, and vote in majority against the indigenous.” It disappoints him that the mid-west continues to settle for old, romantic literature rather than producing and supporting new forms of a distinctly mid-western art. Garland places much of the blame on American schools he charges with indoctrinating pupils in worshipping the past while turning a blind eye to new and upcoming literary movements. If students are to study authors such as Whitman, Howells, and Ibsen, they must do it on their own. The most provincial of us all, Garland asserts, is the middle class, as they are the product of the schools that teach conservatism in literature.

Garland was a strong opponent of American provincialism and worked hard to advocate a strong, national literature that would be completely independent from other nations. The style doesn’t necessarily needed to be better, just different. He assured readers, however, that there was hope. The fact that people studied the past through such writers as Shakespeare is better than not engaging in literature at all. It was, as Garland says a, “sign of life, and not of death.”

=== Local color ===
Garland believed that artists should present art that represents their own surroundings, local and distinct. He believed it to be very important for artists to express truth in their art by presenting people, cultures and lands that they are most familiar with. It’s the differences between separate lands that create interest, uniqueness, and truth in literature. Garland’s definition of local color is as follows:

“Local color in a novel means that it has such quality of texture and back-ground that it could not have been written in any other place or by any one else than a native.”

This was the way, in Garland’s view, to redeem American literature. By creating art for the present, the artist automatically breaks from the past and so art can evolve and not be confined to the box of tradition and the past.

=== Evolution ===
The central theme of Crumbling Idols is the need for progress and evolution in literature. It’s inconsistent with veritism/realism for an artist to imitate the literature of the past as it prevents that artist from conveying the art that is around him or her. While it is good to read such authors as Shakespeare, Ibsen, Dante, etc., it is important to acknowledge that they do not represent the present or future. Garland goes so far as to make the argument that if such authors were alive today they would themselves be advocating and expressing new forms of art. It is crucial that artists break away from tradition, and not let revered writers of the past hinder change, for they are crumbling idols.

== Critical reception ==
By the early-mid-1890s, Garland became a well-known author after publishing such works as Main-Travelled Roads. He soon began feeling pressure from different publishers into publishing his volume of essays, which of course would later be known as Crumbling Idols. According to Keith Newlin's biography, Hamlin Garland, Garland would eventually agree under the conditions that the publishing company Stone and Kimball guarantee a profit of 15% on the first edition. Garland also wanted to promote the Chicago-based company, as he of course felt it important for different regions to develop their own individual art.

Garland fully intended to make Crumbling Idols very controversial, in order to increase sales. The work continuously goes after the literature of the east coast and seems to attack the works of revered, past authors and artists. The critics of Garland's work were just as harsh. Many critics demeaned Garland's writing abilities and claimed his ideas were ridiculous, as he seems to state that simply writing of local color would produce works far greater than those of the established greats of the east coast. Despite William Dean Howells' encouraging words and support of Garland's essays, Garland became increasingly offended by his critics and eventually ceased to acknowledge and listen to the reviews.
