= Palmer Brothers Octagons =

Historic houses in Wisconsin, United States

- Palmer Brother's Octagons
- U.S. National Register of Historic Places
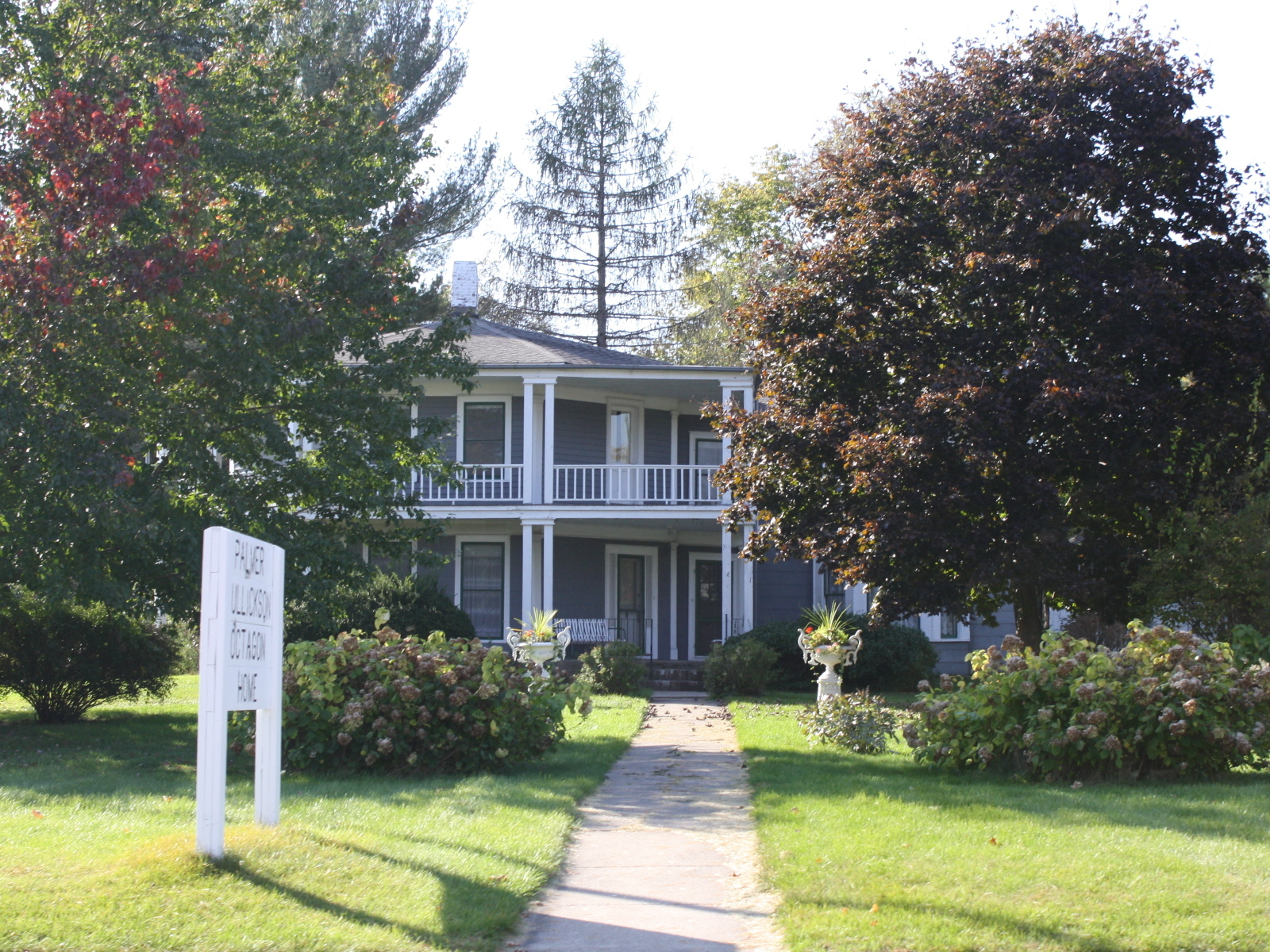
- Palmer-Gullickson Octagon

- Location within Wisconsin Location within the United States
- Location: two locations on Leonard St., West Salem, Wisconsin
- Coordinates: 43°54′5″N 91°4′54″W
- Built: 1856 and 1857
- Architectural style: Octagon Mode
- NRHP reference No.: 79000092
- Added to NRHP: August 07, 1979

The Palmer Brother's Octagons are two historic octagonal houses built by brothers, Dr. Horace Palmer and Monroe Palmer in or near West Salem, Wisconsin.

The Palmer-Gullickson Octagon House, the larger of the two, was built in 1856. With the help of Rachel Gullickson the West Salem Historical society was able to buy this house for preservation and use as a museum. It is located at 358 Leonard St. in West Salem.

The Palmer-Lewis Octagon House was built in 1857. It has been moved to another location on Leonard Street, and attached to a smaller structure.

On August 7, 1979, they were added to the National Register of Historic Places.
