= Hamlin Garland House =

Historic house in Wisconsin, United States

- U.S. National Register of Historic Places
- U.S. National Historic Landmark
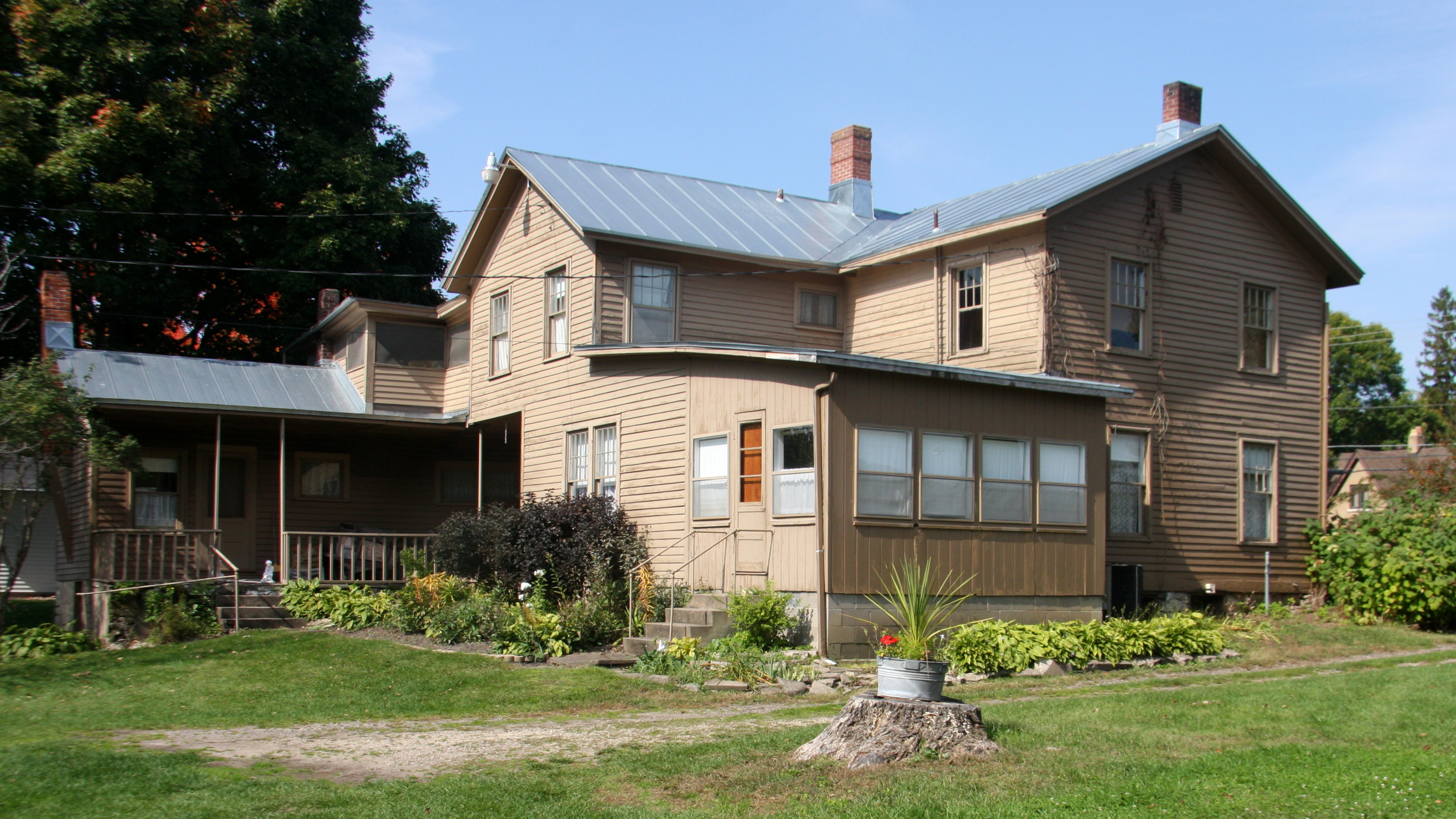
- The house in 2014

- Location within Wisconsin Location within the United States
- Interactive map showing the location of Hamlin Garland House
- Location: 356 W. Garland St., West Salem, Wisconsin
- Coordinates: 43°53′56″N 91°4′51″W
- Built: 1860, renovated 1893 and 1912
- Architect: William Hull
- NRHP reference No.: 71000040

Significant dates
- Added to NRHP: November 11, 1971
- Designated NHL: November 11, 1971

The Hamlin Garland House is a historic house at 357 West Garland Street in West Salem, Wisconsin, USA. It was from 1893 to the 1910s the principal residence of writer Hamlin Garland (1860–1940). Garland was a prominent and well-regarded writer of regional fiction. Designated a National Historic Landmark, it is now a museum managed by the local historical society.

== History ==
Hamlin Garland was born in West Salem in a log cabin in September 1860 on a farm his father bought a year earlier. When he was older, he moved away from Wisconsin and lived elsewhere, particularly in Massachusetts, Iowa, and Illinois. Even so, Garland fondly remembered the place of his birth. As he later recalled: "My Wisconsin birthplace has always been a source of deep satisfaction to me. That a lovely valley should form the first picture in my childhood memories is a priceless endowment... It will always remain a charming and mysterious place to me."

Garland returned to West Salem in 1893 and, using royalties from his successful collection of short stories Main-Travelled Roads (1891), he purchased this home. The house, which stood on four acres, had been built in the same year of Garland's birth by a mason and carpenter named William Hull. Hull sold the home to Rublee Hayes five years later and, by the time Garland bought it from Hayes, the property also included a two-story barn, cow pasture, pig-pen, and gardens of both fruits and flowers. The home was in poor condition and Garland spent much of October 1893 repairing and renovating; he eventually installed indoor plumbing, making it the first home in the area with that innovation. He originally named it Mapleshade because of the three large maples on the property.

Garland brought his parents with him to the home; his mother was impressed with the area right away but his father did not immediately approve. Even so, Garland noted: "This is my choice. Right here we take root. This shall be the Garland Homestead." The house was damaged by fire in 1912 but was quickly repaired. It was an October morning and Garland was awakened by the screams of his wife, Zulime. After attempting to stop the flames with a garden hose, he ran into his study and saved his manuscripts by throwing them from the second-floor window of his study to a neighbor below.

The Garlands lived in this house less frequently after about 1916, when they also had a residence in New York City, and sold it in 1939.

Garland died at age 79, at his home in Hollywood, California, on March 4, 1940. He had asked his ashes to be spread on the hillsides of his West Salem home. Instead, local officials asked to have him buried in the town's Nehonoc Cemetery.

== Modern history ==
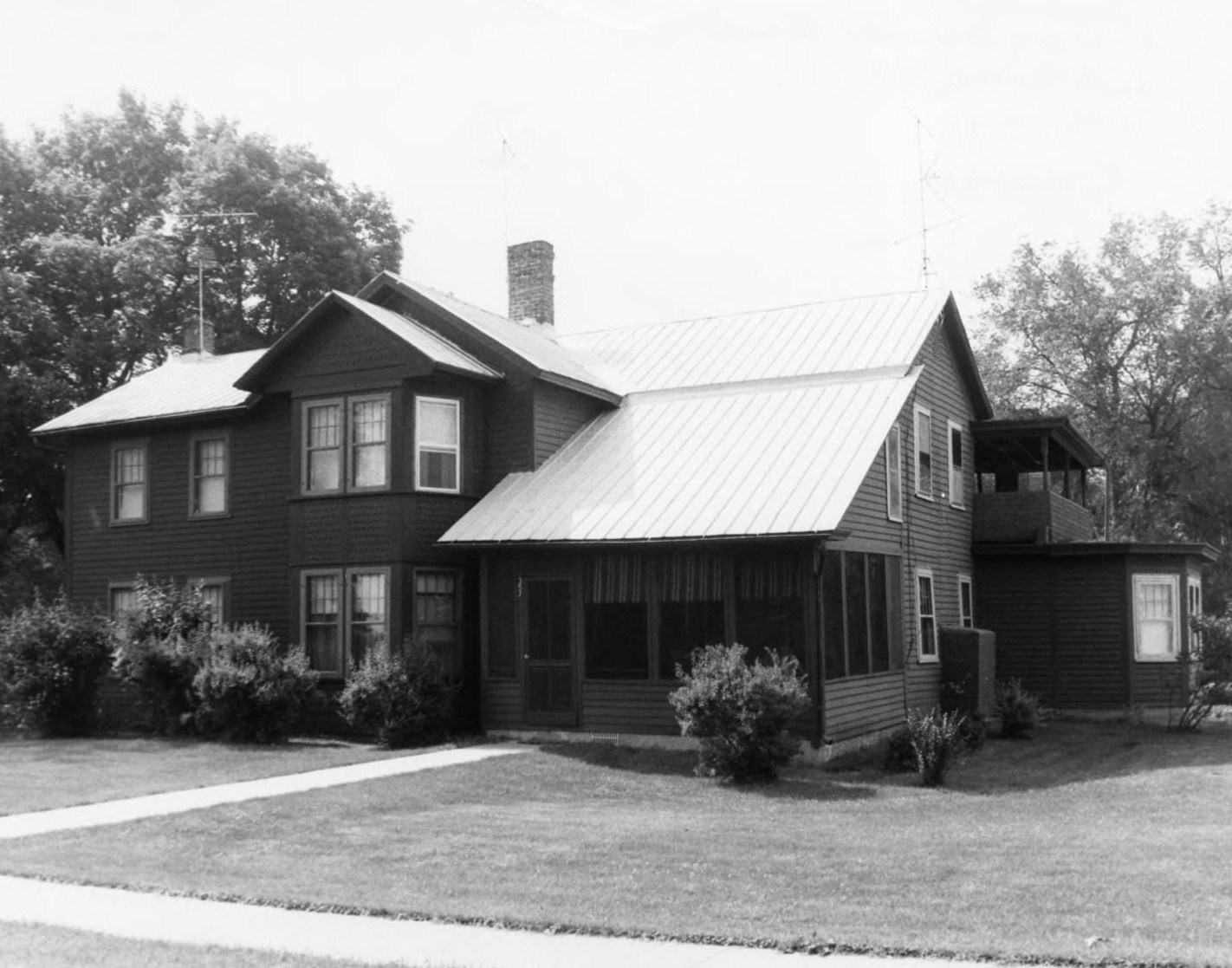
The homestead in 1971

The home was declared a National Historic Landmark in 1971. The street it is on was renamed in honor of the author. Today, the property is managed by the West Salem Historical Society and is open to the public as a museum. In 1960, a historical marker was placed in town in honor of Garland noting his interest in the region.

There are some reports that the home is haunted, possibly by Garland himself due to his unhappiness that his wishes for burial were not followed.

== See also ==
- List of National Historic Landmarks in Wisconsin
- National Register of Historic Places listings in La Crosse County, Wisconsin
