= Jason Edwards: An Average Man =

1892 novel by Hamlin Garland

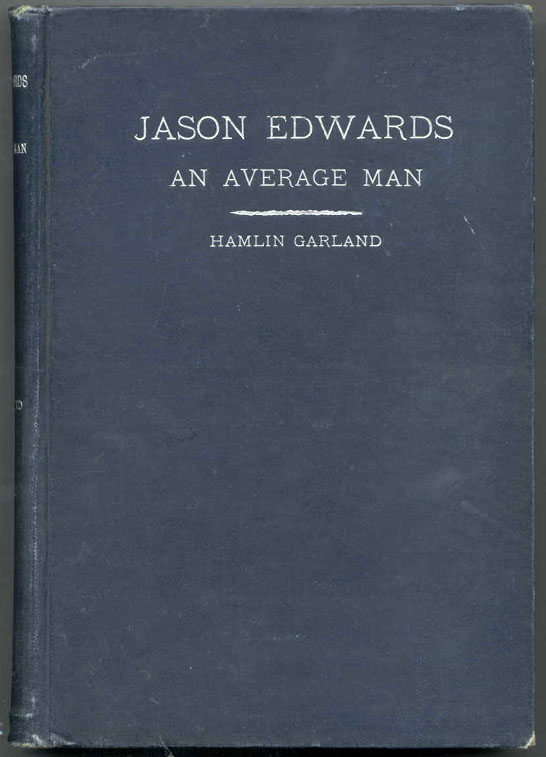
Jason Edwards: An Average Man by Hamlin Garland (1892)

Jason Edwards: an Average Man is an 1892 novel by American author Hamlin Garland. First published by the Arena Publishing Company in Boston, the novel is divided into two parts entitled The Mechanic and The Farmer, respectively. There are two major settings that accompany each section. In the first part, the setting is in Boston and then moves to Boomtown, a prairie town in the Midwest, in the second part. The book takes place over a period of ten years, beginning in 1879 and finishing in 1889, but an important part of the novel takes place in 1884 as well. Most scenes written about in the novel are set in the summer months. Jason Edwards takes place during the Gilded Age in American History.

Garland wrote Jason Edwards to promote the taxation and land reform theories of Henry George.

== Plot ==
=== Part I - The Mechanic ===
The story begins with Garland introducing Walter Reeve, described as level-headed. It was 1869 and he has just arrived in Boston after finishing college and takes stock of his new surroundings. After procuring lodging in this new city, Walter visits the newspaper Events in search of employment. After a short conversation with one of the editors, Walter is told to go see Mr. Dagget, an older editor who decides to give Walter a chance after a few amusing comments from the young man. Walter then resolves to know the town better than anyone, including street names, landmarks, and the people that inhabit them. While studying the city, he sends in stories to Dagget, which are occasionally used by the paper. After continuing his efforts to gain a position at Events and sending in story after story, Walter is eventually given a small salary. His workload becomes heavier and heavier, but he uses it as a chance to show his value. "Life went on amazingly well for him" and within five years Walter becomes the "Dramatic Editor" on the Events with a good salary.

One day in his fifth year in the city, while Walter Reeves is observing the Boston bustle, a girl passes by that catches his eye and stays in his mind as he loses sight of her. He romanticizes about this mysterious girl for weeks when his artist friend, Jerome Austin, convinces him to come out one night. That night Walter sees the mysterious girl, who he sees singing, and finally meets her, learning her name is Alice (Allie) Edwards. He talks with Alice and learns her address, 700 Pleasant Avenue. During their conversation she mentions her father is a mechanic, but it is of no consequence to Walter. Jason Edwards is then introduced as Allie's father when she leaves Walter for the night. He asks about Walter, and Alice replies that he liked her song very much, which her little sister, Linnie, promptly agrees with. We learn that Jason Edwards is a reserved, hard working man, and Alice wishes she could work to give her father rest. Meanwhile, Walter Reeves is completely lovestruck and merry with thoughts of Alice.

One stifling hot day in June, Reeves is walking with Alice along Pleasant Avenue. The scene is a loud and confusing mess, with children and workers running amuck. They arrive at Alice's home, which has the effect of "tasteful economy, but not comfort." Alice sits at the piano in the room, and Mrs. Edwards, Alice's mother, gives the two young people some privacy. Reeves and Alice are alone now. We learn they have been together for a year, and Reeves hopes desperately to marry her as soon as possible. Alice is indefinite in her decision to marry him because she says she is happy now. She says she wants to make her own money, and Reeves responds by calling her a modern woman. Alice claims she can not be dependent and that she wants to work. Eventually, they come to a stalemate when Alice tells Reeves that she can not leave her parents in horrible conditions, and the lovers part ways. Linnie informs everyone that "poppa" (Jason Edwards) is home. Jason Edwards says his work is "one eternal tread-mill" and continues to complain about the increasing struggle. When the family receives a notice that rent will be raised, Jason Edwards has the shadow of defeat across his face. After suffering this new setback, the family eventually resolves to move west, where Edwards claims there is free land and no landlords.

Jason Edwards seems like a new man to everyone. He informs the men at his previous workplace of his plan, where some decide to join and other decline. He uses this time to take in all that he is leaving, and it has never looked worse to him.

Walter Reeves muses over Alice. He attends a man's sermon about poverty, where Reeves has a revelation about the overall discontent in the city. His co-workers praise him the next day for his article on the subject, and then have their own argument about how to remedy the situation. Reeves receives a letter from Alice asking for his presence, and he leaves as Mr. Dagget and the other editors tease him. Reeves believes Alice wants to accept his request for marriage, but then he learns that she and the family are moving to the West. Reeves accuses Alice of leaving him, but Alice defends herself by saying her family needs her. In the end, the lovers part ways again and Alice promises to write.

=== Part II - The Farmer ===
It is an intolerably hot day in Boomtown in July, 1889. Boomtown is the prairie town where the Edwards family now resides. We are introduced to Judge Balser, Frank Graham, and Hank Whiting, who are all lounging in the judge's office. His office is painted with the words: "Land Agent and Attorney-at-Law." The three men speak of tough times and mention that the Edwards family is having a rough time and might go under. We learn that Alice is the only thing stopping the farm from going under with her work as a music teacher. Frank Graham remarks that the West was supposed to be perfect for a poor man, which offends the judge. Judge Balser is the landlord of the West to the Edwards family and many others as we learn he has sold them all land. Another farmer by the name of Elliot stops by at the judge's office. He jokes with the men and tells them about the worrisome harvest that he and Edwards share. After he leaves, the three lounging men spot an approaching figure in the distance, who they label as a tenderfoot.

The figure is Walter Reeves, coming to visit Alice. He has only received cold, formal letters from her. In her absence, his mother moved in with him. Reeves is visiting Alice now because his mother has died, and he wants Alice to come home with him, so he is not alone. Reeves stops by the judge's office hoping to find information about the Edwards family. Judge Balser is putting on a charade to trick Reeves as he enters. Reeves plays along at first, but later drops the act when he learns about the reality of the West, becoming more worried about Alice's condition. Frank befriends him, gives him some unsettling information about the Edwards family, and they go to dinner.

The Edwards homestead is a beaten and shelterless shanty. There is nothing to hide a child against the unyielding sun. Jason Edwards works as hard as ever, and has become bent and lame due to the midwestern farming life. Alice is worn and weary, peering off into the distance, but then sees a carriage approaching. As Edwards staggers out to the fields, Reeves arrive at the shanty to find Alice. Contrary to her letters, Alice longed for his company and Reeves is just as happy to see her. They begin arguing over Alice leaving her family, and Reeves offers an ultimatum. If she does not come with him, then they will never see each other again. Alice is resilient, and Reeves helplessly rides away in the carriage.

Alice is distraught over her decision. Her mother believes she should have left with Reeves. As Mrs. Edwards is comforting her daughter, Judge Balster and Frank Graham arrive at the shanty. Alice pleads for mercy from the judge about the mortgage, but he calmly refuses. Alice is indignant and realizes that life in the West is no different than Boston as they will be homeless again. All visitors leave as Edwards returns home.

Jason Edwards arrives home defeated. He has no hope left and claims his life a failure. After fifty years of labor, he still cannot provide for his family. Mrs. Edwards suggests selling the farm and returning to Boston, but Edwards says no one will buy it. Linnie spots a brewing storm in the distance and alerts the family. They all huddle together as the storm begins, showering the farm. The thunderstorm becomes fierce as hail pounds the shanty and winds rip out the windows.

After the storm ended, the farm is a wreck. The shanty is ruined, and all the crops are flattened beyond repair. Jason Edwards is unconscious and Mrs. Edwards is completely speechless. Alice orders Linnie to go to Mrs. Elliot, and she tries her best to take care of her father and mother.

After Reeves rides away, he regrets his anger and wishes to go back to ask for forgiveness, but the storm stops him. He is forced into Elliot's house for shelter with Frank Graham and Judge Balser as well. Afterwards, Linnie brings word to everyone at the Elliot farm about what happened to her family. They all rush to the shanty, where they find Alice bending over her father. As they all ride to Graham's house for medical attention, Reeves notes nature's forgetfulness of man: "she knows not, and cares nothing."

In the midst of Edwards' shaky state, Reeves and Alice speak again about their life together. Reeves desperately hopes Alice will come with him after this incident, but Alice repeats that her first duty is to her parents. When Edwards wakes from his stupor, he finds everyone standing over him, and is surprised to see Reeves. He realizes the situation and figures he might as well die. Edwards is broken, saying he has been driven out of everywhere, including Derry, Boston, and now the West. "They ain't no landlords in the grave," he says. His family weeps and leave to find him more comfort. While Reeves remains, Edwards realizes he is paralyzed, but forbids Reeves to tell anyone. Reeves realizes he is present at an American tragedy, the collapse of the working man.

Reeves says he will take care of the family from now on, but Edwards refuses, his pride still intact. At last, after an impassioned speech from Reeves about Edwards' heroic worldwide battle against hunger and cold, he relents and allows Reeves to bring him back to Derry. Reeves will finally be with Jason Edwards will receive the rest he desires. In the final scene of the novel, the family and Reeves are heading back on a train, and Edwards smiles as the sun streams across his daughter's heads.

== Characters ==
=== Major characters ===
- Walter Reeves - A stalwart figure with "laughing eyes" and a moustache who is described as level-headed. He grew up in New England and starts his life in Boston as a newspaper editor for Daily Events. He falls in love with Alice Edwards and is devoted to her from the moment they meet. He tries to convince Alice to marry him, but is turned down repeatedly by what he calls the "modern woman." He is the successful middle-class of the Gilded Age who enjoyed prosperity during this time.
- Alice (Allie) Edwards - She is the love interest of Walter Reeves. She is a singer trying to go to school to make it her profession. She is strong-willed and has a lot of pride in her work and family. Walter Reeves describes her as the "modern woman," which is appropriate because the Progressive Era is approaching where women played a larger role in society.
- Jason Edwards - Father of Alice. He is middle-aged with a gray beard. He is reserved in acts of tenderness and affection, and cares most about his family. He works very hard, but is always in poverty. His obstinate pride will never allow him to accept charity. He represents the farmers and industrial workers that suffered from under-pay and over-work.
- Jennie Edwards - Wife of Jason Edwards. She comforts the family when they are confused and helpless. She plays the role of a traditional wife in the generation before Alice.
- Judge Balser - He is the Edwards family unofficial landlord in the West. He is only interested in money and himself. He is the unfeeling, unyielding force that keeps farmers and industrial workers alike at the same economic level all their lives.
- Frank Graham - He is a witty observer in the West who knows the reality of the situation. Although he will never do anything to stop it, he is a friend to Walter Reeves when he visits, and helps Jason Edwards recover from his unconsciousness. Frank is similar to Walter if he had made something of himself in the West. They have similar personalities and Frank represents the middle class in the West.

=== Minor characters ===
- Mr. Dagget - An editor at the newspaper Events. He gives Walter Reeves a chance and eventually hires him. He moralizes about life and the people around him. Reeves later describes Dagget as a "cynical, hard, dry old man."
- Jerome Austin - An artist of Walter Reeves that he makes in Boston. He acts impetuously and seems to enjoy parties.
- Linne Edwards - Sister of Alice Edwards. She is daddy's little girl, and calls Edwards "poppa".
- Mrs. Holway - A music teacher who might have an interest in Alice. Alice and Reeves say she is dense.
- Mrs. Murtaugh - A large, flabby Irish woman neighboring the Edwards family in Boston. She interrupts Reeves and Alice in a conversation; Reeves calls her a "scourge."
- Merrill - Co-worker of Reeves who is also upset at the current economic conditions.
- Jerry Sullivan - Stalwart Irishman who stays behind after Edwards leaves work as a mechanic. He may realize that there is no difference between farmer and mechanic.
- Julius Berg - German man who wants to protest working conditions. Instead, he decides to follow Edwards west.
- Mr. Henry George - Orator who speaks about the injustices of the city. While listening to him, Reeves has a revelation about the general discontent of the city.
- Hank Whiting - Resident of Boomtown. He is the proprietor of "Western House."
- Nasby Blume - Postmaster of Boomtown.
- (Happy) Elliot - Large, whiskered man. He is a farmer who falls into tough times along with Edwards, but keeps his sense of humor.
- Daddy Ruble - Old man who argues with Johnson often. His arguments give Frank Graham fits of laughter.
- Johnson - Somewhat younger man who is starting to disbelieve there will be a boom. He argues with Daddy Ruble constantly, and provides Frank with comic relief.
- Charley Severson - A man who went crazy under the pressures of western life. He is sent to an insane asylum, leaving behind his wife and daughter.

== Themes ==
Hamlin Garland is an author who is best known for his work involving the hard-working Midwestern farmer. Jason Edwards is about the widening social gap between classes during the Gilded Age, and the injustices that lower-class workers suffered. Industrial work is compared to frontier hardships through the story of Jason Edwards, a man who suffers disappointment his entire life. We witness the collapse of the working man as Edwards struggles against falling wages and rising rents. He never escapes this problem even in the West, demonstrating the hopelessness and tragedy of the average working man's situation. They are forever subjugated to big bosses and landlords.

Edwards has had a terribly unfulfilled life, but in the end of the novel he smiles. He sees his daughters escaping from the difficult life he had, and knows that they will not share his hardship for the rest of their lives. Alice could have left with Reeves earlier, and Reeves could have helped the entire family with his wealth, but Alice and her father have too much pride to neglect their duties. Alice feels her family needs her support, and Edwards needs to support his family with his own two hands. Edwards is a product of his society, a hard-working individual who feels his work is his freedom, yet it subdues him. Pride is important to Garland, and he thinks it an inevitable part of personality, but as shown by the ending of Jason Edwards, he also understands that it is another obstacle to overcome in order to gain freedom.

The romance between Walter Reeves and Alice Edwards follows a classic story. Boy meets girl, boy falls in love, and then marriage follows, except marriage never came to these two. Although the novel revolves around their desperate attempt to be together, they never marry during the story. Neither of them has any fatal condition and their parents have no complaints, but Alice repeatedly refuses his marriage proposals. Their detained bondage is a result of the working man's plight, in this case Jason Edwards' hardship. The troubles of the time affect all aspects of life, even love. The fact that they cannot be together can be traced back to her family's poor economic conditions due to her father's horrible job. The dysfunctional relationship between Reeves and Alice is just another product of society, and proves the strength of the oppressive times.

== Reception and Sales ==
Jason Edwards was Hamlin Garland's first published novel, but "critics found little to commend." According to Keith Newlin's Hamlin Garland: a life, Garland was praised for his talents of description, but everything else seemed bland. He had a tendency to "focus on the exterior rather than the interior." In response to Jason Edwards, the Chicago Tribune asserted that Garland "paints a terrible picture and he paints it well."

After his novels were criticized for their "bludgeon-like quality of realism," his career diminished. Around this time, he even quit his teaching position at the Boston School of Oratory, so his primary source of income was from his writing. "More disheartening than the sneering criticism was the disappointing sales..." From 1891 to 1893, Garland earned $612.85 from his publishings. From Jason Edwards alone 2,378 copies in paper were sold and 212 copies in cloth were sold, which was little but not uncommon. He later remarked to a reporter, "Where literature fails financially is in bookmaking."

Garland moved around cities, from Boston to New York City, and to Chicago trying to find the right publishing firm. No matter where he went, he had a difficult time financially. Later when he was preparing to publish works in Chicago he wrote a series of letters to his publisher. In these letters Garland discusses monetary concerns mostly. The analyst of these letters, John T. Flanagan, remarks, "Garland was increasingly disturbed by the failure of his books to sell and by his consequently limited income."
