= Golf in the Year 2000 =

1892 novel book by J. McCullough

- Title page for Golf in the Year 2000 (1892)
- Author: J. McCullough
- Language: English
- Genre: science fiction
- Set in: 2000
- Publication date: 1892
- Publication place: UK
- Media type: book

Golf in the Year 2000, or, What We Are Coming To is an 1892 novel by J. McCullough. It is a specimen of science fiction of the Victorian era, and an example of time travel in fiction. It tells the story of Alexander J. Gibson, who falls into a deep sleep in 1892 and awakens in 2000.

== Plot ==
The plot follows Gibson as he is introduced to the wonders of the dawning 21st century by his host, the current owner of the house where Gibson lay sleeping for 108 years. Like Gibson, the host is a passionate golf player. Much of the story revolves around the two men's visits to the golf course, where Gibson learns first-hand the radical changes that technology has made to the game. There are golf clubs that automatically keep their user's score, driverless golf caddies or carts, and special jackets, which everyone must wear, that yell "Fore!" whenever the player begins his swing.

== Analysis ==
Modern readers are fascinated by the many startlingly accurate "predictions" contained in Golf in the Year 2000. These include bullet trains, digital watches, and television (although those specific terms are not used). It correctly predicts the conversion of the British pound to decimal coins. It notably fails to anticipate modern air travel, instead postulating that undersea trains will cut trans-Atlantic travel time to a few hours. Similarly, Gibson's jest about travel to the Moon is answered with an explanation that this is still a few generations off. It anticipates a form of chemical warfare, but suggests a very different impact.

One of the novel's "predictions" is the liberation of women. In the book, women have achieved substantial equality with men, but with some remaining and new differences. Gibson learns that the women of 2000 dress like men, hold key positions in business (bank clerks are exclusively female) and government (but not yet prime minister, due to petty rivalries), and in fact do almost all of the work, while the men play golf full-time. In the view of the fictional narrator, this is a true utopia, though he does not find women of the year 2000 to his liking.

== Editions ==
The book was originally published in London by Unwin in 1892. A rare first edition sold at auction in January 2005 for $2,240 to an American collector of golf memorabilia named James Espinola. The book was reprinted in 1998 by Rutledge Hill Press, and is also available online.
