= John T. Flanagan =

American academic

John Theodore Flanagan (January 15, 1906 – March 11, 1996) was an American professor of literature at the University of Minnesota and the University of Illinois who specialized in early literature of the Midwest. He was born in St. Paul, Minnesota, and earned a bachelor, master, and PhD degrees from the University of Minnesota.

== Biography ==
John T. Flanagan was born January 15, 1906.

Flanagan taught for one year at the University of North Dakota in Fargo before receiving an appointment to the University of Minnesota in 1929, where he taught until 1945. He wrote many articles during this period, especially for the Minnesota Historical Journal. In the winter of 1939 he was a visiting lecturer in American Literature at Pomona College. In 1943 he was awarded a Guggenheim fellowship.

In 1945 he became professor at the University of Illinois, where he spent the remainder of his career, retiring in 1972. During his time at the University of Illinois he also was a Fulbright lecturer at Bordeaux, Ghent, Liège and Brussels, as well as a visiting lecturer at universities in Kyoto, Moscow and Leningrad.

When Flanagan received an award for distinguished contributions from the Society for the Study of Midwestern Literature in 1977, he reflected on his career and how early on there were few programs teaching American literature, and never studied American literature formally as a student himself. Nevertheless, he decided this would be a focus of his teaching, and his professional growth thus paralleled the emergence of the discipline. He also did not expect that he would become one of the foremost experts in literature of the trans-Appalachian west (now known as the Midwest, but in the hey day of its settlement by Euro-Americans known as "the West"), yet he became that and published copiously both in journals and in books on a wide range of related subjects.

In addition to the Guggenheim fellowship he also received a fellowship from the Newberry Library. He was a member of Phi Beta Kappa, the Illinois State Historical Society and the Minnesota Historical Society.

Flanagan was the grandson of Theodore Hamm, founder of the Hamm's Brewery.

After Flanagan formally retired he remained active in his organizational roles and as a writer well into his 80s. In 1993 he moved to Salt Lake City where he died in 1996. He was survived by three daughters, four grandchildren and two great-grandchildren.

== Works ==
- McDowell, Tremaine; Rogers, Winfield Heyser; Flanagan, John T.; Blaine, Harold A., eds. (1938). American Sketchbook. New York: Macmillan Co. OCLC 638316.
- Flanagan, John T., ed. (1945). America is West: An Anthology of Middlewestern Life and Literature. Minneapolis: University of Minnesota Press. OCLC 1326340.
- Flanagan, John T.; Hudson, Arthur Palmer (1958). Folklore in American Literature. Evanston, IL: Row, Peterson. ISBN 0837155878.
- Flanagan, John T., ed. (1964). William Joseph Snelling's Tales of the Northwest. Minneapolis, MN: University of Minnesota Press. OCLC 2994337.
- Flanagan, John T. (1971). James Hall, Literary Pioneer of the Ohio Valley. New York: Russell & Russell. OCLC 858414116.
- Flanagan, John T. (1974). Edgar Lee Masters: The Spoon River Poet and His Critics. Metuchen, NJ: Scarecrow Press. ISBN 0810807416. OCLC 1054389.
- Flanagan, John T. (1977). Theodore Blegen, A Memoir. Northfield, MN: Norwegian-American Historical Association. OCLC 4035705.
- Flanagan, John T. (1989). Theodore Hamm in Minnesota: His Family and Brewery. St. Paul, MN: Pogo Press. ISBN 0961776757. OCLC 19998046.
- Flanagan, John T. (1993). Minnesota's Literary Visitors. St. Paul, MN: Pogo Press. ISBN 1880654016. OCLC 28207072.
- Downs, Robert B.; Flanagan, John T.; Scott, Harold W. (1983). Memorable Americans, 1750-1950. Littleton, CO: Libraries Unlimited. ISBN 0872873609.
- Downs, Robert B.; Flanagan, John T.; Scott, Harold W. (1985). More Memorable Americans, 1750-1950. Littleton, CO: Libraries Unlimited. ISBN 0872874214. OCLC 11495543.
