= A Member of the Third House =

Novel by Hamlin Garland

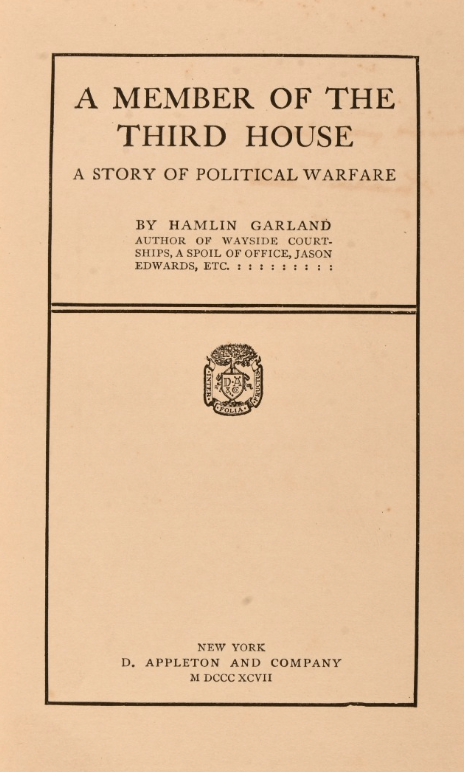
- Title page for A Member of the Third House (1897)
- Author: Hamlin Garland
- Language: English
- Publisher: D. Appleton & Company
- Publication date: 1897
- Publication place: United States
- Media type: Print (hardback & paperback)
- Pages: 239 pages (hardback & paperback)

A Member of the Third House is an 1897 novel by American author Hamlin Garland. The story takes place at the turn of the 20th century in New England. The story revolves around a local politician and his conquest to destroy a railroad monopoly.

== Plot summary ==
In a New England metropolis, local politician Wilson Tuttle has a brief conversation with a Mr. Holbrook regarding the Consolidated Railway, which is attempting to secure a charter to become a monopoly. The Consolidated Railway has been using a corrupt political group called the Third House to gain political support. Following his meeting with Holbrook, Tuttle accompanies senator's daughter Evelyn Ward and Helene Davis, the daughter of the president of Consolidated Railway, for some ice cream.

At the office of Tom Brennan and Samuel Fox, two legislators arrive for a meeting. Brennan gains their political support through the means of a bribe. Evelyn and Helene stop by and ask Brennan what he knows about the Third House.

Later that afternoon, Lawrence Davis and Samuel Fox discuss the recent state of their company and the problematic activities of Tuttle. Knowing that Tuttle cannot be fixed like many other politicians, they realize their charter must be passed before Tuttle passes his bill to open an investigation into Continental's activities.

Evelyn's father, Senator Rufus Ward, arrives at Brennan's office. Desperately seeking money for an investment, he begs for Brennan's help. Brennan offers Ward money in exchange for his support.

At the popular summer getaway of Waterside, Brennan, Tuttle, Evelyn, and Helene engage in a friendly game of tennis. Brennan attempts to propose to Helene, but she says she needs time. Later, Tuttle warns Helene about how he believes Brennan is using her and her father for personal gains. After dinner, Davis and Fox discover Tuttle's evidence has recently been published in the newspapers. Despite their anger with him, Tuttle claims he will proceed with the investigation.

Tuttle's investigation has hit the papers and some of his opposition is experiencing a change of heart. His next target is Pat Murnahn, a covert member of the Third House and a possible inside source. An anonymous source suggests Tuttle turn his focus to Senator Ward. Supposedly, Ward has been bribed and his timid nature might make him the prime target for the investigation.

Davis arrives at Ward's house and the two discuss their worries for Tuttle. Following Davis’ departure, Tuttle arrives to interrogate Ward. Tuttle makes it clear that if Ward does not betray his colleagues, he will be betraying the state. Ward succumbs to Tuttle's questioning and admits he indeed accepted a bribe.

The investigation proceeds to court, where Tuttle wins. Davis, Brennan, and Fox are released on bail.

In the bar of a local hotel, Brennan has a casual drink. The bartender notifies Brennan he is being followed by a detective. Brennan immediately sneaks out to another hotel across town, where he collects some supplies and changes his appearance. Brennan travels to see Davis and informs him that members of the Third House are skipping town as quickly as possible. Brennan says he has a boat waiting and Davis needs to come with him. Davis remains indecisive and Brennan sneaks out the back door. After a few moments, Davis reaches for his gun and takes his life. Brennan reaches the docks and boards the boat to freedom.

== Characters ==
=== Wilson Tuttle ===
Wilson Tuttle is a character in this novel. A student of politics, Tuttle opposes the actions of the Consolidated Railway and the Third House. He hopes the success of this endeavor will result in his running for Congress. Tuttle also has feelings for Senator Ward's daughter, Evelyn.

=== Tom Brennan ===
Hailing from a poor Irish background, Tom Brennan achieved success through his deceitful wit and charisma. Following a brief career as a lawyer, Lawrence Davis hired Brennan as a lobbyist for the railroad company. His addiction to power leads Brennan to manipulate Davis in hopes of becoming the superintendent of the company. Brennan also maintains a relationship with Davis's daughter, Helene, throughout the novel.

=== Lawrence Davis ===
Lawrence Davis is the powerful President of the Consolidated Railway. Davis bought political support from the Third House to monopolize his business. Despite involvement with corrupt politics, Davis is a righteous man at heart. This becomes clear when he takes his life after reminiscing about his past decisions. He is also the father of Helene Davis.

=== Helene Davis ===
The daughter of Lawrence Davis, Helene is a jovial young lady. She maintains a relationship with Tom Brennan throughout the novel. Despite being at the center of the political scandal, Helene's naïve nature creates distance between her and the situation at stake.

=== Rufus Ward ===
Rufus Ward is a Senator as well as the owner of a struggling business. An upstanding citizen, his only negative trait is his timid nature. Financial struggles forced him to become involved with the Third House conspiracy. Regardless, at Tuttle's request, Ward is the only one to turn against the Third House. Unlike many of the other politicians in this novel, Ward becomes the hero by staying true to his values even if it leads to his demise. He is also the father of Evelyn Ward.

=== Evelyn Ward ===
The daughter of Rufus Ward, Evelyn is a friend with Helene, Brennan and Tuttle. Like her father, she is a moral, selfless woman. Evelyn assists Tuttle in convincing Ward to testify in court against the Third House. Evelyn is also very fond of Tuttle.

== Criticism ==
Being one of Hamlin Garland's less famous works, no real criticism for A Member of the Third House exists. However, Garland's writing style has been thoroughly analyzed throughout the years. Classified as a realist, Garland strongly affirmed distaste for the treatment of romantic passion in fiction. This notion clearly appears in A Member of the Third House. A host of male characters dominate the story while the few female characters retain a limited role. Garland's abundant affectionate recollections of male comrades suggest that he was incapable of exploring publicly the importance of heterosexual intercourse. This attitude could, of course, be simply a continuation of the nineteenth-century attitudes of masculine dominance in a society. Although there is a foundation in A Member of the Third House for heterosexual romance, Garland dismisses the opportunity, placing his focus on the real, political issues at stake. Nevertheless, Garland provides countless vivid descriptions of his male characters and their interactions effectively weave together the story.
