= West Salem, Wisconsin =

- Village
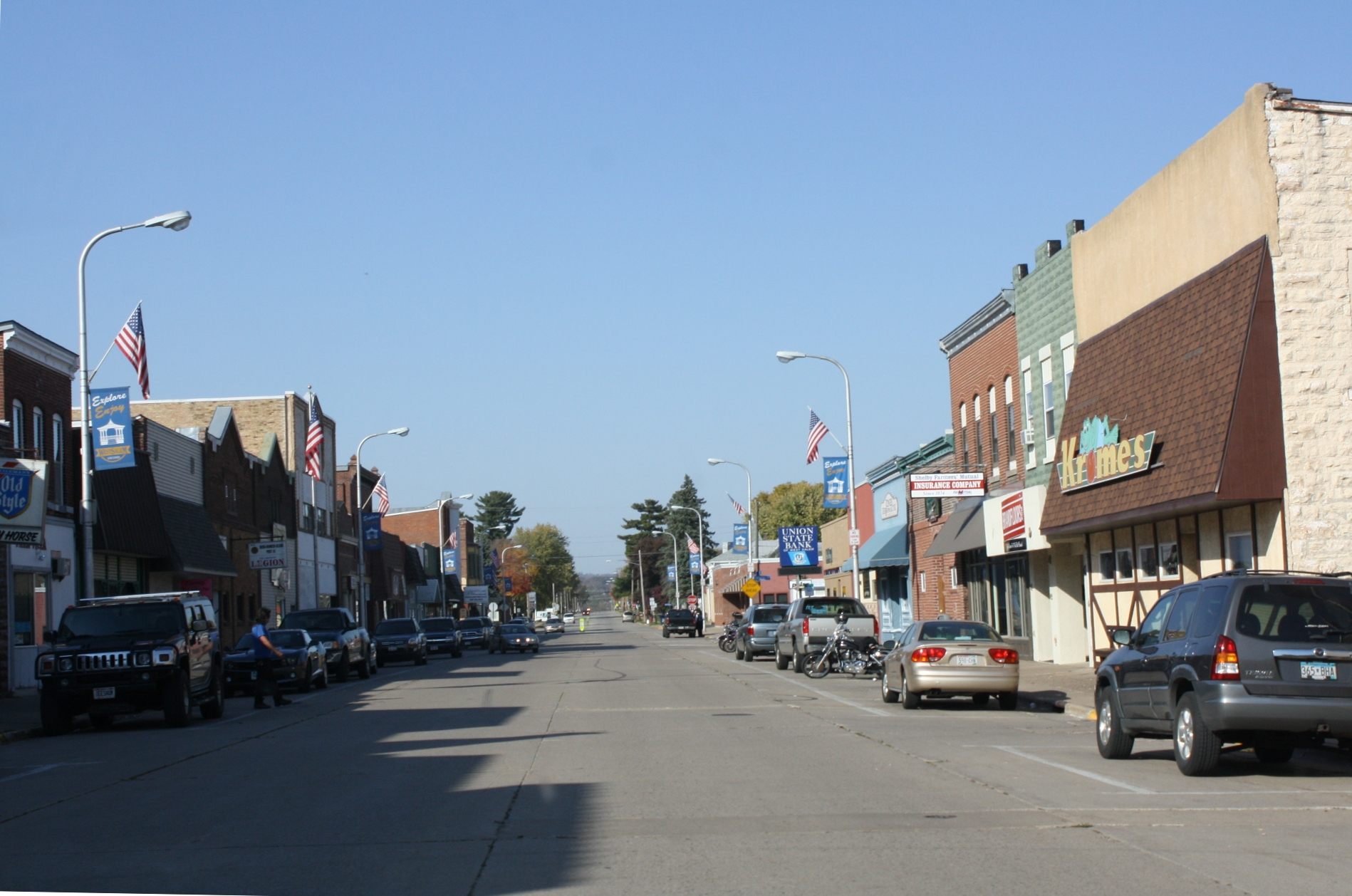
- Downtown

- Location of West Salem in La Crosse County, Wisconsin.

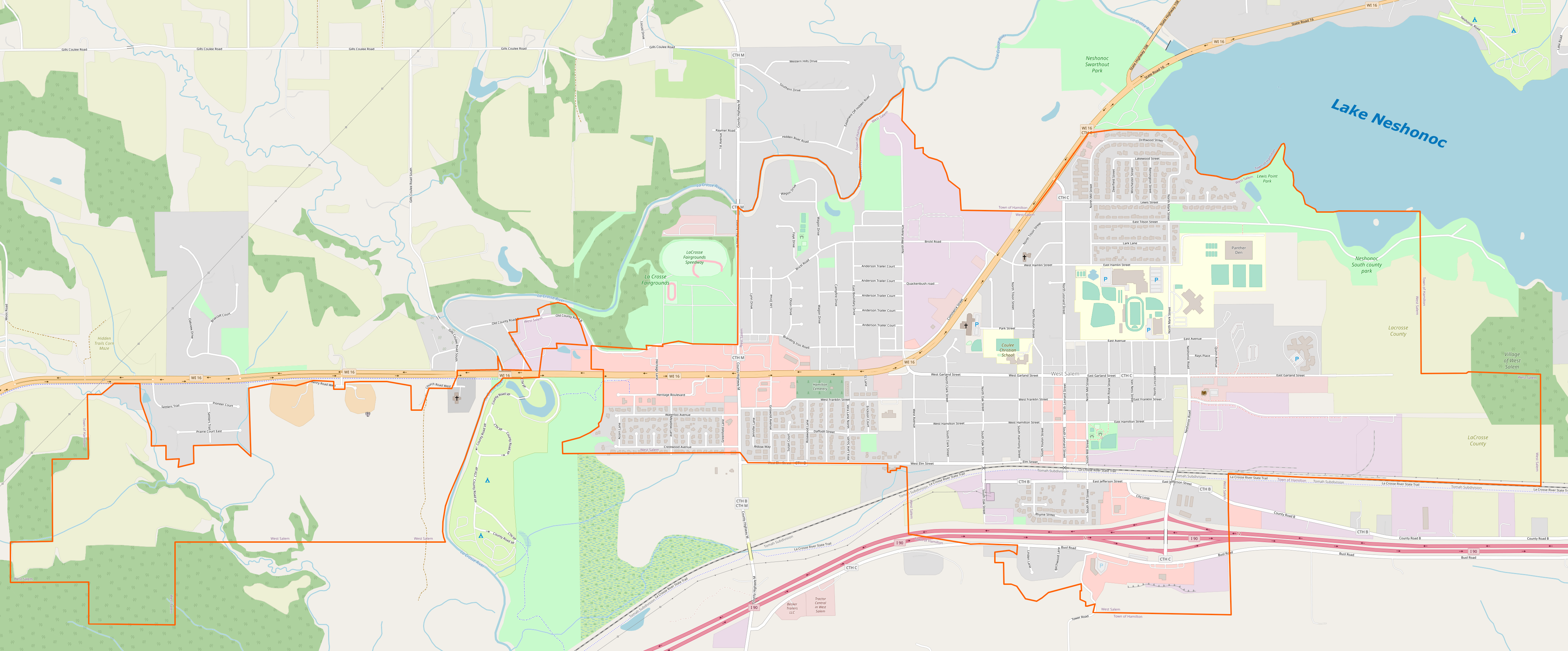
- Village limits
- Coordinates: 43°53′59″N 91°5′12″W
- Country: United States
- State: Wisconsin
- County: La Crosse

Government
  - Type: President - board of trustees
  - Village President: Scott Schumacher
  - Village Administrator: Teresa DeLong

Area
  - Total: 3.41 sq mi (8.82 km^{2})
  - Land: 3.35 sq mi (8.67 km^{2})
  - Water: 0.058 sq mi (0.15 km^{2})
- Elevation: 741 ft (226 m)

Population (2020)
  - Total: 5,277
  - Estimate (2022): 5,289 ▲
  - Density: 1,498.8/sq mi (578.68/km^{2})
- Time zone: UTC-6 (Central (CST))
  - Summer (DST): UTC-5 (CDT)
- Postal code: 54669
- Area code: 608
- FIPS code: 55-86275
- GNIS feature ID: 1576552
- Website: westsalemwi.gov

West Salem is a village in La Crosse County, Wisconsin, United States, along the La Crosse River. It is part of the La Crosse-Onalaska, WI-MN Metropolitan Statistical Area. The population was 5,277 as of the 2020 census.

== History ==
West Salem was platted in 1856. It was named Salem by a Baptist minister named Elder Card because the word meant "peace" in Arabic and Hebrew. The word West was added to the name when mail was confused with another town in the state named Salem.

The donation of approximately ten acres of land to a railway company led to the creation of West Salem. A station was built in West Salem on the original Milwaukee and La Crosse Railway which ran to La Crosse. It was later taken over by the Chicago, Milwaukee and St. Paul Railway (later becoming the Chicago, Milwaukee, St. Paul and Pacific Railroad). The railway used the land to build a depot and tracks.

== Geography ==
West Salem is located at 43°53′59″N 91°5′12″W (43.899795, -91.086614).

According to the United States Census Bureau, the village has a total area of 3.44 square miles (8.91 km^{2}), of which 3.42 square miles (8.86 km^{2}) is land and 0.02 square miles (0.05 km^{2}) is water.

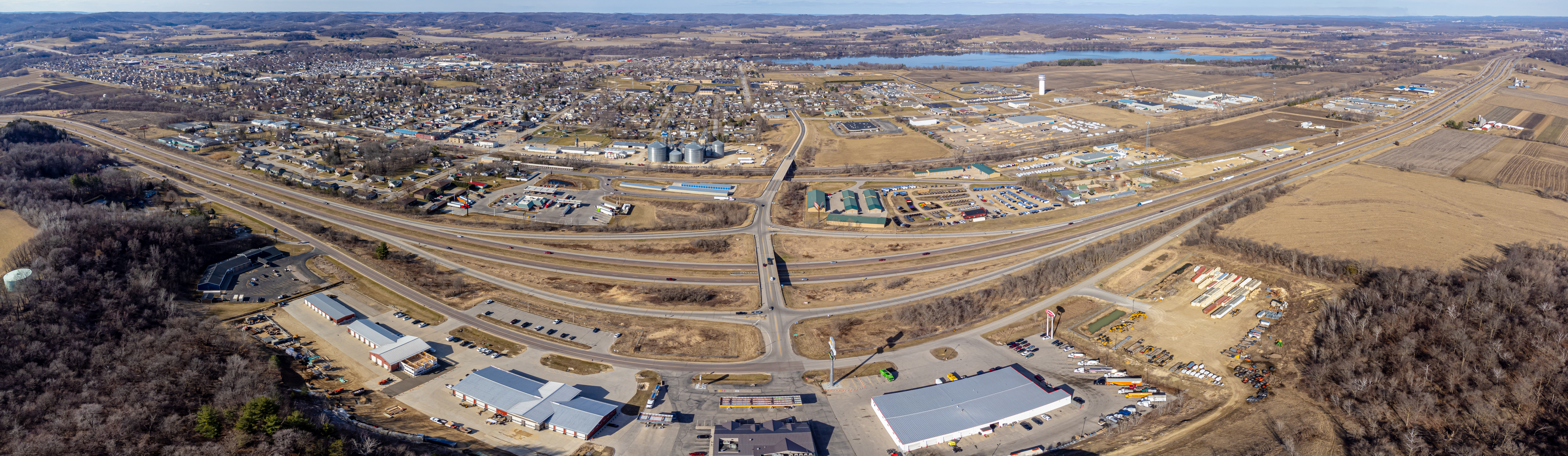

== Demographics ==
Historical population
Census	Pop.	Note	%±
1880	432		—
1890	542		25.5%
1900	725		33.8%
1910	840		15.9%
1920	1,027		22.3%
1930	1,011		−1.6%
1940	1,254		24.0%
1950	1,376		9.7%
1960	1,707		24.1%
1970	2,180		27.7%
1980	3,276		50.3%
1990	3,611		10.2%
2000	4,540		25.7%
2010	4,799		5.7%
2020	5,277		10.0%
2022 (est.)	5,289	▲	0.2%
U.S. Decennial Census

=== 2020 census ===
As of the 2020 census, West Salem had a population of 5,277. The median age was 40.5 years. 25.7% of residents were under the age of 18 and 19.6% of residents were 65 years of age or older. For every 100 females there were 92.5 males, and for every 100 females age 18 and over there were 87.5 males age 18 and over.

96.2% of residents lived in urban areas, while 3.8% lived in rural areas.

There were 2,104 households in West Salem, of which 31.9% had children under the age of 18 living in them. Of all households, 50.0% were married-couple households, 14.1% were households with a male householder and no spouse or partner present, and 28.8% were households with a female householder and no spouse or partner present. About 29.4% of all households were made up of individuals and 14.8% had someone living alone who was 65 years of age or older.

There were 2,165 housing units, of which 2.8% were vacant. The homeowner vacancy rate was 0.9% and the rental vacancy rate was 4.9%.

Racial composition as of the 2020 census
Race	Number	Percent
White	4,880	92.5%
Black or African American	30	0.6%
American Indian and Alaska Native	21	0.4%
Asian	71	1.3%
Native Hawaiian and Other Pacific Islander	0	0.0%
Some other race	44	0.8%
Two or more races	231	4.4%
Hispanic or Latino (of any race)	134	2.5%

=== 2010 census ===
As of the census of 2010, there were 4,799 people, 1,831 households, and 1,259 families living in the village. The population density was 1,403.2 inhabitants per square mile (541.8/km^{2}). There were 1,869 housing units at an average density of 546.5 per square mile (211.0/km^{2}). The racial makeup of the village was 96.7% White, 0.4% African American, 0.6% Native American, 0.7% Asian, 0.3% from other races, and 1.3% from two or more races. Hispanic or Latino of any race were 1.2% of the population.

There were 1,831 households, of which 37.2% had children under the age of 18 living with them, 53.2% were married couples living together, 10.9% had a female householder with no husband present, 4.6% had a male householder with no wife present, and 31.2% were non-families. 26.9% of all households were made up of individuals, and 11.9% had someone living alone who was 65 years of age or older. The average household size was 2.48 and the average family size was 2.99.

The median age in the village was 39.2 years. 26% of residents were under the age of 18; 6.3% were between the ages of 18 and 24; 25.5% were from 25 to 44; 26.3% were from 45 to 64; and 15.9% were 65 years of age or older. The gender makeup of the village was 47.4% male and 52.6% female.

=== 2000 census ===
As of the census of 2000, there were 4,541 people, 1,706 households, and 1,230 families living in the village. The population density was 1,911.2 people per square mile (736.5/km^{2}). There were 1,765 housing units at an average density of 743.0 per square mile (286.3/km^{2}). The racial makeup of the village was 98.04% White, 0.51% African American, 0.42% Native American, 0.44% Asian, 0.07% from other races, and 0.53% from two or more races. Hispanic or Latino of any race were 0.59% of the population.

There were 1,706 households, out of which 41.4% had children under the age of 18 living with them, 59.0% were married couples living together, 9.3% had a female householder with no husband present, and 27.9% were non-families. 23.6% of all households were made up of individuals, and 10.3% had someone living alone who was 65 years of age or older. The average household size was 2.61 and the average family size was 3.09.

In the village, the population was spread out, with 30.0% under the age of 18, 6.3% from 18 to 24, 31.9% from 25 to 44, 18.9% from 45 to 64, and 12.8% who were 65 years of age or older. The median age was 34 years. For every 100 females, there were 95.6 males. For every 100 females age 18 and over, there were 86.6 males.

The median income for a household in the village was $43,449, and the median income for a family was $50,176. Males had a median income of $34,459 versus $22,439 for females. The per capita income for the village was $19,904. About 3.3% of families and 3.5% of the population were below the poverty line, including 4.0% of those under age 18 and 3.4% of those age 65 or over.

== Government ==
The village president is Scott Schumacher. The village administrator is Teresa DeLong. The village clerk/treasurer is Ashley Bohl.

== Education ==
The public West Salem School District consists of:

- West Salem Elementary School
- West Salem Middle School
- West Salem High School

The private schools are:

- Coulee Region Christian School
- Christ Saint John's Lutheran School

== Economy ==
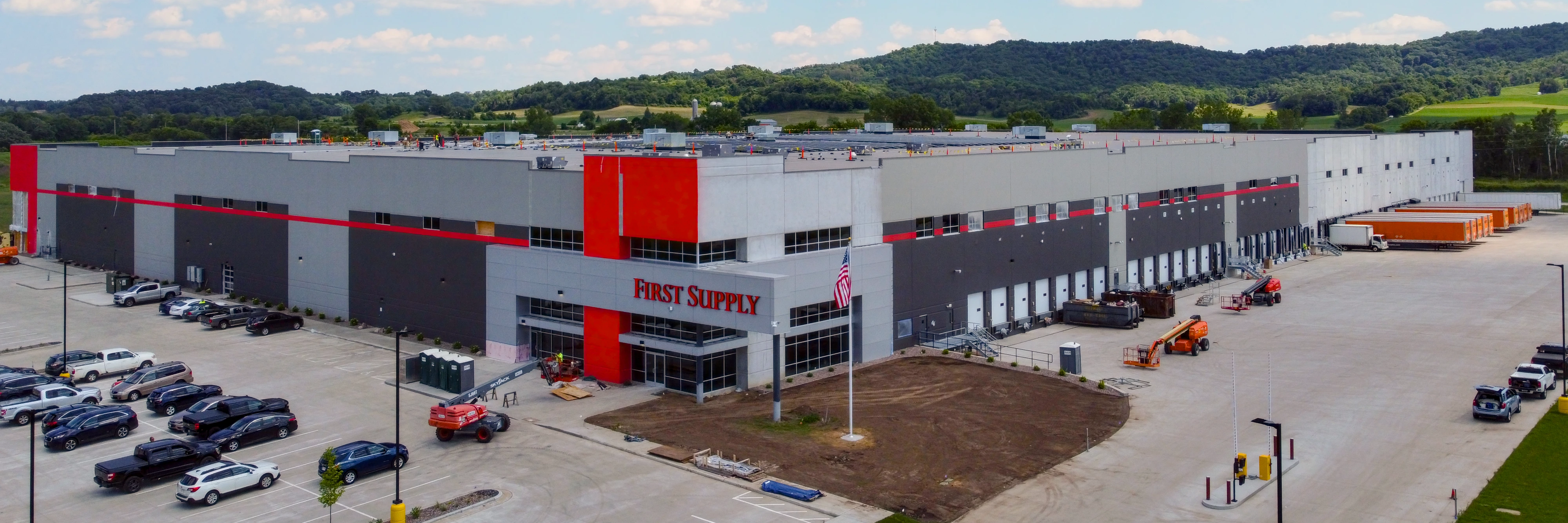
First Supply

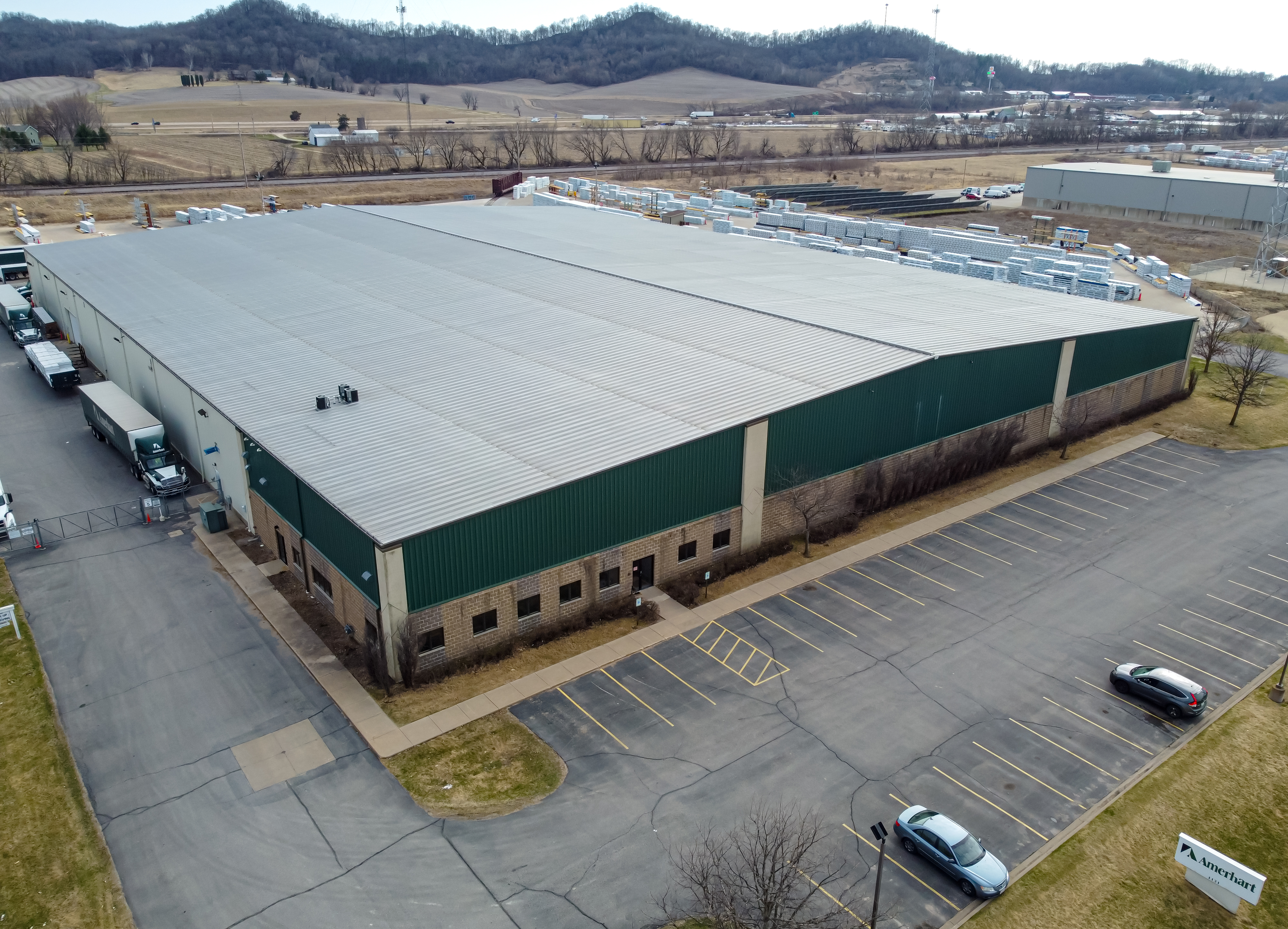
Amerhart

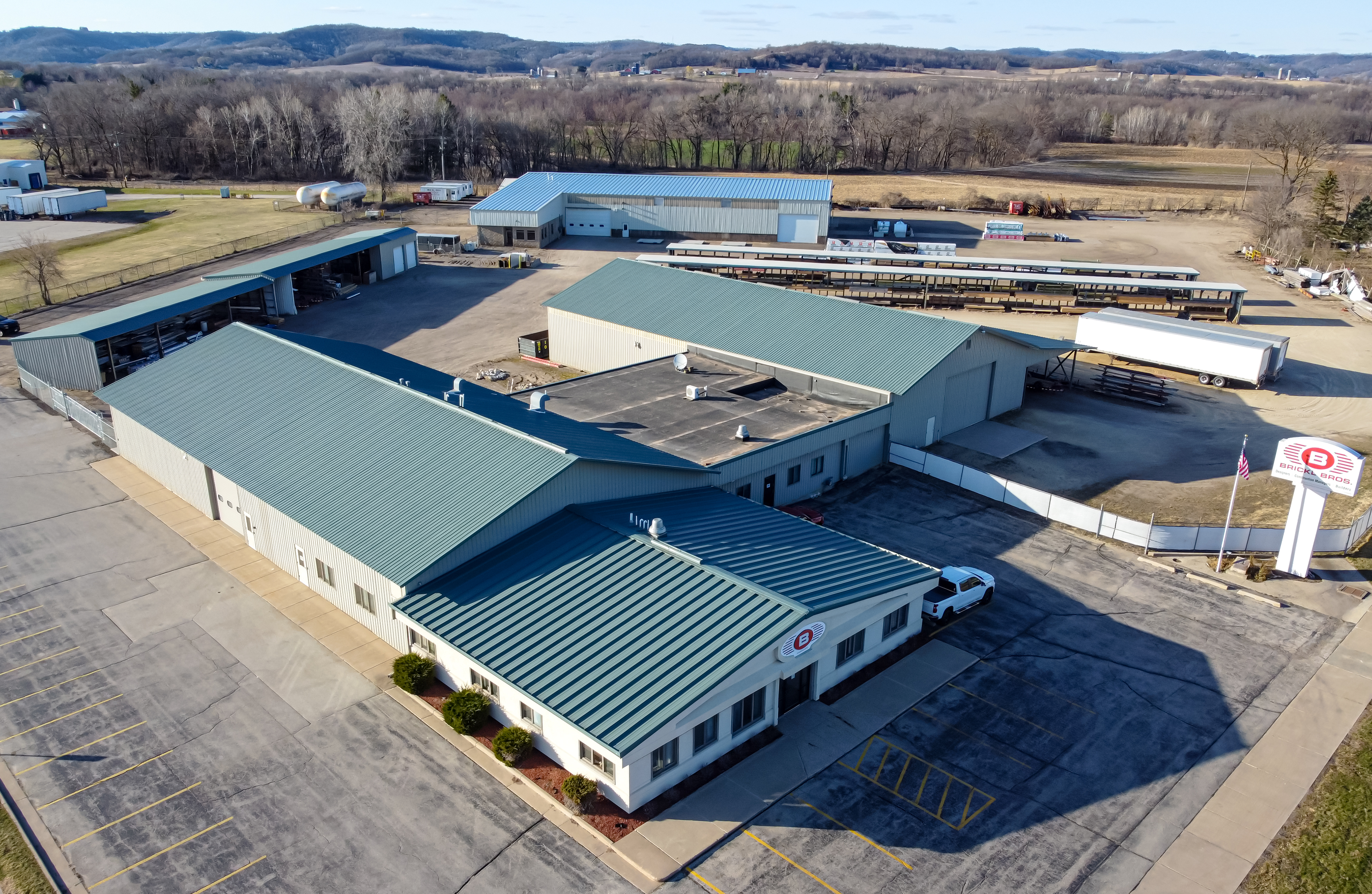
Brickl Brothers

== Transportation ==
Bus service towards La Crosse or Tomah is provided three times daily per direction by Scenic Mississippi Regional Transit.

== Historic sites ==
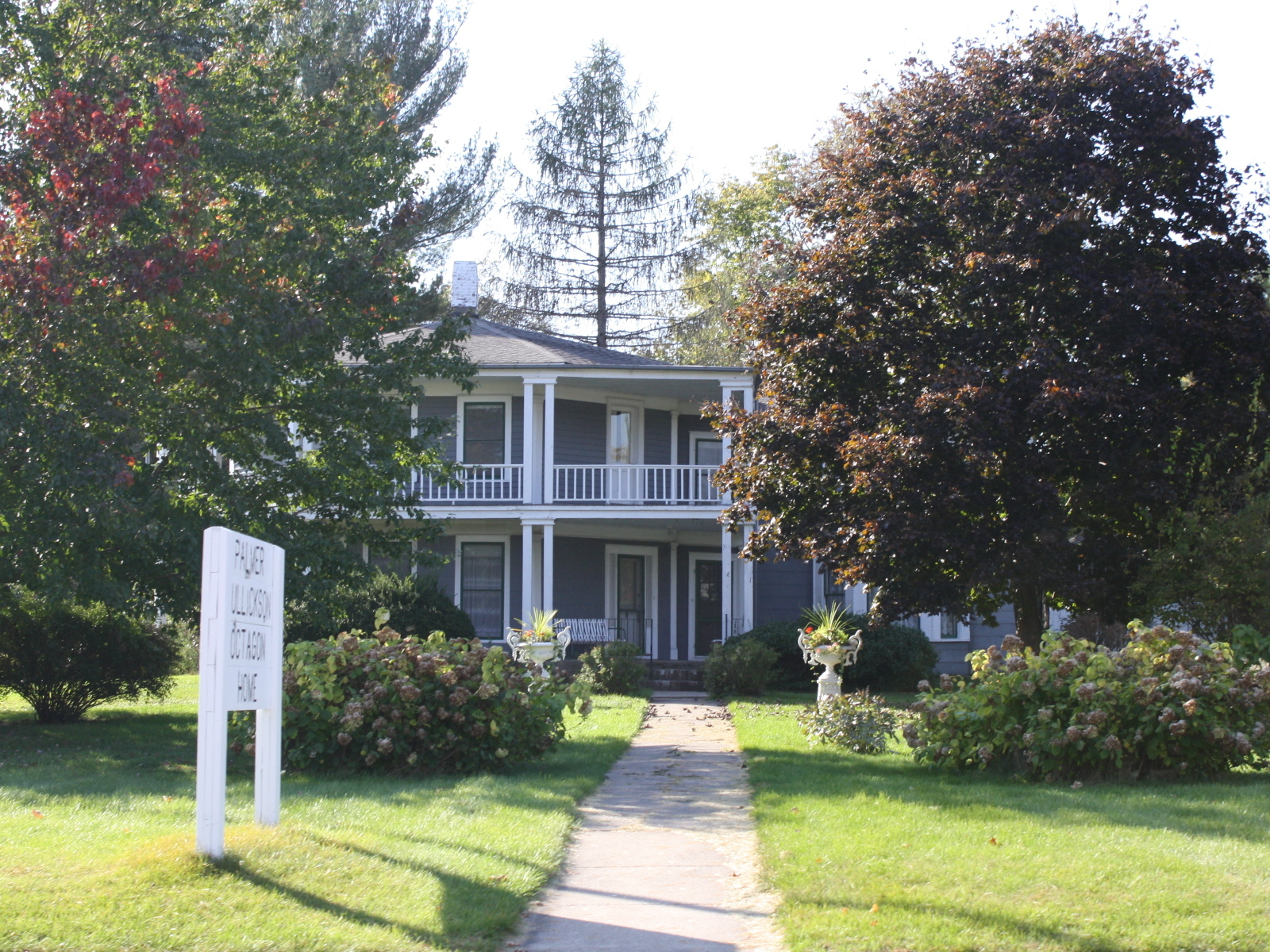
Palmer-Gullickson Octagon

- The Hamlin Garland House
- The Palmer Brother's Octagons

== Parks and recreation ==
- Bike Depot Park
- Caryn Modawell Memorial Dog Park
- Corral Park
- Greene Park
- Jim Zanter Park
- Lewis Point Park
- Neshonoc South Park and Boat Landing (La Crosse County)
- Neshonoc-Swarthout Park (La Crosse County)
- Pineview Park
- Riverview Park
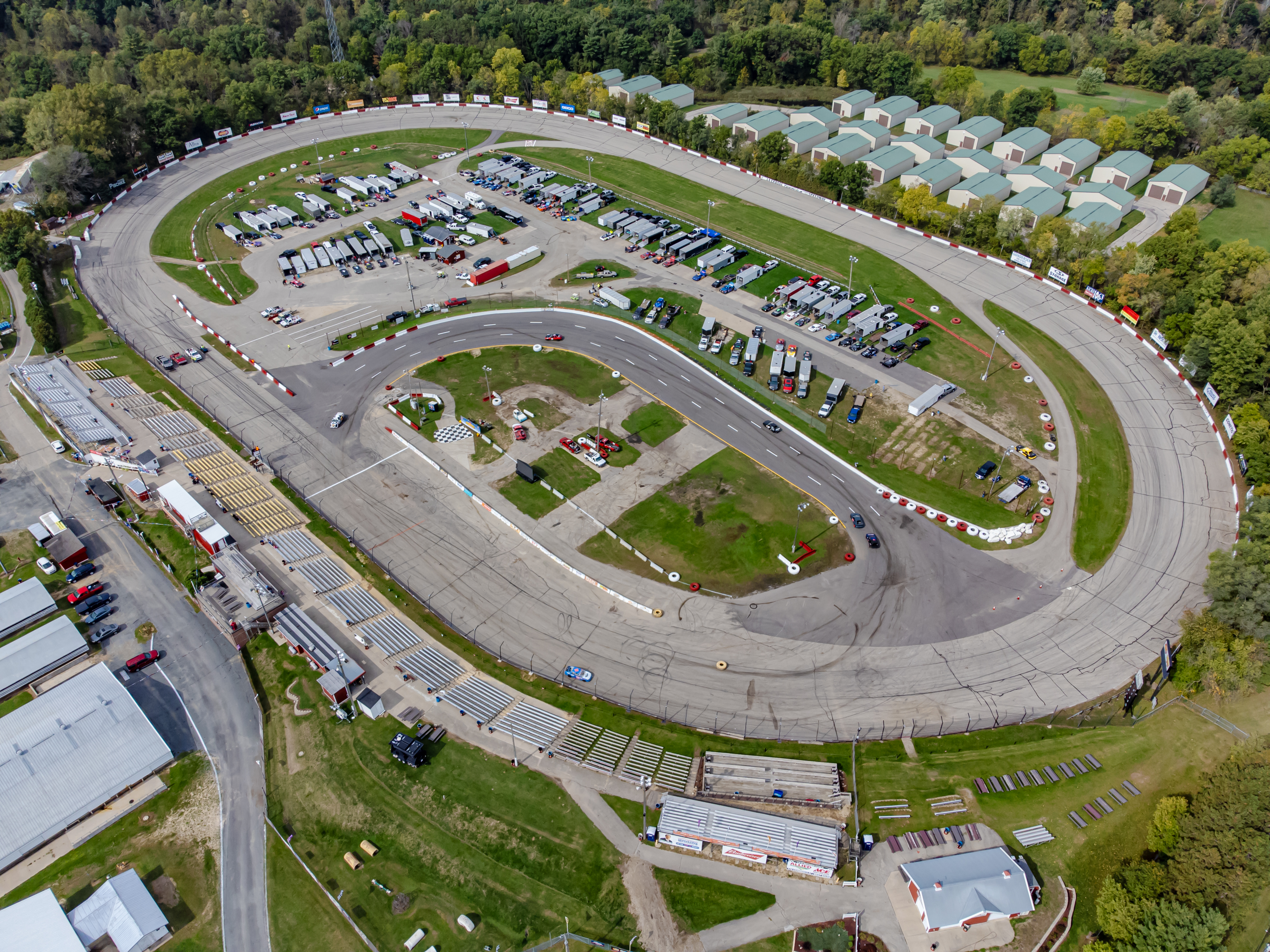
  La Crosse Fairgrounds Speedway
- Swarthout Pool
- Veterans Memorial Park and Campground (La Crosse County)
- Village Park
- Lake Neshonoc
- La Crosse Fairgrounds Speedway (La Crosse County)

== Notable people ==
- Charles S. Benton, U.S. Representative from New York
- Tom Black, NBA player, graduated from high school in West Salem.
- George G. Bingham, Oregon jurist
- Frank P. Coburn, United States House of Representatives
- Hamlin Garland, writer - West Salem was his summer house, but he was born here.
- Harry W. Griswold, United States House of Representatives
- Jay L. Johnson, United States admiral
- Mabel Johnson Leland, lecturer, translator
- Damian Miller, major league baseball player
- William F. Miller, Wisconsin legislator
- Norbert Nuttelman, Wisconsin legislator and farmer
- Arthur H. Parmelee, football coach and physician
