= Main-Travelled Roads =

Short story collection by Hamlin Garland

- Main-Travelled Roads (first edition)
- Author: Hamlin Garland
- Language: English
- Publisher: Arena Publishing Company
- Publication date: 1891
- Publication place: United States
- Media type: Print (hardback & paperback)
- Pages: 260 pages (first edition, hardback)
- ISBN: 0803270585

Main-Travelled Roads is a collection of short stories by the American author Hamlin Garland. First published in 1891, the stories are set in what the author refers to as the "Middle Border," the northwestern prairie states of Wisconsin, Nebraska, Iowa, Minnesota and South Dakota. In the book's eleven stories, Garland portrays the hardships of agrarian life, deconstructing the conventional myth of the American prairie while highlighting the economic and social conditions that characterized agricultural communities in the rural Midwest.

== Summary ==
Main-Travelled Roads contains eleven semi-autobiographical short stories, including "A Branch Road", "Up the Coolly", "Among the Corn-Rows", "The Return of a Private", "Under the Lion's Paw", "The Creamery Man", "A Day's Pleasure", "Mrs. Ripley's Trip", "Uncle Ethan Ripley", "God's Ravens", and "A 'Good Fellow's' Wife". The tales inflect human drama into the harsh, spirit-crushing conditions Garland experienced as a boy, vividly portraying the "overwhelming forces in nature and social injustices" that mark rural existence. Garland's book dedication is a story in itself: "To my father and mother, whose half-century pilgrimage on the main travelled road of life has brought them only toil and deprivation, this book of stories is dedicated by a son to whom every day brings a deepening sense of his parents' silent heroism". As foreshadowed by the dedication, Garland's stories paint an unforgiving portrait of Midwestern farm life: unrelenting physical toil, harsh living conditions, widespread poverty and an overwhelming sense of hopelessness.

In his introduction to Main-Travelled Roads, scholar Joseph B. McCullough recognizes Garland as one of the 19th century's most influential voices concerning the challenges of post Civil War agrarian society, especially the inequities of the tax system and the struggle for women's rights.

== Contents ==
- "A Branch Road" - lost and found love between a young farmer and the girl he left behind.
- "Up the Coolly" - an affluent New York City actor's mixed feelings of guilt and affection while visiting his family's Wisconsin farm.
- "Among the Corn-Rows" - an eager young homesteader's wooing of a Norwegian girl.
- "The Return of a Private" - the bittersweet homecoming of a wounded army private.
- "Under the Lion's Paw" - a hard-working farmer is victimized by a greedy landlord.
- "The Creamery Man" - a peddler's affections are thwarted by local gossip.
- "A Day's Pleasure" - a downtrodden farm wife's visit to town is made special by an invitation into a person's home.
- "Mrs. Ripley's Trip" - after twenty-three years away, an elderly farm wife longs to visit her childhood home.
- "Uncle Ethan Ripley" - a farmer trades signage space on his barn for "medicinal bitters," creating friction between him and his wife.
- "God's Ravens" - a family's initial prejudice towards their less cultured neighbors dissipates after being shown great kindness.
- "A 'Good Fellow's' Wife" - after losing his depositors' money, a banker finds redemption by owning up to his mistakes and working with his clever wife to repay their debts.

== Publishing history and response ==
Benjamin Orange Flower, editor of the Boston-based progressive journal Arena, encouraged Garland to use his writing to inform the public about social and ethical issues. Garland's aim was to "write against the grain of the conventional depiction of rural life and to express his land policy and feminist ideas". Flower's Arena Publishing Company first published the book in June 1891 as Main-Travelled Roads: Six Mississippi Valley Stories, of which one selection had appeared in Arena, three others had been previously published in Harper's Weekly and two other pieces were new works. Garland added three more stories to the 1899 edition and another two in 1922, bringing the total from six to eleven.

Garland states that after publication of Main-Travelled Roads "the outcry... was instant and astonishing," though in truth, reviews were balanced. Garland's writing was universally praised for the "high quality of its description" and recognized as coming from a source that knew the material well; it was his de-romanticized realism that proved more problematic. In the Boston Herald, reviewer Louise Chandler Moulton wrote, "I have never before felt the desperate unspeakable pathos of the prairie farmer's struggle with life," before offering that the collection "was far too minutely and baldly real to please my own taste". Popular author William Dean Howells praises Garland's writing in the book's introduction for being "so robust and terribly serious… full of the bitter and burning dust… of the common avenues of life," describing Garland's collection as "a work of art, first of all, and we think of fine art". Such praise from a critic provided Garland with an ideal introduction to the reading public. The book was financially successful enough that Garland used his royalties to purchase a home in West Salem, Wisconsin.

In February 1892, The Atlantic Monthly said of Main Travelled Roads: "Whoever fares with Mr. Garland along his Main Travelled Roads is still no farther from the South than the Mississippi Valley, but the environment is unmistakably the West. The color, the light, the life, the movement, the readiness to turn from melancholy feeling to humorous perception, - all of these are gone, together with the ameliorating negro; and in their places, produced by a massive, crude force will have to be reckoned with in our literature, is one overwhelming impression of grinding, unremunerated toil".

While modern Garland scholar Keith Newlin acknowledges that "several of the stories of Main-Travelled Roads are marred by melodramatic and sentimental touches," he insists that the collection "as a whole is powerful and evocative and has an aesthetic effect far superior to that of any one story".

== Style ==
Garland described his style as "veritism". In Garland's words, the 'veritist' aims at "the truthful statement of an individual impression corrected by reference to the fact". In a 1939 letter to Ph.D. student Eldon Hill, Garland wrote, "In truth I was an impressionist in that I presented life and landscape as I personally perceived them but I sought a deeper significance in the use of the word, I added a word which subtended verification".
