= Hamlin Garland =

American writer, Georgist, and psychical researcher

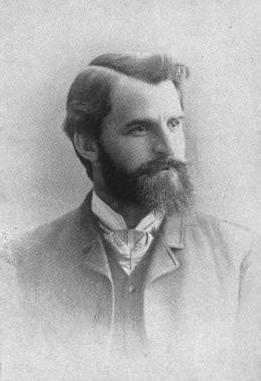
- Born: September 14, 1860; West Salem, Wisconsin, U.S.
- Died: March 4, 1940 (aged 79); Hollywood, California, U.S.
- Resting place: Neshonoc Cemetery; West Salem, Wisconsin
- Occupations: Novelist; poet; psychical researcher; writer
- Notable work: A Daughter of the Middle Border, Main-Travelled Roads, Jason Edwards: An Average Man, A Member of the Third House, Crumbling Idols
- Awards: Pulitzer Prize for Biography, 1922

Hannibal Hamlin Garland (September 14, 1860 – March 4, 1940) was an American novelist, poet, essayist, short story writer, Georgist, and psychical researcher. He is best known for his fiction involving hard-working Midwestern farmers.

== Biography ==
Hannibal Hamlin Garland was born on a farm near West Salem, Wisconsin, on September 14, 1860, the second of four children of Richard Garland of Maine and Charlotte Isabelle McClintock. The boy was named after Hannibal Hamlin, the vice-president under Abraham Lincoln. He lived on various Midwestern farms throughout his young life, but settled in Boston, Massachusetts, in 1884 to pursue a career in writing.

He read diligently in the Boston Public Library. There he became enamored with the ideas of Henry George, and his Single Tax Movement. George's ideas came to influence a number of his works, such as Main-Travelled Roads (1891), Prairie Folks (1892), and his novel Jason Edwards (1892).

Main-Travelled Roads was his first major success. It was a collection of short stories inspired by his days on the farm. He serialized a biography of Ulysses S. Grant in McClure's Magazine before publishing it as a book in 1898. The same year, Garland traveled to the Yukon to witness the Klondike Gold Rush, which inspired The Trail of the Gold Seekers (1899). He lived on a farm between Osage, and St. Ansgar, Iowa for quite some time. Many of his writings are based on this era of his life.

In 1893, Hamlin moved to Chicago, where he lived at 6427 South Greenwood Avenue in the Woodlawn neighborhood. He is considered "a significant figure in the Chicago Literary Movement" and "one of Chicago's most important authors". Moccasin Ranch Park, located near address, is named in his honor.

In Illinois, Garland married Zulime Taft, the sister of sculptor Lorado Taft, and began working as a teacher and a lecturer.

A prolific writer, Garland continued to publish novels, short fiction, and essays. In 1917, he published his autobiography, A Son of the Middle Border. The book's success prompted a sequel, A Daughter of the Middle Border, for which Garland won the 1922 Pulitzer Prize for Biography. After two more volumes, Garland began a second series of memoirs based on his diary. Garland became quite well known during his lifetime and had many friends in literary circles. He was made a member of the American Academy of Arts and Letters in 1918.

After moving to Hollywood, California, in 1929, he devoted his remaining years to investigating psychic phenomena, an enthusiasm he first undertook in 1891. In his final book, The Mystery of the Buried Crosses (1939), he tried to defend such phenomena and prove the legitimacy of psychic mediums.

A friend, Lee Shippey, columnist for the Los Angeles Times, recalled Garland's regular system of writing:

. . . he got up at half past five, brewed a pot of coffee and made toast on an electric gadget in his study and was at work by six. At nine o'clock he was through with work for the day. Then he breakfasted, read the morning paper and attended to his personal mail. . . . After luncheon he and Mrs. Garland would take a long drive . . . . Sometimes they would drop in on Will Rogers, Will Durant, Robert Benchley or even on me, for their range of friends was very wide. . . . After dinner they would go to a show if an exceptionally good one were in town, otherwise one of their daughters would read aloud.

Garland died at age 79, at his home in Hollywood on March 4, 1940. A memorial service was held three days later near his home in Glendale, California. His ashes were buried in Neshonoc Cemetery in West Salem, Wisconsin, on March 14; his poem "The Cry of the Age" was read by Reverend John B. Fritz.

The Hamlin Garland House in West Salem was designated as a National Historic Landmark in 1971.

== Works ==
- Main-Travelled Roads (1891)
- Jason Edwards: An Average Man (1892)
- A Member of the Third House (1892)
- A Little Norsk (1892)
- A Spoil of Office (1892)
- Prairie Folks (1893)
- Prairie Songs (1893)
- Crumbling Idols (1894)
- Rose of Dutcher's Coolly (1895)
- Wayside Courtships (1897)
- The Spirit of Sweetwater (1898)
- Ulysses S. Grant: His Life and Character (1898)
- Boy Life on the Prairie (1899)
- The Trail of the Gold Seekers (1899)
- The Eagle's Heart (1900)
- Her Mountain Lover (1901)
- Delmar of Pima (1902)
- The Captain of the Gray-Horse Troop (1902)
- Hesper (1903)
- The Light of the Star (1904)
- The Tyranny of the Dark (1905)
- Witch's Gold (1906)
- The Long Trail (1907)
- Money Magic (1907)
- The Shadow World (1908)
- The Moccasin Ranch (1909)
- Cavanagh, Forest Ranger (1910)
- Other Main-Travelled Roads (1910)
- Victor Ollnee's Discipline (1911)
- The Forester's Daughter (1914)
- They of the High Trails (1916)
- A Pioneer Mother (1922)
- The Book of the American Indian (1923)
- The Westward March of American Settlement (1927)
- Prairie Song and Western Story (1928)
- Iowa, O Iowa (1935)
- Joys of the Trail (1935)
- Forty Years of Psychic Research (1936)
- The Mystery of the Buried Crosses (1939)

=== Middle Border series ===
- A Son of the Middle Border (1917)
- A Daughter of the Middle Border (1921) (1922 Pulitzer Prize for Biography or Autobiography)
- Trail-Makers of the Middle Border (1926)
- Back-Trailers from the Middle Border (1928)

=== Memoirs ===
- Roadside Meetings (1930)
- Companions on the Trail (1931)
- My Friendly Contemporaries (1932)
- Afternoon Neighbors (1934)
