= Hundredth monkey effect =

Claim that new ideas spread without communication

The hundredth monkey effect is an esoteric idea claiming that a new behavior or idea is spread rapidly by unexplained means from one group to all related groups once a critical number of members of one group exhibit the new behavior or acknowledge the new idea. The behavior was said to propagate even to groups that are physically separated and have no apparent means of communicating with each other.

Since it was first popularized, the effect has been discredited in many cases of research. One of the primary factors in the spread of this claim is that many authors quote secondary, tertiary, or post-tertiary sources that have themselves misrepresented the original observations.

== History ==
The "hundredth monkey" effect was popularized in the mid-to-late 1970s by Lyall Watson, who documented the findings of several Japanese primatologists from the 1950s.

=== Watson (1970s) ===
Between 1952 and 1953, (Note: Lawrence Blair, unlike Watson, does not assign the date 1952 to the observations.) primatologists conducted a behavioral study of a troop of Macaca fuscata (Japanese macaque or snow monkeys) on the island of Kōjima. The researchers would supply these troops with such foods as sweet potatoes and wheat in open areas, often on beaches. An unanticipated byproduct of the study was that the scientists witnessed several innovative evolutionary behavioral changes by the troop, two of which were orchestrated by one young female, and the others by her sibling or contemporaries. The account of only one of these behavioral changes spread into a phenomenon (i.e., the "hundredth monkey effect"), which Watson would then loosely publish as a story.

According to Watson, the scientists observed that some of the monkeys learned to wash sweet potatoes. Initially, an 18-month-old female member (named "Imo" in 1953 by the researchers, imo being the Japanese for "sweet potato") discovered she could remove the sand from her sweet potato by washing it in a stream or the ocean. Imo taught her mother. Imo also taught some other young macaques of a similar age to Imo, who in turn taught their mothers. Gradually, this new potato-washing habit spread through the troop—in the usual fashion, through observation and repetition. (Unlike most food customs, this behavior was learned by the older generation of monkeys from younger ones.)

This behavior spread up until 1958, according to Watson, when a sort of group consciousness had suddenly developed among the monkeys, as a result of one last monkey learning potato washing by conventional means (rather than the one-monkey-at-a-time method prior). Watson concluded that the researchers observed that, once a critical number of monkeys was reached—i.e., the hundredth monkey—this previously learned behavior instantly spread across the water to monkeys on nearby islands.

Watson first published the story in a foreword to Lawrence Blair's Rhythms of Vision (1975); the story then spread with the appearance of Watson's 1979 book Lifetide: The Biology of the Unconscious.

==== Original research (1950s) ====
The original Koshima research was undertaken by a team of scientists as a secondary consequence of 1948 research on semi-wild monkeys in Japan. The Koshima troop was isolated from other troupes on nearby islands. From 1950, it was used as a closed study group to observe wild Japanese macaque behavior. While studying the group, the team would drop sweet potatoes and wheat on the beach and observe the troop's behavior. In 1954, a paper was published indicating the first observances of one monkey, Imo, washing her sweet potatoes in the water.

Her changed behavior led to several feeding behavior changes over the course of the next few years, all of which was of great benefit in understanding the process of teaching and learning in animal behavior. A brief account of the behavioral changes can be seen below:

1. The young first teach their contemporaries and immediate family, who all benefit from the new behavior and teach it to their contemporaries.
2. If the parents or their contemporaries (or their parents) are too old, they do not adopt the behavior.
3. Once the initial group have children, a change occurs in the dynamic of the behavior from teaching previous and current generations, to a new dynamic where the next generation learns by observation. The behavior is no longer actively taught but passively observed and mimicked.
4. The first innovator continues to innovate. The young monkey who started potato washing also learned how to sift wheat grains out of the sand by throwing handfuls of sand and wheat into the water, then catching the wheat that floated to the top. This invention was also copied using the above teaching and learning process until there were too many monkeys on the island with too little wheat apportioned, which is when competition became too fierce and the stronger monkeys would steal the collected wheat from the weaker ones, so they stopped the learned behavior in self-preservation.
5. The innovator's sibling started another innovation whereas the monkeys were initially fearful of the ocean, only deigning to put their hands and feet into it, the wheat straining innovation led to monkeys submerging more of their bodies in the water, or play-splashing in the ocean. This behavior was again copied using the above teaching and learning processes.

The study does not indicate a catalyst ratio at which all the Koshima monkeys started washing sweet potatoes, or a correlation to other monkey studies where similar behavior started. To the contrary, it indicated that certain age groups in Koshima would not learn the behavior.

=== Keyes (1984) ===
This story was further popularized by Ken Keyes Jr. with the publication of his book The Hundredth Monkey (1984). Keyes's book was about the devastating effects of nuclear war on the planet. Keyes presented the "hundredth monkey effect" story as an inspirational parable, applying it to human society and the effecting of positive change. Unfortunately, Keyes combined two items of truth: that the Koshima monkeys learned to wash sweet potatoes, and that the phenomenon was observed on neighboring islands. He did not provide substantiating evidence for his claims, diluting the importance of both studies and potentially discrediting the scientists involved. Combining this science with his political views may also have damaged the research credibility, leading to many reporters attempting to "debunk" the Japanese team's research without doing sufficient research themselves.

== Later research and criticism ==
In many cases of research since it was first popularized, the effect has been discredited. One of the primary factors in the spread of this concept is that many authors quote secondary, tertiary, or post-tertiary sources that have themselves misrepresented the original observations.

Separate papers make mention that, from 1960 onward, similar sweet potato-washing behaviors were noticed in other parts of the world; however, this is not directly attributed to Koshima. Claims are made that a monkey swam from one island to another where he taught the resident monkeys how to wash sweet potatoes. No mention of the other behavioral improvements are made and no indication of how the monkey swam—the Koshima monkeys cannot swim. Therefore, although the question must be asked how the swimming monkey learned the sweet potato washing behavior if not from Koshima, no indication is made as to where the monkey learned the behavior.

In 1985, Elaine Myers re-examined the original published research in an article for the journal In Context. In her review, she found that the original research reports by the Japan Monkey Centre in the 2nd, 5th, and 6th volumes of Primates were insufficient to support Watson's story. In short, she is suspicious of the existence of a "hundredth monkey" phenomenon; the published articles describe how the sweet potato-washing behavior gradually spread through the monkey troop and became part of the set of learned behaviors of young monkeys, but Myers does not agree that it serves as evidence for the existence of a critical number at which the idea suddenly spread to other islands.

The story as told by Watson and Keyes is popular among New Age authors and personal-growth gurus, as well as becoming an urban legend and part of New Age mythology. Rupert Sheldrake has stated that a phenomenon like the hundredth monkey effect would be evidence of morphic fields bringing about non-local effects in consciousness and learning. As a result, the story has also become a favorite target of the Committee for the Scientific Investigation of Claims of the Paranormal, and was used as the title essay in The Hundredth Monkey and Other Paradigms of the Paranormal, published by the Committee in 1990.

In his book Why People Believe Weird Things (1997), Michael Shermer explains how the urban legend started, was popularized, and has since been discredited.

The original research continues to prove useful in the study of cultural transmission in animals.

Ron Amundson's analysis of the pertinent literature, published by the Skeptics Society, revealed several key points that demystified the supposed effect. Claims that the practice spread suddenly to other isolated populations of monkeys may be called into question given the fact that the monkeys had the researchers in common. Amundson also notes that the sweet potato was not available to the monkeys prior to human intervention. Moreover, the number of monkeys in the colony was counted as 59 in 1962, indicating that even in numbers no "hundredth monkey" existed.

Unsubstantiated claims that there was a sudden and remarkable increase in the proportion of washers in the first population were exaggerations of a much slower, more mundane effect. Rather than all monkeys mysteriously learning the skill, it was noted that it was predominantly a learned skill, which is widespread in the animal kingdom; older monkeys who did not know how to wash tended not to learn. As the older monkeys died and younger monkeys were born the proportion of washers naturally increased. The time span between observations by the Japanese scientists was on the order of years so the increase in the proportion was not observed to be sudden.

== In environmental activism ==
During a 1993 conversation between Dave Foreman, one of the founders of Earth First!, and board members and staff of the Wildlands Project in the United States, Earth First! executive director David Johns noted that some Earth First! members had been showing up to protests wearing buttons that said "no them," meaning that there was no "us versus them." The buttons reflected the belief that those who opposed environmental activism were not enemies but simply misguided and that their belief system would pass away in favor of more enlightened beliefs through the hundredth monkey effect.

The hundredth monkey effect is said to provide relief from pessimism about the state of the planet. John Seed, an Australian deep ecology activist and itinerant Council of All Beings missionary, also mentioned the “one percent effect” (a version of the hundredth monkey effect popularized through Transcendental Meditation) during an interview on 5 November 1992 in Osceola, Wisconsin. He cited a belief that the environmental crisis was so grave that only a miracle caused by massive spiritual-consciousness transformation could prevent a mass extinction. The hundredth monkey effect validates that belief in mass consciousness for some. Bron Taylor notes that stories such as that of the hundredth monkey effect "are resilient within the environmental countercultures because they cohere with the personal spiritual experiences of connection and extra-ordinary communication that many of these activists have had with nature’s various energies and life forms." Feelings and experiences of being connected to all beings or to plants, who cannot communicate in ways commonly recognized by humans, lead some to believe in the hundredth monkey effect.

== See also ==
- Confirmation bias
- Decline effect
- Infinite monkey theorem
- Meme
- Multiple discovery
- Tipping point (sociology)
