= I Gusti Nyoman Lempad =

Indonesian artist

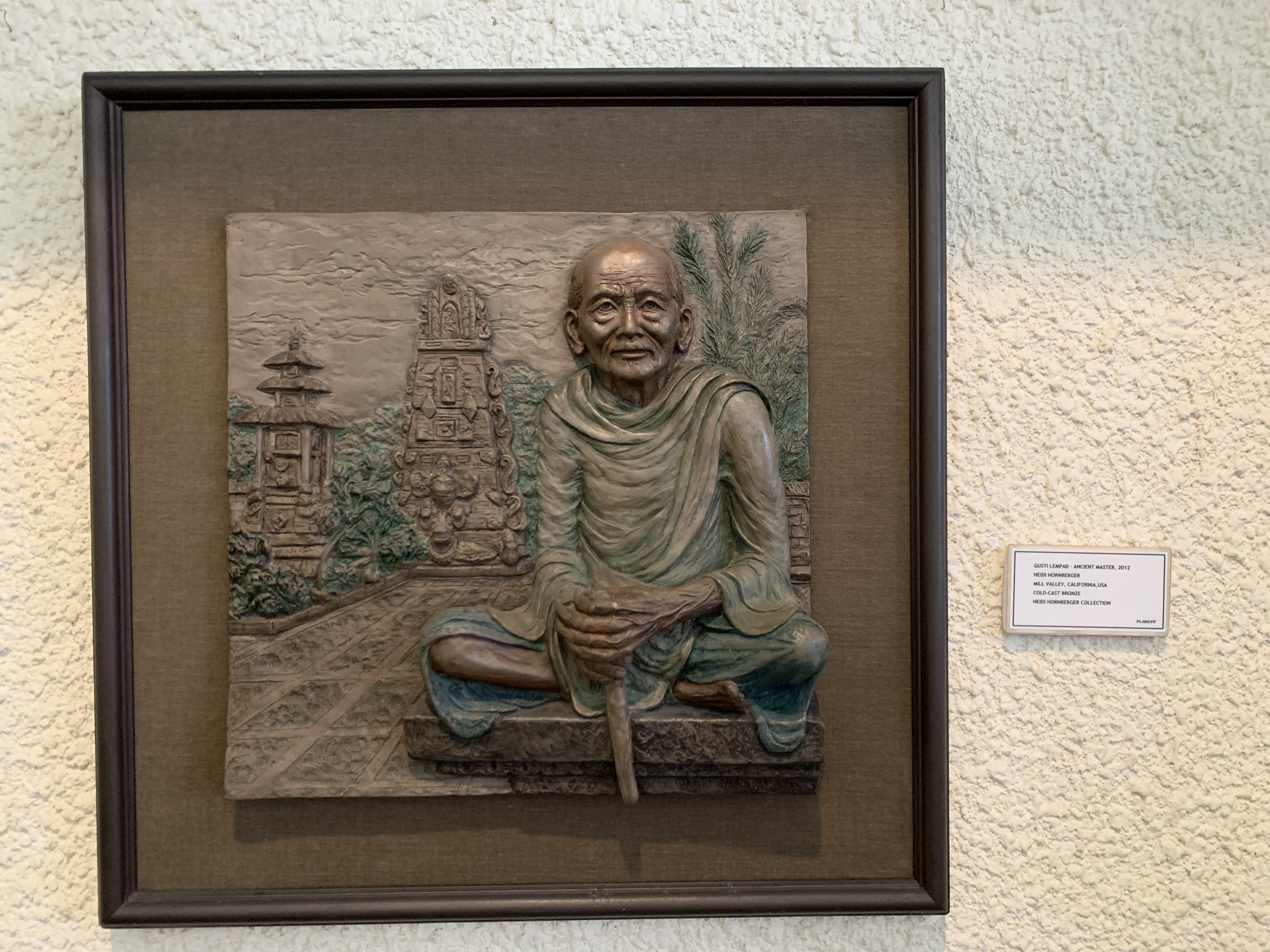
- Brass relieve depicting Lempad "the Ancient Master" in Puri Lukisan Museum, Ubud
- Born: 1862
- Died: 25 April 1978 (aged 115–116); Ubud, Gianyar, Bali, Indonesia

I Gusti Nyoman Lempad (1862?–1978) was a Balinese stone sculptor, architect (undagi in Balinese) and painter who built palaces and temples in Ubud and its neighboring villages.

== Biography ==
Lempad's exact birth date, as is the case for many Balinese of his time, is unknown. But he was married when Krakatoa erupted in 1883. Lempad grew up under the creative guidance of his artist father. From early in his life, he was acknowledged as an outstanding stone carver and architect. His Saraswati water temple, standing not far from the Puri Lukisan Museum in Ubud, demonstrates his architectural and design skills. In his later years, he produced hundreds of linear drawings of Balinese mythology and folklore. Lempad of Bali, a short documentary film produced by John Darling and Lorne Blair, tells the story of Lempad at the end of his life and his cremation ceremony.

== Death ==
He died on April 25, 1978, at his home in Ubud. He gathered his family and asked them to bathe him and then died. The Balinese believed that he chose the time of his death at the day that considered most holy.

== See also ==
- Amrizal Salayan
