= Lawrence Blair =

Anthropologist, author, explorer and filmmaker

- Born: Surrey, England
- Education: Lancaster University
- Occupations: Anthropologist; author; explorer; film maker
- Years active: 1972–present
- Known for: Ring of Fire: An Indonesian Odyssey
- Website: drlawrenceblair.com

Lawrence Blair is an English anthropologist, author, explorer and filmmaker. He is the writer, presenter and co-producer of the TV series Ring of Fire, an Emmy award nominee and winner of the 1989 National Educational Film and Video Festival Silver Apple awards. Born in England, he has been a resident of Bali, Indonesia for the past 35 years.

== Life and career ==
Lawrence Blair emigrated from England to Mexico with his parents and his brother Lorne in his early years. He has been a diver in Mexico and Indonesia, a fisherman in Alaska, an actor, a model, a photographer and an interpreter. He earned his PhD at Lancaster University, England with a doctoral thesis exploring and defining the field of psycho-anthropology.

He wrote the book Rhythms of Vision: The Changing Patterns of Belief in 1976 in which he discussed sacred geometry, subtle energy, chakras, spiritual planes of existence and many other topics, the book has been compared to the work of the occultist Corinne Heline and the theosophist Alice Bailey. The book is most well known for first discussing the Hundredth monkey effect. Lyall Watson was a friend of Blair's and wrote a foreword for the book.

Blair starred in the documentary Ring of Fire which discussed the varieties of volcanism and earthquake activity around the Pacific Rim.

He wrote, co-produced and starred in the five film series documentary called Ring of Fire: An Indonesian Odyssey which highlights a 10-year exploration of Indonesian Islands, an adventure of Lawrence and his brother Lorne. The series was later developed into a book of the same name.

Lawrence Blair went on to write and host Myth, Magic and Monsters a four-Part documentary series, in which he explores the Indonesian archipelago for rare and mysterious creatures, which include reptiles, ocean dwellers and domesticated animals. According to Blair: “There are still undiscovered species and tribes of people out there.”

In 2009, Blair appeared in the documentary film Oh My God in which people around the world were asked the question – "What is God?", Blair answered that God is not a belief and that "Thought is the enemy of the awareness of the presence of god."

== Bibliography ==
- Rhythms of Vision: The Changing Patterns of Belief (1976) ISBN 978-0-8052-3610-1
- Ring of Fire: An Indonesia Odyssey (2010) ISBN 981-4260-10-X

== Filmography ==
- Ring of Fire: An Indonesian Odyssey (1988 series of five documentary films)
- Ring of Fire (1991 documentary film)
- Myth, Magic and Monsters (2006 four-part documentary film series)
- Oh My God (2009 documentary film)
- Bali - Island of the Dogs (2010)
