= That's Love =

That's Love may refer to:

- That's Love (TV series), a British television sitcom
- "That's Love" (Jim Capaldi song), 1983
- "That's Love" (Billy Fury song), 1960

== See also ==
- "That's Love, That It Is", a song by Blancmange
