= Fierce Heart =

Studio album by Jim Capaldi
- Released: 1983
- Recorded: 1983
- Studio: Netherturkdonic Studios, Gloucestershire, England; Jam Recording Ltd., London; Regents Park Studios, London; Wessex Studios, London; Matrix Studios, London
- Genre: Pop rock, synthpop
- Length: 36:06
- Label: WEA
- Producer: Steve Winwood, Jim Capaldi

Jim Capaldi chronology
Let the Thunder Cry (1981)	Fierce Heart (1983)	One Man Mission (1984)

Singles from Fierce Heart
- 1. "That's Love" Released: April 1983; 2. "Living on the Edge" Released: July 1983; 3. "Tonight You're Mine" Released: September 1983

Professional ratings
Review scores
Source	Rating
Allmusic	3/5 stars

Fierce Heart is the eighth solo album by British musician Jim Capaldi. The album has a far more synth-heavy approach than any of his previous albums, though the songs are mostly in the same aggressive rock/pop vein that Capaldi had long been associated with. This synth-heavy pop sound was exactly what 1980s audiences were looking for, and the songs "That's Love" which broke the top 40 in the US at number 28, and "Living on the Edge" at number 75, became hit singles. The album itself reached number 91 on the Billboard 200.

Capaldi was not as fond of Fierce Heart as his other works, and as little as five years after its release he was publicly professing that he thought it fell too much into the adult contemporary vein.

The album is dedicated to the memory of Rebop Kwaku Baah, Jim Capaldi's former bandmate in Traffic, who died in January of the year the album was released.

== Background ==
As with Capaldi's two previous albums, The Sweet Smell of... Success and Let the Thunder Cry, a significant portion of Fierce Heart drew inspiration from his new second home, Brazil. At least three of the songs ("Tonight You're Mine", "Back at My Place", and "That's Love") were mostly composed in Brazil and finished in England, and "Don't Let Them Control You" is actually a cover of a Brazilian song originally recorded by Sandra Ca, with new lyrics by Capaldi. In addition, the lyrics to "Gifts of Unknown Things" were inspired by the book of the same name, which in Capaldi's words "deals with the mysteries of life in Brazil".

The minor hit "Living on the Edge" was written while on tour in Germany, with a lyric based on the Nagual Don Juan.

"I'll Always be Your Fool" dates back to Capaldi's time with Traffic. He says that the original idea for the song was "laid down with rhythm box and piano in 1972".

== Recording ==
Capaldi and Steve Winwood had maintained a working partnership since Traffic's dissolution; Winwood played on at least one track on all of Capaldi's albums save Electric Nights. With Fierce Heart, Capaldi enlisted his old partner as a major collaborator. Winwood co-produced the album with Capaldi, co-engineered it, played on every track (including solos on four of the tracks), and even arranged three of the songs: "Back at my Place", "Don't Let Them Control You", and the hit single "Living on the Edge". In a press release, Capaldi claimed that Winwood also co-wrote the music to "Living on the Edge", though the song is officially credited as solely written by Capaldi.

Fierce Heart was the first solo album by Jim Capaldi on which he played most of the drums himself. It was recorded at five different studios, with some of the songs containing tracks recorded at three different studios. Capaldi used two songs ("Runaway" and "Bad Breaks") from the 1982 album Runaway by the Dutch band Solution, for which he wrote most of the lyrics.

Most of the tracks were mixed to place emphasis on the synthesizers. Only "Runaway" was recorded without synthesizers, though "I'll Always be Your Fool" and "Gifts of Unknown Things" use them sparingly. Only three tracks use electric bass; the instrument is synthesized on the remaining tracks.

== Track listing ==
All lyrics written by Jim Capaldi. All music written by Jim Capaldi, except where noted.

1. "Tonight You're Mine" – 4:09
2. "Living on the Edge" – 4:40
3. "Bad Breaks" (music: Willem Ennes) – 3:06
4. "Runaway" (music: Solution) – 3:24
5. "Back at my Place" – 3:02
6. "That's Love" – 3:37
7. "I'll Always be Your Fool" – 3:48
8. "Don't Let Them Control You" (music: Macau (Note: Brazilian singer, real name Osvaldo Rui da Costa.)) – 5:10
9. "Gifts of Unknown Things" – 5:30 (Note: Incorrectly listed on label as 5:10.)

Bonus Track (Cassette)

1. "Low Spark of High Heeled Boys" – 4:41

== Personnel ==
=== Musicians ===
- Jim Capaldi – vocals, LinnDrum patterns, drums (1, 2, 5–8), percussion (3, 6, 7, 9), acoustic guitar (5), acoustic piano (7), glockenspiel (7)
- Steve Winwood – LinnDrum patterns, synthesizers (1–3, 5–8), electric guitar (1, 8), guitars (2), arrangements (2, 5, 8), guitar solo (3), backing vocals (3, 4, 6, 9), acoustic piano (4), organ (4), marimba (9)
- Chris Parren – keyboards (3), synthesizers (9)
- Van Morrison – acoustic guitar (1)
- Pete Bonas – guitars (3, 4), bass guitar (4), acoustic guitar (6), Ovation guitar (9)
- John Mizarolli – lead acoustic guitar (5)
- Brent Forbes – bass guitar (3)
- Jim Leverton – bass guitar (9)
- Bryson Graham – drums (3, 4, 9)
- Ray Otu Allen – congas (3, 7–9), percussion (7, 8)
- Mel Collins – saxophone (7), sax solo (8)
- Geoff Driscoll – saxophones (8)
- Martin Drover – trumpet (8)
- Nicole Winwood – backing vocals (6)
- Simon Bell – backing vocals (7)
- Stevie Lange – backing vocals (7)

=== Production ===
- Jim Capaldi – producer
- Steve Winwood – producer, engineer (1–4, 6, 8, 9)
- Nobby Clark – engineer (1–4, 6, 8, 9)
- Keith Fernley – engineer (1, 3–9)
- Mark Freegard – engineer (1, 3–9)
- Jon Walls – engineer (1, 3–9)
- Graham Watts – engineer (1, 3–9)
- Tom O'Leary – engineer (4)
- Phil Bodger – engineer (6)
- Dave Belotti – engineer (9)
- John Etchells – engineer (9)
- John Dent – mastering at The Sound Clinic (London, UK)
- Waring Abbott – photography
- Rocking Russian Design – design
