= Gifts of Unknown Things =

1976 book by Lyall Watson

- Author: Lyall Watson
- Published: 1976
- ISBN: 0-671-22632-0

Gifts of Unknown Things: A True Story of Nature, Healing, and Initiation from Indonesia's Dancing Island (1976, ISBN 0-671-22632-0) is a book by Lyall Watson. It recounts a true adventure; washed onto a remote island in Indonesia, he is greeted by local people who have a strong and mystic culture and a unique comprehension of colour, sound and movement.

Jim Capaldi's song "Gifts of Unknown Things", from his album Fierce Heart, was inspired by the book.
