= Ring of Fire (1991 documentary film) =

- DVD cover
- Directed by: George Casey
- Written by: Lawrence Blair; George Casey; David L. Hamilton; Sean MacLeod Phillips
- Produced by: George Casey; Paul Navros
- Narrated by: Robert Foxworth
- Edited by: Tim Huntley
- Music by: Michael Stearns
- Release date: 1991
- Running time: 40 minutes
- Countries: United States; Spain
- Language: English

Ring of Fire is a 1991 American documentary film in IMAX format. It looks at some of the varieties of volcanism and earthquake activity in the Ring of Fire, around the Pacific Rim. The film runs 40 minutes.

The film was jointly presented by the Fort Worth Museum of Science and History in Fort Worth, Texas, the Science Museum of Minnesota in Saint Paul, Minnesota, and the Reuben H. Fleet Space Theater and Science Center in San Diego, California.

The film has eight main segments, corresponding to chapters in the DVD release:

1. Ring of Fire: an overview of the region using wireframe computer animation, and including footage of Hawaiian lava flows as an illustration of how the early Earth might have looked. Footage of a new volcano in Chile is also shown.

2. The San Francisco Quake of '89: looks at the 1989 Loma Prieta earthquake in San Francisco, California and its aftermath, including IMAX footage of the rescheduled game of the 1989 World Series, ten days after the quake.

3. Mount St. Helens: includes IMAX footage from about 10 years after the 1980 eruption, and the famous time sequence of the eruption taken at the time.

4. Floating on Hot Liquid: looks at the geology of volcanism, again using wireframe computer animation to illustrate plate movement and magma flow up through the crust.

5. Learning to Live With a Volcano: life in Sakurajima, an island in Japan where eruptions are almost constant and evacuation drills are an annual event. sulfur mining at Kawah Ijen.

6. Buddhas Keep Watch: Using the temple of Borobudur and the Balinese Kecak dance as a frame, shows how Indonesians live with the simultaneous threat and fertility provided by their volcanoes.

7. The Center of the Ring: Looks at volcanism on Hawaii, especially Kilauea and Mauna Loa, Footage includes roads, houses and cars destroyed by advancing lava, and underwater lava flows.

8. End Credits

Ring of Fire was released as a VHS video in 1995, and as a DVD in 1997 (rereleased in 2006). It was released on Blu-ray on July 12, 2011, and is also available in HD from the iTunes Store.
