= Ring of Fire: An Indonesian Odyssey =

- Remastered DVD cover
- Genre: Documentary film
- Written by: Lawrence Blair
- Directed by: Lorne Blair
- Starring: John Chang
- Narrated by: Lorne Blair; Lawrence Blair
- Composer: Mason Daring
- Country of origin: United Kingdom
- Original language: English
- No. of episodes: 5(8)

Production
- Executive producers: David Fanning; Chris Blair; Robin Gurney
- Producers: Lorne Blair; Lawrence Blair
- Production location: Indonesia
- Running time: 56 minutes x 5
- Production companies: WGBH-TV; SavEarth Media LLC

Original release
- Network: PBS (US); BBC (UK)
- Release: 6 June – 18 July 1988

The Ring of Fire: An Indonesian Odyssey is a series of five documentary films following the decade-long Wanderjahr of the filmmaker/sibling partnership Lorne and Lawrence Blair.

== Background ==
With financing from investors including the BBC and Ringo Starr, the Blair Brothers arrived in Indonesia from England in 1972. At that time, the Indonesian archipelago offered isolation for Neolithic cultures and their indigenous beliefs. The Blair brothers spent over two decades documenting the relationships between island ecology and their peoples.

== Production ==
Originally edited from 80 hours of 16mm film in co-production with WGBH-TV, Boston, Ring of Fire was produced, directed and photographed by Lorne Blair and co-produced and written by Lawrence Blair. The executive producer was Frontline's David Fanning. The films have been shown in more than 60 countries. A 2021 digital remaster was produced by SavEarth Media, an impact media company.

== Series as five documentary films ==
No.	Title	Length (minutes)	Original release date
1	Spice Island Saga	58	1987
The Blair brothers follow the footsteps of naturalist Alfred Russel Wallace on a Bugis sailboat in search of the bird of paradise to the Aru Islands near New Guinea.
2	Dance of the Warriors	58	1987
The brothers sail to the islands of Komodo where they encounter the Komodo dragon, Sumba where they witness human sacrifice, western New Guinea where they meet the Asmat, and finally Bali where they build a home in a village.
3	East of Krakatoa	58	1987
The Blairs descend into the active volcano Anak Krakatoa and meet the legendary 116-year-old artist Lempad. They also meet the neigong master John Chang, known as “Dynamo Jack”, and witness the funeral rites of the king of the Toraja people of the Celebes.
4	Dream Wanderers of Borneo	61	1987
The brothers go in search of the nomadic Punan Dayaks.
5	Beyond the Ring of Fire	56	1996
Lawrence Blair returns to a lost paradise at the outer edge of the known world eight years later in a retrospective voyage to many of the islands first visited and others never previously filmed.

== Series as TV episodes ==
No.	Title	Length (minutes)	Original release date	Rerun Date
1	East with the Boogiemen	25	6 June 1988	13 August 1990
2	Spice Island Saga	25	13 June 1988	20 August 1990
3	Here Be Dragons	25	20 June 1988	3 September 1990
4	Dance of the Warriors	25	27 June 1988	10 September 1990
5	East of Krakatoa	25	4 July 1988	17 September 1990
6	Beyond the Shadow Screen	25	11 July 1988	24 September 1990
7	Dream Wanderers of Borneo	25	18 July 1988	10 October 1990
8	Beyond the Ring of Fire	-	1996	-

== Release ==
Ring of Fire aired in weekly installments from May 16, 1988, at 8 p.m. on Channels 28 and 15 as part of the PBS “Adventure” series.

One result of the work was a PBS-distributed multimedia package: an oversized picture book, alongside the Emmy-nominated BBC/PBS television series titled Ring of Fire. A book of the television series was published in 1988 and republished in 2010. A digitally remastered DVD was released in 2003. In 2021, in celebration of 50 years since filming began, Ring of Fire: An Indonesian Odyssey was digitally remastered (both picture and sound) and is now available on iTunes (US, UK, AUS and CAN) and Vimeo On Demand.

== Reception ==
In the Los Angeles Times, Steve Weinstein called the series an "incomparable adventure teeming with thrills, chills, mystery and the bizarre".

== Awards ==
- Emmy award in 1988.
- Silver Apple award in 1989 from the National Educational Film and Video Festival (NEFVF).
