= Amrizal Salayan =

Indonesian artist and sculptor

Amrizal Salayan (born October 8, 1958) is an Indonesian artist and sculptor.

== Biography ==
Amrizal Salayan was born in Bukittinggi, West Sumatra, on October 8, 1958. He studied fine arts at the Padang Teachers Training and Education Institute in West Sumatra from 1979 to 1980. Subsequently, he pursued his education at the Bandung Institute of Technology (ITB), where he enrolled in the Faculty of Fine Arts in 1984. In 1988, he successfully obtained his Bachelor of Fine Arts (BFA) degree from ITB. Later, in 2004, he furthered his academic journey at the same institute, attaining a master's degree.

== Notable works ==
- There He is with His Absence
- Banana Leaf Man
