= Lyall Watson =

South African biologist (1939–2008)

- Born: Malcolm Lyall-Watson; 12 April 1939; Johannesburg, Union of South Africa
- Died: 25 June 2008 (aged 69); Gympie, Queensland, Australia
- Education: Rondebosch Boys' High School; BSc (Hons) University of the Witwatersrand and University of Natal (now University of KwaZulu-Natal); PhD Westfield College, now merged with Queen Mary University of London
- Occupations: Zoologist, anthropologist, conservationist, writer
- Writing career
- Subjects: Completed his BSc (Hons) in the Department of Zoology at the University of Natal, awarded in 1960. PhD in ethology (the study of animal behaviour) awarded by London University in 1964, supervisor Desmond Morris
- Notable works: Supernature, The Romeo Error, Gifts of Unknown Things, Lifetide, Lightning Bird, Elephantoms

Lyall Watson (12 April 1939 – 25 June 2008) was a South African botanist, zoologist, biologist, anthropologist, ethologist, and author of many books, among the most popular of which is the best seller Supernature. Lyall Watson tried to make sense of natural and supernatural phenomena in biological terms. He is credited with coining the "hundredth monkey" effect in his 1979 book, Lifetide; later, in The Whole Earth Review, he conceded this was "a metaphor of my own making".

Born in Johannesburg in South Africa, full name Malcolm Lyall-Watson, he had an early fascination for nature in the surrounding bush and learned much from a Zulu minder, who taught him bushcraft and native African animism from an early age. Watson attended boarding school at Rondebosch Boys' High School in Cape Town from the age of ten, completing his studies in 1955. He enrolled at the University of the Witwatersrand at the age of 16 where, by the time he was 20, he had earned degrees from the University of the Witwatersrand and from the University of Natal (now the University of KwaZulu-Natal).

At the University of the Witwatersrand he had studied under Raymond Dart, leading on to postgraduate anthropological studies in Germany and the Netherlands. He completed a doctorate in ethology at the University of London, under Desmond Morris. He also worked at the BBC writing and producing nature documentaries, and for many years he spent seasons as an expedition leader and resident biologist on board the MS Lindblad Explorer, leading to the publication of a textbook for the general reader on Whales of the World in 1981. He was involved in setting up the Indian Ocean Whale Sanctuary, and in 1977 was appointed as the Seychelles Commissioner for Whales.

Watson wrote twenty-four books in all, during a writing career which spanned four decades.

== Life ==
=== Childhood (1939–55) ===
Born on 12 April 1939, in Johannesburg, South Africa, Watson, born Malcolm Lyall-Watson, was the eldest of three brothers. His father, Doug Lyall-Watson, was an architect who served abroad during World War II with the British Royal Air Force (RAF). Douglas Lyall-Watson was of Scottish ancestry, although five generations removed from his Scottish roots. Watson's mother Mary was of Dutch South African heritage, descended from Simon van der Stel, the first Dutch governor of the Cape.

Watson spent his memorable childhood on his maternal grandparents' ranch in a corner of the Transvaal that borders Mozambique and Swaziland, where his mother Mary helped to run the large farm for her aging parents. His grandmother Ouma, Afrikaans for "old ma", English name Grace, was interviewed by the authorities once for defacing postage stamps; she was accustomed to drawing devil's horns on the portrait of the statesman who instigated apartheid, before posting her letters. Watson was often placed in the care of an elderly Zulu, the son of a tribal chief, who taught the inquisitive boy bush craft, gave him the nickname Mbuzi, meaning "The Goat" because of his delight in sampling and exploring everything, and impressed him with the animistic ideas of African tribal culture.

When his father returned from the war, Watson was already attending a local school at a neighbouring farm. His father's subsequent, itinerant lifestyle as an architect, and his mother's profession as a radiologist, kept Watson on his grandparents' farm until the age of ten, when he was sent to a boarding school in Cape Town. It was during summer breaks from Rondebosch Boys' High School, spending a month unsupervised with a dozen other boys from his local district on a beach in Plettenberg Bay, in the southeast corner of the Western Cape, that Watson developed his thirst to explore, and learned the independence of thought that stayed with him all his life. Already, at the age of nine, on his grandparents' farm, his grandmother had taken him to the chief of a local tribal community who had been a life-long friend of hers, to be initiated into adulthood with all the other boys of the village. By the time he went to boarding school, he was fluent in Afrikaans, English and Zulu.

=== Higher education (1955–60) ===
At Rondebosch Boys' High School Watson's academic progress caused him to jump over a year and consequently he finished his studies a year early, at the age of fifteen. His father allowed him to travel before starting at university, and the fifteen-year-old indulged a growing passion for elephants by visiting the only two areas in the southern Cape still to have them. At the age of sixteen he began his studies at the University of the Witwatersrand, in Johannesburg, one of four English language universities in South Africa at the time.

He initially intended to study medicine, and one of his tutors was Raymond Dart, who taught anatomy at the university but had worked extensively gathering fragments of fossil hominids, being the first to describe the genus Australopithecus. Watson volunteered to help sort a large collection of donated fossils for Dart, and the two struck up a friendship that would last until Dart's death in 1988.

Watson came to realize that his interests lay in zoology and anthropology rather than in medicine, and he completed his BSc degree at the University of the Witwatersrand having taken courses in a wide range of subjects including botany, zoology, geology, geography and even psychology. He gained his BSc(Hons) in the Department of Zoology at the University of Natal, now the University of KwaZulu-Natal, in 1959, awarded in 1960.

=== Doctoral research (1960–1963) ===
By now Watson had developed a fascination with animal behaviour, and following his graduation at the University of Natal in South Africa he travelled to Germany to offer his services to the renowned ethologist Konrad Lorenz. But the fishes Lorentz set him to study did not satisfy Watson's interest in larger mammals, so he moved to Holland to study anthropology and from there to England and to Oxford, where the Dutch zoologist Niko Tinbergen, now a British citizen, headed a research team studying animal behaviour at Oxford University. Watson was offered a place there as a doctoral student on a project studying black-headed gulls, which did not fill him with much enthusiasm either. One of Tinbergen's former postgraduate students, Desmond Morris, had recently become Curator of Mammals at London Zoo, and it was arranged that Watson should became Morris's first PhD student.

Watson was awarded his PhD in 1964, from Westfield College, University of London, later merged with Queen Mary College to become Queen Mary University of London. The title of his thesis was 'The ethology of food-hoarding mammals - with special reference to the green acouchi, "Myoprocta pratti"' The green acouchi is a South American rodent found in the Amazon basin.

In order to support himself during his studies in London, Watson worked during the evenings in the kitchen of a large London hotel, rising to the grade of souffle chef. He met his first wife, Vivienne Mawson, when she interviewed him for a BBC Overseas Service radio programme on the activities of South African postgraduate students in London, and they were married in 1961. On the wedding cake was a sculpture of the Loch Ness monster. Shortly after gaining his doctorate, and given his experience at London Zoo and his association with Desmond Morris, he was offered the job of Director of Johannesburg Zoo in his native South Africa.

=== Johannesburg Zoo (1964–1965) ===
It was very soon after completing his PhD in London that Watson was offered the position of Director of the Johannesburg Zoo, an offer he found too good to refuse, despite his distaste for the apartheid system. He served as director there from 1964 to 1965. During this time, despite bureaucratic obstacles and financial constraints, he oversaw an expansion of the elephant house, introducing two companions for a long-time resident there, a female elephant named Delilah, as well as a new lion enclosure and a wooded area for the wolves. The 1960s was a time of general improvement at the zoo, introducing larger and more natural enclosures, the development of education and environmental programmes and involvement in local and international breeding programmes. Following completion of the new lion enclosure, however, as Watson describes in his 1982 BBC radio interview for Desert Island Discs, attempts by the local authorities to impose racial segregation on visitors to the new enclosures caused friction between himself and wider authorities leading to a number of interviews with the police and his ultimate resignation. He left South Africa and went to the Seychelles.

=== Tomorrow's World (1966–1967) ===
By the summer of 1966, Watson was in London again and he joined the production team on the BBC's tech television magazine programme Tomorrow's World, on the same day as its longstanding-co-presenter-to-be, James Burke. Watson, however, was only there for a year before moving on.

Watson's marriage to Vivienne ended in 1966. Around this time he shortened his name to Lyall Watson.

=== Seychelles and Indonesia (1967–1971 ) ===
Following his departure from the BBC, Watson's life goes off the radar for a while. But there are clues. He tried freelance film-making, shooting underwater archaeology in Greece and Turkey. He set up a consultancy business specializing in zoo design and nature conservation, which he named BioLogic of London. He was already known in the Seychelles and was later to help set up wildlife conservation areas in the region. There is mention of him organizing safari tours in Kenya. There is a story of him building a wooden house in Mosambique, even melting sand to make glass, but it was abandoned before completion. Watson confesses in a 1982 BBC radio interview that he needed long periods spent alone. He was also writing his first book, based on his studies of biology and ethology, called Omnivore: Our Evolution in the Eating Game, published in January 1971.

In the summer of 1970 Watson worked as an expedition leader and scientist-in-residence for a travel company owned by Lars-Eric Lindblad, on board the MS Lindblad Explorer, leading onshore expeditions and giving lectures on board. Lindblad ran a travel company based in the USA offering worldwide adventure holidays to exotic and hitherto unvisited places. He was a keen conservationist and in 1971 was actively seeking new locations for his small new cruise ship the Lindblad Explorer to visit. Watson was recruited by him in the summer of 1971 to scout out locations to visit in the Seychelles and in the islands of Indonesia, as a commercial venture but also to raise awareness of the vulnerability of these places. Watson was approached because: "Not only did he have a vast knowledge of biology, but he had lived for some time in the Seychelles and Indonesia, and knew the islands and islanders well."

In his Desert Island Discs radio broadcast for the BBC, Watson mentions an MSc in Marine Biology as one of his degrees. Given his gravitation at this time towards the sea, as illustrated by his 1981 textbook Whales of the World, the fruit of ten years study on the Lindblad Explorer and elsewhere, it is possible that one of the years 1967 to 1969 may have been spent studying for this degree.

=== Supernature and the Lindblad Explorer (1971–1974) ===
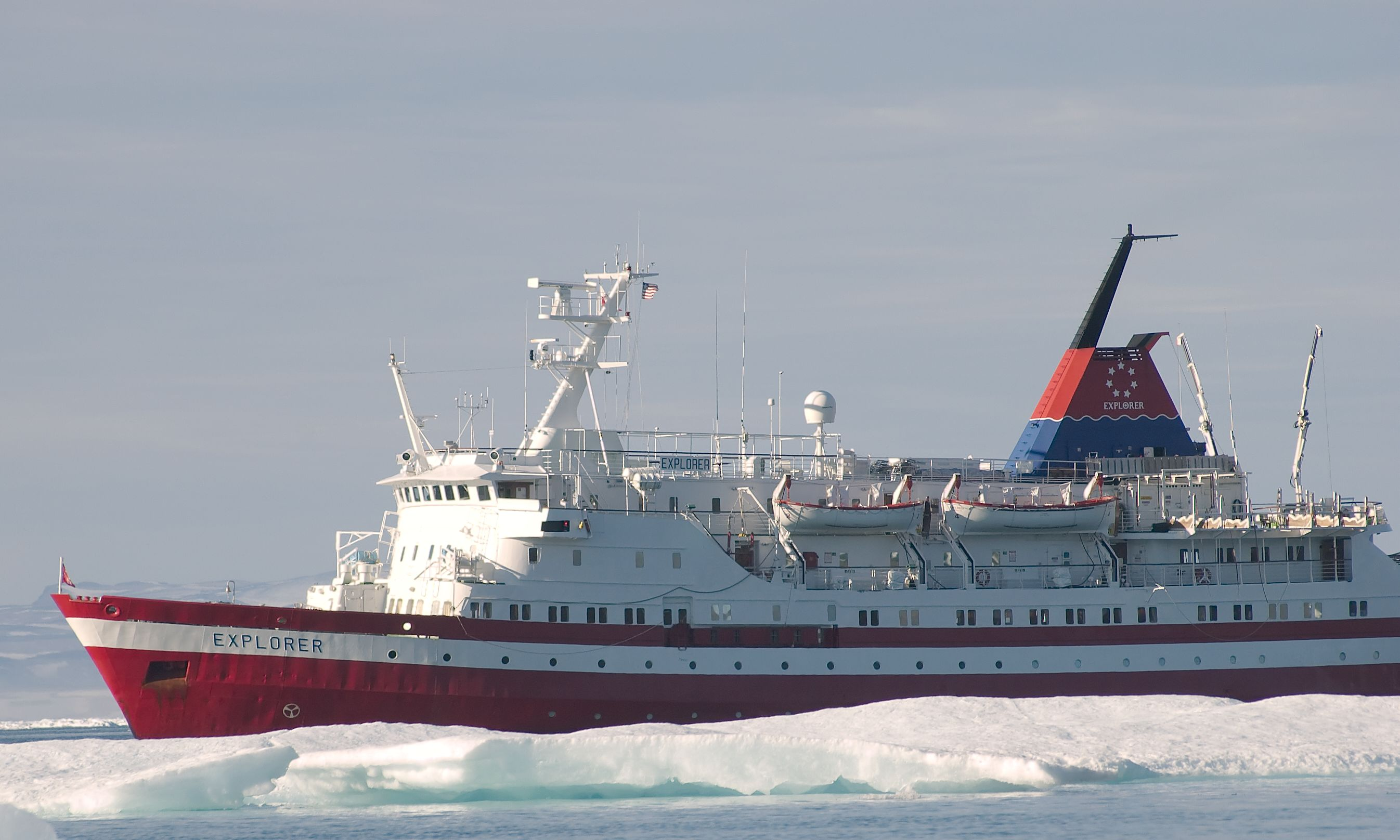
MS Lindblad Explorer was launched in 1969. By 2005, when this photograph was taken, outside Scoresbysund in Greenland, she had been renamed the MS Explorer.

Watson wrote his two most popular books, Supernature and The Romeo Error, between 1971 and 1974.

The cruise ship MS Lindblad Explorer first arrived at Mahé in the Seychelles on 19 April 1970 and for the next two years "carried out twenty-four cruises between Mombasa [Kenya] and the Seychelles, with the naturalists on board emphasizing the need for protection of the locations we visited." Having voyaged with her in 1970, Watson was recruited in 1971 to help in survey work to scout out suitable locations for the ship to visit in the Seychelles and in Indonesia.

This was following a sojourn in Greece. He arrived in the port of Kamares, on the Greek island of Siphnos, on 21 May 1971, wearing white trousers and carrying a canvas sea bag; he was there for a long-planned rendezvous at the Temple of Athenian Zeus on the midsummer solstice (21 June 1971). As it happened, the lady didn't show up. But the hippies he befriended, returning from their journeys to the east, prompted him to write a book exploring the interface between science and the paranormal that became Supernature. It took him three months to write. Failing to find a publisher for it, he eventually left it in London before travelling to the Philippines, intending to research spirit healers there, but perhaps also scouting for Lindblad, who was looking at this time to sail the Lindblad Explorer from Fiji to the Philippines, as well as to New Guinea. He spent over six months in the Philippines.

It is not exactly certain when this trip to the Philippines was, but in 1972, Watson was researching possible ports of call on the river Amazon with Lindblad, while the Explorer was in Norway undergoing repairs after a grounding in the Antarctic. She was due to sail for the Arctic in August, then for a cruise along the Amazon with passengers in the autumn before her next Antarctic foray in the southern summer. Watson subsequently served as expedition leader and naturalist on the autumn voyage along the Amazon during October and November, a round trip along this river totaling well over four thousand miles.

In December 1972, photographs record a family reunion with his parents. In 1973, he was again scouting Indonesia for interesting ports of call for the Explorer, and in particular the Asmat region of West Irian, on the island of New Guinea. The summer of 1973 marked the Explorer's first voyage from Bali to New Guinea, and Watson was on board as expedition leader and naturalist. He entertained the young people on board by demonstrating the kinds of faces that monkeys make to show emotions like fear, anger and happiness.

Watson returned to London in the autumn of 1973 to find that his book Supernature, written over two years earlier, had at last found a publisher. In November he used his connections with the British Broadcasting Company (BBC) to introduce Uri Geller to a British audience, and on 23 November 1973 Watson appeared with Geller on "The Dimbleby Talk-In" for the BBC, alongside host David Dimbleby and Professor John Taylor of King's College, London. Watson remained convinced of Geller's spoon-bending and telekinetic powers until at least 1976, where he discusses Geller's powers in his book Gifts of Unknown Things. Doubt has subsequently been cast upon Geller's talents being anything more than stage magic.

Watson was soon to spend nine months marooned in the Banda Sea before returning to London to discover that Supernature had sold tens of thousands of copies and was being translated into many languages. His second book, The Romeo Error, published in 1974, complemented Supernature by being an exploration of biological death, using an eclectic mix of biology and the paranormal in the same way that Supernature had been an exploration of biological life in the same vein and from the same standpoint. Given its publication in 1974, it is likely that The Romeo Error was written and submitted to publishers before his prolonged stay on the Indonesian island that he chose to call Nus Tarian when he wrote about this experience in his book Gifts of Unknown Things.

=== Gifts and Whales (1974–1981) ===
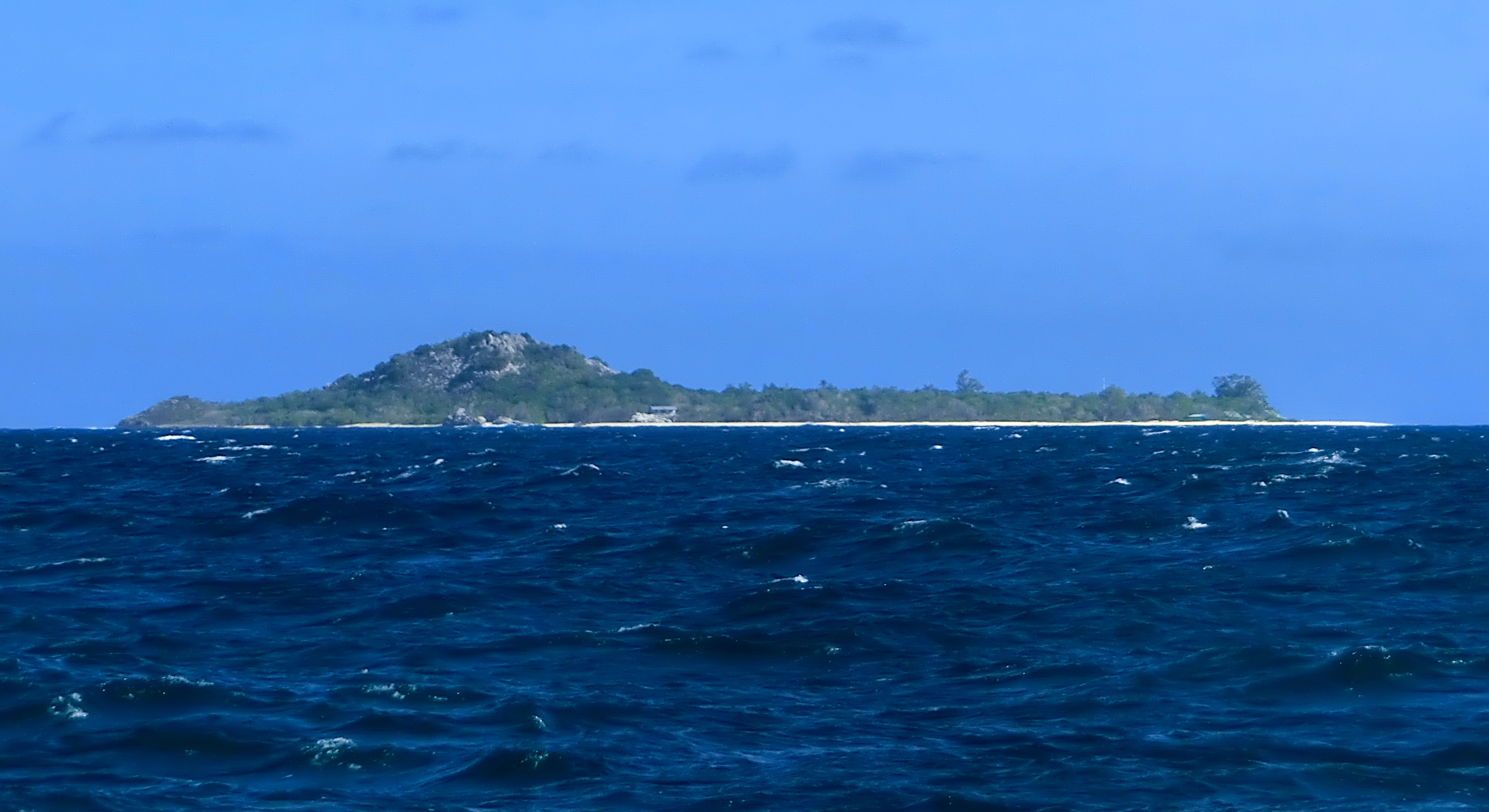
Cousin Island, in the Seychelles, has been the focus of wildlife conservation efforts since its Seychelles Warbler population first received protection in 1968.

1974. Publication of The Romeo Error.

1976. Publication of Gifts of Unknown Things.

Nine months on Nus Tarion, shipwrecked from a native dhow, possibly while scouting for Lindblad. Lindblad Explorer cruises to Indonesia continued successfully for years, continually finding new places to visit, sometimes "on islands whose inhabitants had never seen a large ship or a doctor before".

During this period Watson continued to work as an expedition leader to various locales, and he was the Seychelles commissioner for the International Whaling Commission in the late 1970s.

=== Japan and Ireland (1981–1991) ===
From at least 1985 until his death in 2008, Watson's permanent residence, if such a thing is possible for such a nomadic traveller, was a cottage in Ballydehob, County Cork, in Ireland.

In the mid-1980s, having earlier been approached by the American landscape photographer Jerry Derbyshire with an offer of collaboration, Watson appeared unannounced at Derbyshire's home in Austin, Texas, quickly rented a nearby apartment and spent six weeks writing the text for The Water Planet.

Watson signs his book Heaven's Breath: "Lyall Watson, Kyoto, Japan, 1983". In its final chapter he makes clear his familiarity and affinity with Japanese Shinto belief, which he regards as the last surviving refuge of a fully functioning animistic belief system, all others around the world having provided for anthropologists only fragments of a dying tradition. Watson's book Bali Entranced: A Celebration of Ritual was published in 1985, in Japanese only.

In the late 1980s and early 1990s Watson presented Channel 4's coverage of sumo tournaments.

=== Ireland, New Mexico and the Amazon (1991–2008) ===
Watson's introduction to his book Dark Nature, published in 1995, is signed " LYALL WATSON, On the Amazon. The Amazon was a converted fishing vessel that Watson used to sail the oceans during this period. His 2004 publication The Whole Hog lists his domicile, during suitable parts of the year, as "a cliff-top cottage on the rocky west coast of Ireland [and] an adobe ranch-house on the high desert of New Mexico".

Watson married Vivienne Mawson in 1961, and they divorced in 1966. His second wife was Jacquey Visick, and his third wife, Alice Coogan, died in 2003. He was the eldest of three brothers, one of whom (Andrew) lived in Gympie, Queensland, Australia. It was while visiting Andrew that he died of a stroke on 25 June 2008.

== Supernature (1973) ==
Watson began writing Supernature while visiting Greece in the summer of 1971. He was intending to honour a longstanding arrangement to rendezvous at the Temple of Zeus in Athens at the midsummer solstice with a Russian countess he had met nine years earlier, now married with children. Beforehand, he was seen on the island of Sifnos in the Cyclades, "white pants and a canvas sea bag", and by his own account was meeting hippies and fellow travellers returning from their journeys to the east, and realised that he knew a lot more about their wild enthusiasms, that is, the interface between science and the supernatural, than they did themselves. Keen to set it all down, he wrote Supernature, completed in 1972, but had difficulty finding a publisher for it. Its introduction is signed "Lyall Watson, Ph.D. Ios, Greece, 1971". It is possible that, at this time, Watson was also doing freelance filming of underwater archaeology in the Aegean.

In this book, Watson essentially takes every paranormal phenomenon, every belief that science frowned at in 1971, every mystical conviction and fringe idea that 1970s New Age thinking was finding itself attracted to, and looks for scientific evidence that might be able to explain or refute it. "Watson argues that the distinction between natural and supernatural is not a genuine division in reality but a limitation of current scientific knowledge, and that today's 'paranormal' will become tomorrow's biology." In doing so, he betrays what must have been a prior and longstanding interest of his in the paranormal, a familiarity with the results of related experiments reported both in mainstream scientific journals and in journals such as the Journal of Parapsychology, which he cites. His wedding cake in 1961 had, after all, featured a model of the Loch Ness Monster.

There is a lot that he doesn't believe in. He doesn't believe in ghosts, or in reincarnation, or in clairvoyance or precognition, and has little to say about magic. He is less sceptical, however, about astrology and dowsing. In the case of astrology, he spends many pages exploring the influence of sun, moon and the planets on life on Earth, explaining circadian and circannual rhythms, the effects of magnetic fields on living creatures and the way in which solar flares and even the motion of the moon and planets are able to alter the Earth's field and therefore affect all life that is sensitive to it, and many organisms are. He discusses the breeding cycles of marine creatures that rely on the phases of the moon, the development of the human foetus and cites large-scale statistical evidence to support a non-random spread of birth dates for children who go on to pursue particular professions.

In the case of dowsing, he discusses at length the ability of organisms to detect alterations in electromagnetic fields and the strength of gravity and tidal forces, and explores the concept of resonance in which tiny signals can be amplified. He notes the ability of elephants and other creatures to dig for water and to find it, and gives numerous instances where dowsing, he claims, has been proven to be successful. Like the phenomenon of poltergeists, he considers the veracity of dowsing, for water and for minerals, to be self-evident and widely accepted by involved professionals.

But his strongest convictions are for psychokinesis and telepathy. Watson discusses experiments conducted over a period of twenty-five years by J B Rhine at Duke University in North Carolina in the United States, many involving the statistical analysis of falling dice that were being urged to land in a certain way by human willpower alone. In Watson's own words: "Taken together, these experiments suggest that, for dice at least, there is evidence of a force of mental origin that can influence the movement of physical objects." Several years after writing Supernature, Watson introduced Uri Geller to the British public, and in 1979, in Lifetide, he describes his personal experience of seeing a five-year-old girl in Venice invert tennis balls in a seemingly impossible way simply by stroking them, leaving the rubber side suddenly outside and the furry side hidden inside.

With equal enthusiasm lies Watson's belief in telepathy. Near the very beginning of the book he writes: "...there is a continuous communication not only between living things and their environment, but amongst all things living in that environment. An intricate web of interaction connects all life into one vast, self-maintaining system. Each part is related to every other part and we are all part of the whole, part of Supernature." This is an idea building upon C G Jung's concept of a collective unconscious, and anticipating James Lovelock's Gaia hypothesis. Watson writes: "This kind of communication has not been proved, but if it exists, it would lend strong support to Jung's notion of a collective unconscious, in which all experience is shared."

Evidence for telepathy exists, in Watson's view, from numerous experiments with people in separate locations transferring thoughts, mostly by way of images on random selections of cards, with often high statistical significance, it is claimed. But he recognises that these often boring and repetitive experiments may not be ideal, conceding that most clear, anecdotal instances of telepathy between two individuals occur at times of raised awareness or high stress. To account for this, he supposes that "because a hundred million impulses pour down on our nervous system every second... the input is monitored and carefully controlled; of all the millions of incoming signals, only a small number reach the brain and a still smaller number get passed on to those areas where they can give rise to conscious awareness." This idea anticipates one of the most popular theories of consciousness in the 2020s, that of the global neuronal workspace theory (GNWT) "which envisions consciousness as a kind of stage."

== Gifts of Unknown Things (1976) ==
Unable to interest publishers in Supernature, Watson continued his work with Eric Lindblad and by 1973, following exploratory surveys and then a voyage for Lindblad to Indonesia and the Banda Sea, he returned to London to find that Supernature had at last found a publisher. In his book The Romeo Error, written in Bali, Indonesia, in 1974, he writes: "I have questioned a child on a remote Indonesian island, who was said to have special powers..." and goes on to describe her showing him what people looked like to her, with 'fires' located at points on the body corresponding to Indian Yogi tradition, although no such knowledge existed on the island community she lived in.

In Gifts of Unknown Things, published in 1976, Watson recounts what he presents as a true story of his shipwreak on a remote island in the Banda Sea following a storm. The two Indonesian crewmen he was sailing with soon elected to be rescued by visiting traders, but he chose to stay on the island to work as a teacher. In his book The Whole Hog, published in 2004, Watson reveals that the island he was (initially) marooned on was one in a long chain known as Nusa Tenggara, situated between the Indian Ocean to the south and the Flores Sea to the north. He appears to confirm that he spent "almost a year" on this island, teaching in its village school and playing host to a Sulawesi warty sow who lived amongst the stilts under his house.

Gifts of Unknown Things is a much larger account of his island sojourn, although the sow, Babi, is not mentioned. It is part anthropological narrative, part natural history excursion, part an account of a clash between traditional Indonesian island culture and Islam, part a description of some astonishing occurrences and part a speculative exploration, based on these occurrences, of the similarities (according to Watson) between traditional animism and magic and interpretations of quantum mechanics and modern physics. All wrapped into an autobiographical account of the time Watson spent on this island. But it is in very large part, also, a biography; an account of a twelve-year-old village girl named Tia.

Tia was one of Watson's pupils, and like the girl mentioned in The Romeo Error, she has special powers. All the astonishing occurrences involve her. The descriptions of natural history in the book include an account of a bird that builds a massive mound to lay a single egg and a small fish that can jump from pool to pool on a beach at low tide, knowing the route back to the sea apparently from memory. Watson gives an account of the traditional islanders' creation myth, involving a sea turtle, the bringing of 'gifts of unknown things', including rice, by a goddess called Hainuwele, and gives a description of an old lady teaching a young girl the intricate moves and gestures of the island's native dances. This girl is Tia. Watson describes the daily life of the village, its rice paddies and buffalos, its fishing techniques, its quiet acceptance of both tradition and Islam. But tensions lie beneath the surface. Following the children's insistence that they experience different sounds as specific colours, and Tia's ability to predict the safe return of her uncle, while there is no sign of his boat yet on the horizon (by seeing a specific colour over the sea in the expected direction of his return, she explains), strange events are triggered after a sperm whale is stranded on a beach nearby.

Tia is a dancer. In opposition to Western tradition, she does not see the world objectively but subjectively. She sees herself as being a part of the natural world, in a spiritual sense. She dances with it. And because it is Ramadan and the whale is unclean, the island's Muslim cleric forbids the villages from helping the creature. Some help anyway. Tia ministers to and communes with this whale for twenty-four-hours before it dies in her company. Afterwards, she finds herself able to heal; first the scalded foot of a lad on the beach simply by holding it in her hands, then the ailments of many villagers, accelerating the natural healing process by touch alone. She calms a madman threatening to injure himself with a knife, and uses seemingly magical techniques on a terrified bride, the same techniques that Watson has seen in the Amazon basin and in the Philippines. Then an elderly man, who appeared to die of exhaustion while helping a fishing boat to flee an approaching tsunami out at sea, comes back to life again before his burial, mirroring Watson's theme in The Romeo Error. Tia is implicated in his resurrection. The Muslim cleric denounces her. Events begin to take a combatitive turn. Tia brings fire down onto the village mosque and there is a very dramatic ending to the story.

And a story it is. In many ways, the book reads like a novel.

As an illustration of its being "at once scientific exploration and imaginative adventure", Watson's description in The Whole Hog of his arrival at the island following the storm is that they saw it on the horizon on the morning of the third day and sailed towards it. But in Gifts of Unknown Things, the opening chapter describes in detail their sighting of the island the evening before and, seeing the white line of the reef, chose to drift through the night and attempt a landing in the morning. That night, a large number of seemingly communicating bioluminescent squid encircle the boat, giving Watson an opportunity to describe, in one of his many scientific digressions, their eyes being too advanced for their tiny brains. Then a huge, shadowy creature rises from the depths, as though, Watson implies, it had been seeing through the squid's eyes. "I know it was alive and I believe it was conscious", he writes. This leads him to propose a theory in which all life is interconnected, and he uses the hologram as an analogy, in which every part contains, within itself, the whole.

This idea is illustrated again much later in the book when Tia tries to communicate her thoughts and beliefs to a village girl by dancing before her in an upland grove, as Watson looks on. She conveys by gesture and by movement her unity with the trees around her, and the girl nods her understanding. Then Tia makes the trees disappear and reappear again, covering her eyes with her hands, on and off, they appear and disappear, as though reality is under her control.

== Lifetide ==
Lifetide was published in 1979 and continued Watson's exploration of the interface between biology, zoology, extrasensory perception and the supernatural. It was in this book that his concept of a spontaneous acquisition of knowledge by an organism through the transmission of unconscious thoughts, mirroring C G Jung's collective unconscious, was coined the 'Hundredth Monkey'. It rested on an example of an acquired behavior in monkeys that was later disputed.

== Other writings ==
=== Nature and the paranormal ===
==== The Romeo Error (1974) ====
The Romeo Error was reprinted with revisions in 1976 as a Coronet edition and again in 1987 as a Sceptre edition, called The Biology of Death. In these books, Watson explains how it is impossible to state with certainty an exact moment of death and gives many historical accounts of people waking from presumed death. It is equally impossible, he argues, to say where on the scale of biochemical organisation, from complex molecules to viruses, bacteria, simple cells and multicellular organisms, life truly begins.

To account for this, Watson's main thesis is that there is another realm of being, a second, 'etherial' level belonging to the human personality and consciousness that lies beyond the somatic, physical body recognised by science and medicine, and not necessarily attached to it in space. This 'second system', as he calls it, may be involved in the specific organisation of cells in all multicellular bodies and be the seat of long-term memories in higher mammals, for which no suitable location (in the 1970s) had been found in the brain. It might also be responsible for phenomena such as out-of-body experiences, psychokinesis, ghostly apparitions and spiritual healing. This second system may be observable, he claims. as an 'aura' extending from the human body seen by mystics and spiritualists, and might equate with a 'bioplasma' which can be detected electromagnetically. It can outlast physical death but will deteriorate following clinical death, whenever this moment is placed, although he acknowledges that the often consistent accounts of near-death experiences might be linked to chemical changes in an oxygen-starved brain experienced before consciousness returns. This second system cannot, in his view, be equated with a soul.

Watson believed in the interconnectedness of all living things, made clear in many of his writings. "If a network of communication does exist between all living things..." he writes in The Romeo Error. But the evidence of apparent hypnotic regression to former lives, the appearance of disembodied voices on magnetic tape and mediumistic communication with the dead do not convince him of the post-death existence of a soul. Rather, looking at both psychological and other evidence, he writes that: "...this points to the conclusion that personality is very much grounded in the body and makes it difficult to believe that anything of the unique character of an individual can survive the elimination of the body on which it depends...". So no personal soul.

Comparing this second system with the second of seven Hindu levels of being, of which the higher ones correspond to a wider inclusiveness with all of being, he goes on to describe the enlightenment of the Buddha, Siddhartha Gautama. Such a view of a second system and then higher, more integrated levels of being may correspond to recent accounts (2020s) of near-death experiences where a short period of time in which a person with flatlined medical responses can view their own body from above, and travel to locations nearby, soon grows into a sudden and extreme sensation of inclusiveness and loss of individual identity. This conforms with the Buddhist theory of 'no soul'. But The Romeo Error is clearly focused on Watson's second system, "that the body must operate on at least one other level beyond the one we know [as] the physical or somatic system." and that "it seems to make biological sense to assume that the second system's time is as limited as the first."

In an urge to explore all lines of enquiry with equal objectivity, Watson has been accused of credulity. He spent many months in the Philippines during the 1970s with Spiritualist healers; however, not with native Hilot healers but mostly with a Christian sect associated with a Spiritist Society started in 1857 by a French mystic known as Allan Kardec, using highly visual, surgical techniques of which all recordings and photographs that Watson took seemed magically to disappear before they were able to be used. But this does not sway him from describing their procedures in enthusiastic detail, even as late as 1987.

==== The Nature of Things (1990) ====
"It is easy to be alarmist about artificial intelligence. The whole idea of 'thinking' things is scary."

Watson wrote that extract from The Nature of Things in 1989 or 1990. Thirty-six or more years later, in July 2026, Sarah Scoles wrote in the popular American science journal Scientific American: "In the beginning, people created computers. Some of them said, 'Let there be software,' and it was mostly good. Then they said, 'Let the software be more intelligent,' and they called that intelligence artificial. And in November of 2025 the White House launched an AI program called the Genesis Mission." Of the twenty-seven challenges the Genesis Mission aims to address, seven are concerned with nuclear weapons. In 2023, scientists cautioned the AI industry to halt development until more was understood. In September 2026, "OpenAI's chief scientist Jacub Pachocki called for 'extreme caution' over AI's progress, warning more intervention may be needed to ensure 'humans remain in control of the future'."

In The Nature of Things, published in 1990, Watson gives a cautionary account of humankind's obsession with new things, as though we are being guided along a path that may not be wholly of our own choosing. His animistic leanings cause him to be both wary of inanimate objects that may be capable of having life and awareness of their own (he provides a host of anecdotal examples gleaned from tabloid newspapers worldwide, but mostly from Britain, of unexplained misbehaviours and seemingly impossible malfunctions) and of our own subconscious interaction and involvement with these inanimate things, made plain through the phenomena of psychokinesis and poltergeists. He gives examples of watches stopping on the wearer's death, of automobiles refusing to start for certain people, even conspiring to injure them, and of jinxed ships and similarly affected items salvaged from a crashed airplane, suggesting that inanimate objects can acquire a memory for events they have been through. He discusses strange behaviour over the years from things people have historically given personalities to – swords and daggers, statues, bells, ships, automobiles – and explores the evolutionary history of artifacts and machines as though a new branch of life may be in the process of creation.

Concerning the worldwide telephone network in 1990, Watson writes: "Each call we make could be part of an educational process, bringing the system rapidly to consciousness, feeding it not only with facts but with feelings." In the 2020s, large language models such as ChatGPT are capable of displaying not only perfectly written paragraphs but at least a simulation of consciousness. Some modern theories of consciousness allow all inanimate matter in the universe a share in it, a concept termed panpsychism.

=== Biology and natural history ===
==== Omnivore (1971) ====
Omnivore: The Role of Food in Human Evolution was first published in 1971, the same year that Watson wrote Supernature. It was begun during the early 1960s, while Watson was still a student, and is very heavily influenced by his work with Morris. The book seeks to illustrate and explain many facets of human nature in terms of those already existing among other animals, particularly food-gathering amongst mammals. Like Morris's The Naked Ape, Watson compares and explains human behaviours in terms of those of other mammals, in his case concentrating on parallels relating to our evolutionary progression from primate tree-dweller and fruit-eater through savannah hunter-gatherer and a relatively short carnivorous phase into becoming a full omnivore. Numerous human behaviors, he argues, are closely linked to this unique evolutionary progression.

The book has been criticized for overzealous application of this main idea: "that all aspects of man's behaviour can be explained in terms of feeding alone. Such reductionism inevitably leads to gross overstatements...". And already Watson is willing to include beliefs that stray from biological orthodoxy. Following a description of elephants' ability to dig for and find water in dried-up stream beds, he adds: "Experiments with human water diviners show that we respond to the electromagnetic field set up by running water."

==== Whales of the World (1981) ====
Following Watson's involvement in the creation of the Indian Ocean Whale Sanctuary in the late 1970s, he teamed up with the artist Tom Ritchie to produce an extensive field guide for the general reader and interested mariner, entitled Whales of the World: A Handbook and Field Guide to all the living species of whales, dolphins and porpoises. The book is dedicated to "[the MS Lindblad Explorer] and to her officers and crew", whose adventure cruises around the globe for the previous ten years had included them both as resident naturalists. These voyages, he writes, "made it possible for us to get close to most of the world's living whales, dolphins and porpoises in their natural habitats."

The book contains an extensive introduction to cetacean taxonomy, anatomy, breathing, feeding, hearing, sound production, social habits and world distribution before launching into a detailed field guide for each individual species. The book is aimed primarily at voyagers, mariners, tourists and seafarers who may come into contact with whales and dolphins while at sea and wish to identify the animals they are looking at. But an important secondary purpose, given the often sparse data (in the 1970s) about many of the species listed, was to enlist an army of mariners and coastal observers as casual assistant zoologists. Watson writes: "The main purpose of this guide is to help you to understand what you see, help you to give a name to the animals involved and make your observations coherent, consistent and useful to the few professional cetologists, who cannot on their own keep watch on the vast world ocean and its shores."

The book was largely ignored by academics who criticized it on two counts: for taking it upon itself to rationalize or even change the naming of species when current usage was considered by Watson to be problematic, confusing or unhelpful; and for sometimes giving the impression that more was known about a particular species of whale than was actually the case in 1981. In addition, in the opening pages Watson promotes a view of whale evolution that had been advocated in the 1960s but not accepted by a majority of zoologists. Tom Ritchie's illustrations have also come in for some criticism, amongst general accolades, for a sometimes excessive and unrealistic use of colour and contrast.

But the book was not written for academics, it is a field guide for amateurs and enthusiasts, and Watson makes it clear that he is deliberately trying to shake things up by unilaterally giving new names to some species, in the hope that this will prod the academic community into some necessary action. To its intended audience the book was well received, its 1985 paperback edition was reprinted in 1988, and it gained complements amongst the criticism even from academic reviewers.

==== Heaven's Breath (1984) ====
A look at the wind, from every conceivable direction. Written in an engaging and often humorous style for the general reader, packed with facts and anecdotes, and awarded Bernard Levin's Book of the Year for the British Sunday Newspaper The Observer in 1984. "In Heaven's Breath, Lyall Watson blends science, history, folklore and anecdote to explore the many wonders of wind."

The Earth's atmosphere has changed considerably over the planet's history and seems to be part of a thermostatic control allowing life on Earth to have maintained, and still maintain, a suitable temperature for itself, despite changing solar intensity. Watson reveals himself as a fully paid-up member of James Lovelock's Gaia Hypothesis. The movement of this atmosphere, the wind, carries heat from the equator to the poles, allowing for temperatures suitable for life almost everywhere on the planet. The troposphere, stratosphere, mesosphere and ionosphere blanket the Earth, winds in the troposphere distribute heat and provide both predictability and endless variety to weather systems at the surface. The wind gave the Fertile crescent in the Middle East its nurturing westerlies as the northern ice melted ten thousand years ago; it dictated the pattern of human migration into the pacific four thousand years ago, gave sails to European explorers and brought unexpected relief to the Japanese from seaborne invasion in AD 1274. Windmills spread all over Europe in the late Middle Ages and now give the promise of widespread electric power generation from wind farms.

In addition to salt, clay particles, sand and extraterrestrial dust, wind contains a myriad of tiny living things, including pollen, bacteria, viruses and fungal spores, as well as millions upon millions of tiny insects that use the wind everywhere, to migrate and to propagate. A large number of plants and trees ensure widespread dispersal of their seed through the agency of the wind. The wind propels spiders who take to the air on gossamer sails, it is alive with insects, birds and bats, determining the direction and timing of migration routes, and just as surely casting pioneering individuals upon unexpected shores. Varying wind strength affects humans and animals in many ways, changing behaviour, determining habitat, dispersing man-made pollutants and mixing gasses that cause acid rain and fuel the Greenhouse Effect. Named winds, like the Sirocco, affect human mood and psychology through a sudden alteration in humidity, temperature, turbidity, purity or state of ionization. There are strangely similar wind creation myths from all over the world; the Greeks and Romans personified four cardinal winds and gave each a personality. English literature has preferred a more natural evocation, as have the paintings of John Constable, William Turner, and the music of Berlioz and Debussy.

==== The Water Planet: a Celebration of the Wonder of Water (1988) ====
A coffee table book, or perhaps a teenager's introduction to Earth Science. Written in easily comprehensible text, the pages are filled with revealing facts and figures about water, and copiously illustrated by the American landscape photographer Jerry Derbyshire. Like Heaven's Breath, it takes a property of the Earth, in this case the planet's water, and studies its form and behaviour from every possible angle: physical properties, chemical idiosyncrasies, erosion, meteorology, ice and glaciation, rivers and lakes, the hydrological cycle, biology, its passage through plants and trees, biochemistry, atmospheric physics, geography, its role in human evolution, the development of agriculture, and its celebration in religion, mythology and literature.

Published in America in 1988. Watson and Derbyshire had plans to extend this work into a series of four: Earth, Air, Fire and Water, an ambition that was cut short by Derbyshire's death in 1989.

==== Dark Nature (1995) ====
Perhaps the most mainstream of Watson's extended, exploratory musings on biology and life in general, Dark Nature has also been described as 'groundbreaking' and 'fascinating'. It was written on board his converted ocean-going trawler Amazon and takes a look at the nature of evil from the viewpoint of a naturalist, evolutionary zoologist and anthropologist. Taking in also psychology, philosophy, history and the works of literary authors, the book was inspired, perhaps, by the Rwandan genocide in 1994 and the murder of three-year-old James Bulger by two ten-year-old boys early in 1993, which he discusses in some depth.

Evolution is powered by Richard Dawkin's selfish genes and the consequences of this, Watson explains, are not only the amazing diversity of plants and animals in the world today but the necessary presence of a struggle for survival and the fight for successful reproduction by each individual. Baby birds push siblings out of the nest. Rutting male elephant seals kill one another for dominance in order to pass on more of their genes to the next generation. This is the way nature works. One of James Bulger's killers, Robert Thompson, whose mother, according to Watson, was in the process of rejecting him in favour of a new arrival by a different father, and who had never learned the difference between right and wrong from either of his parents, acted without any cultural guidance. This was evil.

In conjunction with humankind's large brain, which has evolved partly as the result of the need to cope with social interactions in groups, primitive societies have often come up with novel ways of managing aggression in a controllable and sustainable way. 'Some of my best friends are cannibals', Watson admits, referring to the Asmat people of Indonesian New Guinea. But recent technical and cultural advances in human society have not had time to adapt to and take into consideration basic human instincts, leading to industrial-scale warfare, the use of guns in impulsive homicide, incitement to mass murder and the Holocaust.

But the book ends on an optimistic note, for all its disturbing examples of cruelty from biology and human history. It is a work, according to one reviewer, with 'range and depth... a book to be read with deliberateness... a fluid, elegant study of what it means to be bad.' If the next few decades can be safely negotiated, Watson suggests, cultural evolution may become more important than genetic evolution in our rapidly evolving species, ideas will become the new genes, to be selected for or against according to their survival value, natural instincts brought under control and a sustainable balance achieved between 'nature' and 'nurture'. A stable ecology in a human dominated world that will act for the benefit of both individual, society and the planet. According to Watson, almost a definition of the 'good'.

==== Jacobson's Organ: and the Remarkable Nature of Smell (1999) ====
In a work of scientific explanation, historical commentary and only a little wild speculation, Watson introduces the reader to the evolution of smell, from its beginnings in early fish, through amphibians and snakes to its indispensable use by contemporary mammals, including dogs, but also by humans. In particular, there are two organs associated with smell, both of which humans possess: the olfactory apparatus in the nose that is linked by neurons to higher areas of the brain, and a separate apparatus consisting of two pits in the nasal region known as Jacobson's Organ, which is able to detect heavier molecules and send emotive messages directly to unconscious parts of the brain. It is this sensory pathway that Watson explores as an explanation for moments of ESP and clairvoyance that might otherwise be deemed supernatural.

Humans, Watson assures us, are smelly creatures. Deliberately so, We secrete pheromones from our armpits and our groins, and volatiles from the entire surface of our skin. The historical record shows that the use of incense in ritual dates from the time of Ancient Egypt or earlier, and the modern perfume industry is perfectly aware of the often powerful human sexual messages conveyed by smell. But it is moments of intuition that interest Watson, when we instinctively recoil from something or someone, or are attracted to a situation or someone, for no apparent reason. And this, he believes, must have high survival value in any organism that possesses it.

In a chapter named 'The Sixth Sense', Watson writes: "Clairvoyance is usually described as mental 'seeing' or a way of knowing what exists 'out of sight'. A clairvoyant is said to be someone who has exceptional 'insight'. The emphasis, as usual, is a visual one, but I suspect that the information garnered is far more often olfactory."

==== The Whole Hog: Exploring the Extraordinary Potential of Pigs (2004) ====
Watson's final book was published in 2004. The Whole Hog is a celebration of pigs, both wild and domestic. He describes all sixteen species of wild pigs, including the American peccaries, the many island species found in Indonesia, the five species of African pigs and the European wild boar (from which most farm pigs are derived), explaining their evolutionary history, their habits and their behaviour in the wild. Pigs began to be domesticated in broadly the same era as dogs, about 20,000 years ago. In addition to studies and observations as a zoologist and naturalist, Watson introduces three pigs that he has kept as pets over the years: Hoover the warthog in Africa, anecdotes of whom fill the early childhood section of his autobiography Warriors, Warthogs and Wisdom; Salsa, a collared peccary that Watson rescued from a hunt in Northern Mexico; and a Sulawesi warty sow named Babi, who lived beneath his hut-on-stilts when he was teaching on a remote island in Indonesia, an experience recounted in Gifts of Unknown Things. Hoover was very clean, well-behaved and playful. Babi often accompanied Watson on his jaunts around the tropical island. Most wild pigs, it seems, are clean animals, foraging a home range where feeding areas, sleeping areas and latrines are kept meticulously apart.

In his first publication, Omnivore, Watson lauded the omnivorous lifestyle, concentrating on humans but including pigs as beneficiaries of its advantages. In this, his final book, his subject comes full circle, in a celebration of another omnivorous species that he is now willing to acknowledge may share attributes that most people would regard as uniquely human. In addition to studies of pigs in the wild, augmented with his own experience of pigs as pets, Watson gives a history of domestic breeding, anecdotes of pig intelligence, an account of the role of pigs in ancient mythology and gives a commentary upon a growing body of biological research (in 2004) that he believes confirms his opinion that pigs are intelligent, sentient beings.

In Whales of the World, Watson discussed whale intelligence and concluded that "we may soon learn to come to terms with an intelligence in many ways comparable with our own." That was published in 1981. By 2004, Watson is clearly conceding consciousness to other mammals as well. Speaking of Salsa, his Mexican peccary, Watson writes that "he discovered the possibilities that opened up with each new opportunity, and I could see the intelligence growing in his eyes... " Later in the book he writes: "Pigs are aware beings, individuals with minds of their own... [but] we keep missing the point, unable to get around the confusion that lies between 'pig' and 'pork', between being conscious and being bacon."

=== Biography and autobiography ===
==== Lightning Bird (1982) ====
Adrian Boshier was raised in England, but when his mother married again and took her son to 1950s South Africa, he purposely wandered into the African bush aged 16 and lived off the land, learning the hard way how to survive. At first he merely wandered, then he discovered a penchant for snake-catching that gave him the opportunity to sell snakes to medical laboratories for their venom, earning money and reputation. Later still, he became involved with Raymond Dart, anatomist and anthropologist at the University of the Witwatersrand in Johannesburg, and turned each of his subsequent wanderings into something of an anthropological field trip for Dart. He was appointed a field officer to the Museum of Man and Science and reported to Dart with each return to Johannesburg. He was an epileptic and died on 18 November 1978 on the shores of the Indian ocean, probably as a result of a seizure.

Watson was acquainted with Boshier, and while in South Africa he was asked by "those closest to Adrian Boshier" to go through a "collection of tattered diaries and some notes towards the first draft of a book" which he had left behind. Watson worked these, as well as interviews with all those who had known Boshier well, including his friend Raymond Dart, into the book Lightning Bird, ostensibly a biography of Boshier, dated 1981 in its introduction and published in 1982.

It is 'ostensibly' a biography because it is more than that as well. It has been accused of over-romanticizing Boshier's life, "and indeed his pen soars in passages that capture the harsh beauty of landscape or the eloquence of tribal legends", but with his usual mixture of frequent scientific asides, personal theories and a plot that reads like a novel, it bears similarity to the part biography of the Indonesian girl Tia in Gifts of Unknown Things. Watson describes Boshier's early exploits with snakes, his travel always on foot, living off the land, drinking the water that the native Africans drank and being accepted into their community, partly because of his epilepsy, which singled him out as being possessed by spirits, and partly because of his affinity with snakes, giving him his totem animal.

Three relatively short periods in Bashier's life are dramatized by Watson to form the bulk of the book. First Bashier's discovery that slithers of bone and round hammer stones were used by contemporary tribespeople in food preparation, which Dart was delighted to receive samples of because it reinforced his ideas about similar, disputed artifacts found in association with early, pre-Stone Age hominids. Then Watson takes the reader through a period of several months where Bashier goes up into the Makgabeng highlands in the northern Transvaal and discovers a large quantity of cave art, is given instruction in their meaning and in tribal lore and religious belief in a village at the foot of these mountains prior to initiation into the first degree of spirit diviner. Watson includes many asides describing cave art and the history of African populations. And then, skipping over a gap of several years spent in Johannesburg, Boshier returns to this same village to find the people suffering from a severe drought. He is immediately sent up into the mountains to commune with the spirits and discovers where the village's tribal rain-making drums were hidden more than half a century before, to stop missionaries from burning them. They are returned, repaired with due ceremony, played by instructed diviners all through the night, and the rains come the next morning.

==== Warriors, Warthogs and Wisdom (1997) ====
Warriors, Warthogs and Wisdom is a book for children, but probably best enjoyed by adults. It is a collection of anecdotes relating to Watson's memory of his childhood up to the age of nine, spent on the farm of his grandparents in South Africa. His mother worked as farm supervisor for her parents while her husband was serving with the Royal Air Force during World War II. Her eldest son Malcolm (Lyall Watson) was put into the care of a Zulu employee and elder who had become a family friend; a man named Jabula. Watson's parents spoke English, and before the age of three Watson was reading books in English. His maternal grandparents spoke Africaans and a little English, Jabula spoke the Zulu language, and by the age of five, Watson claims to have been proficient in all three languages. Jabula gave him the Zulu name Mbuzi – the Goat – because he was prepared to try anything. Jabula was not only the son of a tribal chief, but a Zulu warrior and practitioner of native spiritualism and herbal medicine, and he and the young Watson frequently spent many hours of the day wandering the bush, where Jabula taught his young charge how to live off the land, forage, dig for water, track animals and stay out of harm's way. He also imbued Watson with the tenets of animism, that remained a big driving force throughout Watson's life.

It is possible to guess also where Watson got his spirit of rebellion from. His grandmother Ouma, old ma, features heavily in the story. She drew devil's horns on stamps bearing the head of a certain statesman before posting them. She bought a Harley Davidson motorbike to ride into town on when asked to take a driving test for the car she had driven for forty years. She tricked the authorities, who insisted upon a Christian burial for her husband, Oupa, when he died. In collusion with Jabula, she took Oupa to sit in his favourite place, as he had wanted, on a rock where he used to watch the sun set, to be the food for birds and scavengers, while burying stones and old newspapers in a coffin in the churchyard. And she took Watson, when he was nine years old, to a native village at the foot of the Drakensberg Escarpment to be initiated into the local culture there, in a ceremony at which Watson learned that his grandmother and the local chief had been great friends in their youth.

In a radio interview given in 1982, Watson, says that at the age of seven he was given a large book of African birds called Roberts Birds of South Africa and by the age of eight knew them all. In Warriors, Warthogs and Wisdom he describes how he and Jabula found many overturned querns that former occupants of the land had left behind in the area around the house. Turning them back over, the depressions in the stone from the pounding of grain made fantastic bird baths, and they were placed all around the house where it became Watson's routine job to fill them with water, often multiple times a day. They attracted so many bird species that Watson was entranced. Early one morning, a mother warthog appeared with three piglets, to drink. One of those piglets became Hoover, Watson's pet warthog, in a story that fills the final quarter of the book.

== Apartheid South Africa ==
Watson's directorship of Johannesburg Zoo was short-lived (1967–8) because of attempts by the Johannesburg authorities to impose apartheid restrictions upon public attendance, which Watson resisted. In his 1982 Desert Island Discs broadcast for the BBC, Watson also reveals that while studying for his PhD in London in the early 1960s he had no intention of returning to South Africa, citing difficulties with the authorities while a student there.

This attitude can be traced back to his early childhood. Not only was he placed in the care of a Zulu minder whom he grew to love and respect, and who taught him the Zulu language, culture and religion, but this man, Jabula, saved him from possible death when young Watson encountered three bandits on the way back from school one afternoon. They had crossed into South Africa from the nearby Mozambique border. Two of them carried machetes and the other started handling the boy roughly. Jabula was accustomed to shadowing Watson from a distance during his journeys to and from an elementary school on an adjoining farm, a distance of three miles, and suddenly appeared before them in full Zulu warrior frenzy, stamping feet, rising Zulu battle cry and whirling a stick around him that floored the man holding the boy and frightened the armed assailants away, despite his advancing years.

Watson's grandmother Ouma had no truck with apartheid. She drew devils horns on stamps depicting the Prime Minister, "a man responsible for making some stupid laws that tried to keep white and black people from becoming friends. Ouma disapproved of him...". When he was nine, Ouma took Watson to a native village many miles away to be initiated into the clan whose chief and she had been a great friends when they were young.

== Conservation ==
Watson's introduction to conservation began at an early age. His grandfather Oupa wouldn't have cats or dogs on the family farm because they drove away the wildlife. The farm itself grew sisal, but like most South African farms, there were large areas away from the farmstead that were essentially wild. Most farmers gained income from these by shooting and hunting for horn and meat. Watson's grandparents did not. They left the land to the wildlife. Oupa spoke with great fondness of the huge herds of eland that had passed the farm in his youth. 'It was like liquid life,' he remembered. Watson writes: "Now these elegant antelope can be found only in small groups, mostly in game reserves and national parks. But also on private farms, whose owners have begun to protect their wildlife and to set up a chain of thousands of natural sanctuaries in which Africa's birds and mammals, frogs and fish, can live safely and survive."

== Contradiction ==
It has already been noted how a description of the arrival of Watson's storm damaged craft at an island in Indonesia in The Whole Hog' differs from his vivid recollection of the same arrival in Gifts of Unknown Things. There is a similarly odd discrepancy between Lightning Bird and Warriors, Warthogs and Wisdom. In Lightning Bird published in 1982, Watson describes a typical white South African's interpretation of the activities of witch-doctors, negatively implying a certain element of cunning deception, but then in Warriors, Warthogs and Wisdom, published in 1997, he describes his black mentor Jabula performing exactly the same steps when called upon to find the killer of Oupa's favourite goat.

== Accolades and criticism ==
Most criticism has been directed towards Supernature. Ten years after its publication, Watson confessed that he no longer thought of the book as his, it had become such public property. Beyond Supernature, published more than ten years later, takes a more sober look at the extraordinary in science and everyday life, albeit from a similar stance, embracing Watson's belief in animism, an endorsement of James Lovelock's Gaia hypothesis and Watson's expanded version of Carl Gustav Jung's collective unconscious to include psychic interconnectedness within all of life, but with less confidence in spiritualism.

== Bibliography ==
- Omnivore: The Role of Food in Human Evolution (1971)
- Supernature: A Natural History of the Supernatural (1973)
- The Romeo Error (1974) (Later reprinted as The Biology of Death)
- Gifts of Unknown Things: An Indonesian Adventure (1976)
- Lifetide: a Biology of the Unconscious (1979)
- Whales of the World: A Field Guide to the Cetaceans (1981)
- Lightning Bird: An African Adventure (1982)
- Heaven's Breath: A Natural History of the Wind (1984)
- Bali Entranced: A Celebration of Ritual (1985) – published in Japanese only
- Earthworks: Ideas on the Edge of Natural History (1986) (Later reprinted as Dreams of Dragons)
- Beyond Supernature: A New Natural History of the Supernatural (1986) (Later reprinted as Supernature 2)
- The Water Planet: A Celebration of the Wonder of Water (1988)
- Neophilia: The Tradition of the New (1989)
- Sumo: A Guide to Sumo Wrestling (1989)
- The Nature of Things: The Secret Life of Inanimate Objects (1990)
- Gifts of Unknown Things: A True Story of Nature, Healing and Initiation from Indonesia's ''Dancing Island'' (1992)
- Lasting Nostalgia: Essays Out of Africa (1992) – published in Japanese only
- Turtle Islands: Ritual in Indonesia (1995)
- Dark Nature: A Natural History of Evil (1995)
- Dreams of Dragons: An Exploration and Celebration of the Mysteries of Nature (1996)
- Monsoon: Essays on the Indian Ocean (1996) – published in Japanese only
- Lost Cradle: A Collection of Dialogues (1997) – published in Japanese only
- Warriors, Warthogs, and Wisdom: Growing up in Africa (1997)
- Jacobson's Organ and the Remarkable Nature of Smell (2000)
- Elephantoms: Tracking the Elephant (2002)
- The Whole Hog: Exploring the Extraordinary Potential of Pigs (2004)
