= That's Love (Jim Capaldi song) =

Single by Jim Capaldi

from the album Fierce Heart
- B-side: "Runaway"
- Released: April 1983
- Recorded: 1983
- Genre: Soft rock
- Length: 3:37
- Label: Asylum; Atlantic
- Songwriter: Jim Capaldi
- Producers: Steve Winwood; Jim Capaldi

Jim Capaldi singles chronology
"Living on the Edge" (1983)	"That's Love" (1983)	"Tonight You're Mine" (1983)

"That's Love" is a song by British singer-songwriter Jim Capaldi. It was released as the first single from the 1983 album Fierce Heart. "That's Love" has since been compiled onto both the greatest hits album Prince of Darkness (1995) and the boxed set Dear Mr Fantasy: The Jim Capaldi Story (2011). It featured his former Traffic bandmate Steve Winwood, who co-produced the song, as well as played synthesizers, performed backing vocals and acted in the music video.

== Background, composition and description ==
"That's Love" was written mostly while Capaldi was in Brazil; it developed further over the course of recording sessions in England.

The song features a simple arrangement with synthesizers, vocals, a drum machine and an almost inaudible acoustic guitar. The lyrics present two conflicting views of love. The verses are cynical ("Young couple there going insane / Fussing and fighting then they make up again / That's love") while the chorus is idealistic ("You stood by me / All through the good times / And through the bad times"). The backing vocals at the end are by Steve and Nicole Winwood, who were themselves having marriage problems at the time. Steve Winwood also played all the synthesizers, including both solos.

== Music video ==
The song was promoted with a music video involving a mini-love story told through a montage. The shots alternate between angry arguments, loving embraces, bitter silences and scenes of quiet companionship. Eric Bogosian and Jo Bonney, married less than a year at the time, played the couple.

In contrast to the vast majority of music videos at the time, which would prominently feature the performing artist lip-synching the song, Capaldi appears in the video in a minor acting role only. He and co-producer Steve Winwood portray two friends looking on as the romantic protagonists of the video walk arm-in-arm. Capaldi and Winwood appear together in two brief scenes, and the video ends with a shot of Capaldi entering the frame alone in front of the couple.

== Personnel ==
- Jim Capaldi – lead vocals, drums, percussion, LinnDrum programming
- Steve Winwood – synthesizers, LinnDrum programming, backing vocals
- Pete Bonas – acoustic guitar
- Nicole Winwood – backing vocals

== Chart performance ==
The track was Capaldi's biggest hit in the U.S., peaking at number 28 on the Billboard Hot 100 in summer 1983, while becoming a bigger hit on Billboard‘s AC chart, peaking at No. 3.
