= Ron Amundson =

American philosopher

Ronald Amundson (born 1946) is an American philosopher currently Professor Emeritus at University of Hawaiʻi at Hilo, retired since 2012, and an Elected Fellow of the American Association for the Advancement of Science.

== Education ==
He earned his B.A. in 1969 and Ph.D. in 1975, both from the University of Wisconsin–Madison.

== Research ==
His interests are evolutionary biology and he is recognized for his book The Changing Role of the Embryo in Evolutionary Thought (2005, ISBN 0521806992) currently held in 592 libraries.

== Works ==
=== The Changing Role of the Embryo in Evolutionary Thought ===
Book published in 2005, by Cambridge University Press. Reviewer Minelli, writing for journal Heredity, described the book as "thought-provoking" and focusing on "two sides, historical and philosophical, of what he regards as the unbridgeable contrast between the Evolutionary Synthesis and today's evolutionary developmental biology, or Evo-Devo." Examples of apparently conflicting epistemologies are: "function vs form, population vs ontogeny, adaptationism vs structuralism, and even transmission genetics vs developmental genetics." According to Minelli, these debates are oversimplified, preventing ideal coverage and demonstrating Amundson's advocacy for evolutionary developmental biology's focus on organism development and criticism that the modern synthesis minimizes it in favor of structural heredity and population genetics, but the book remains a useful reference overview, including on the history of those developments.

In a review for University of Notre Dame Philosophical Reviews, assistant professor of philosophy Alan C Love wrote that "The Changing Role of the Embryo in Evolutionary Thought is a revisionist history of evolutionary theorizing through the lens of embryological considerations", "to expose common mischaracterizations of historical episodes in the biological sciences that result from particular theoretical commitments" and "demonstrate how these mischaracterizations arise out of philosophical positions [... that] lead to a conceptualization of evolutionary theory that excludes any role for development", that it considers "questions that have been largely ignored in philosophy of biology". Amundson uses a philosophical strategy including principles like "inductivist caution" and "cautious realism" in his analysis of the history of biology. Love recommends the book to students in philosophy of biology but criticized it for relying on mostly secondary sources for its exploration of history, that appears to be a paradox for building a revisionist history. He cites a quote suggesting that it may be because the criticism Amundson was looking for was lacking in primary sources. Love also criticized the presentation of debates in a simplistic and sometimes incongruent way, like presenting some views as being fundamentally in opposition to each other, where they could be complementary.
