= Repetition priming =

Type of procedural memory

Repetition priming refers to improvements in a behavioural response when stimuli are repeatedly presented. The improvements can be measured in terms of accuracy or reaction time and can occur when the repeated stimuli are either identical or similar to previous stimuli. These improvements have been shown to be cumulative, so as the number of repetitions increases the responses get continually faster up to a maximum of around seven repetitions. These improvements are also found when the repeated items are changed slightly in terms of orientation, size and position. The size of the effect is also modulated by the length of time the item is presented for and the length time between the first and subsequent presentations of the repeated items.

== Description ==
Repetition priming can occur without a person being aware of either the repeats or the improvements in his/her response, so it is generally thought to involve implicit memory processes that are dissociable from explicit memory processes. This idea has support from findings that amnesic patients with damage to limbic and/or diencephalic structures show measurable repetition priming effects but have deficits on explicit measures of memory. However, some researchers suggest that implicit and explicit memory systems are not in fact separate. Repetition priming has also been associated with attentional processes, stimulus expectation and episodic memory.

Research into repetition priming has been used to investigate the nature of mechanisms underlying the behavioural effects of rapid learning. In utilizing measures of repetition suppression, the putative neural correlate of repetition priming, and measuring changes in the neural response associated with changing the presented stimuli, researchers are attempting to index regions and their processing biases along perceptual, conceptual and response dimensions. This area of research is based on multiple measurement methods from single cell recordings to multi-regional measurements using functional magnetic resonance imaging (fMRI), electroencephalography (EEG) and magnetoencephalography (MEG). Transcranial magnetic stimulation (TMS) has also been used to temporarily 'lesion' (inactivate) specific regions and so get an indication of the necessity of those regions in processing specific dimensions of the presented stimuli. Much of this research has been focused on the visual domain, however auditory and olfactory processes have also been investigated.

== Theories and models ==
Numerous models have been put forward to explain behavioural efficiencies that are gained with repeated presentations of the same or similar stimuli. These are outlined below.

=== Fatigue ===
In this model the attenuation of a neural response is hypothesised to be due to an overall reduction in the amplitude of a neuron's firing. Whether this reduction occurs across all neurons that responded to the initial stimulus or just the critical subset of those that initially responded maximally, is still unclear. However, evidence does suggest that a mechanism like this reduces redundant neural firing and enhances efficiencies in processing in the early visual cortex.

=== Sharpening ===
Along similar lines is the idea that repetition causes the neurons that are less relevant to the representation of the stimulus to stop firing when that stimulus is repeated. In this way the representation is supported by a gradually sparser response, resulting in an adaptive reduction in metabolic requirements and increased efficiencies in information transmission through the neural hierarchy. This could be the result of lateral inhibition within representational levels in a competitive Hebbian learning system, where strong connections get stronger and inhibit the weaker connections. Much of the evidence for this comes from primate studies of the inferotemporal cortex and single cell recordings with long training periods. However, decreases in firing rate over short-term training on repeated stimuli appear to be greatest in those cells that initially respond with the highest activation rate, in line with the fatigue model above.

=== Facilitation ===
The key concept in this model is that information travels faster through the network when the current stimulus representation overlaps with a previous representation, driven by more rapid onset of neural activation with repeated presentations. fMRI studies have been used in an attempt to measure these potential latency differences but the temporal resolution is not very precise and single cell recordings typically do not show shortened latencies to repeated stimuli. Another possible explanation of facilitation is synaptic potentiation within an attractor neural network model where repetition decreases the settling time as the attractor basin deepens and so increases the overall speed of processing.

=== Reduced prediction error/stimulus expectation ===
When a stimulus is repeated top-down feedback modulates the neural response of earlier processing regions, with reduced neural activation and improved behavioural responses reflecting fulfilled expectations. The idea for this comes from predictive coding theories and Bayesian statistics and has some support in fMRI studies manipulating stimulus expectation. However, the results may also reflect the involvement of attention, which seems to have a modulatory effect on the extent of priming elicited.

=== Neural synchrony ===
This theory is based on the idea that because downstream neurons are sensitive to both the firing rates and the timing of those inputs, efficiencies in processing may be gained through synchronised activation. Evidence of synchronisation associated with repeated stimuli include phase locking found between two regions of the cat visual cortex while measuring spike synchronisation for trained compared with novel stimuli and suppressed firing and increased synchrony of spikes with repetition of odour puffs to locust's antennae. Evidence using EEG and MEG suggests that stimulus repetition in humans results in increased synchrony between distinct cortical regions, often the same regions that show reduced local neural activity (see repetition suppression below). In one study, the timing of this across-region synchronization predicted the amount of behavioral facilitation seen with repetition priming, suggestive of a close link between synchrony and behavior.

=== Stimulus-response binding ===
This theory suggests that repetition priming is a result of binding the initial stimulus directly to the response while bypassing the intervening layers of computation. The mechanism mediating this direct binding has not been clarified but several hypotheses have been put forward. One theory explains it as a race between automatic activation of a previous stimulus-response route and the reengagement of the "algorithmic" route and another theory suggests the operation of an "action-trigger" where repeated stimuli trigger the previous response through perceptual or conceptual associations with the original stimulus. In support of this theory is evidence of a response congruency effect, which would be expected from these stimulus-response bindings. The increased synchrony between regions discussed above could be a neural correlate of stimulus-response binding.

== Neural correlates ==
=== Repetition suppression ===
The phenomenon of repetition suppression, a reduction in neural activity when stimuli are repeated, is thought to depend on processing overlaps between repeated items and is generally considered to be the neural correlate of repetition priming. As such it has been used extensively in research investigating the nature of representations across various levels of the visual processing hierarchy. In doing so researchers have found that repetition suppression appears to occur on multiple processing levels; dependent on the stimuli being processed and the processing level at which the experimental manipulation is directed; with reductions in neural activity to repeated stimuli occurring in regions involved with the initial processing of those features. However, care must be taken in interpreting the results of these studies as the relationship between repetition suppression and repetition priming has not been definitively established.

=== Repetition enhancement ===
Although repetition priming is most often associated with neural attenuation for repeated presentation of stimuli, increases in neural responses have also been measured in a number of experimental contexts. For example, when performing mathematical calculations, when repeated stimuli are degraded, in studies involving a backward masking paradigm and when stimuli have no pre-existing associations or meaning.
