= Brian Stableford =

British science fiction writer (1948–2024)

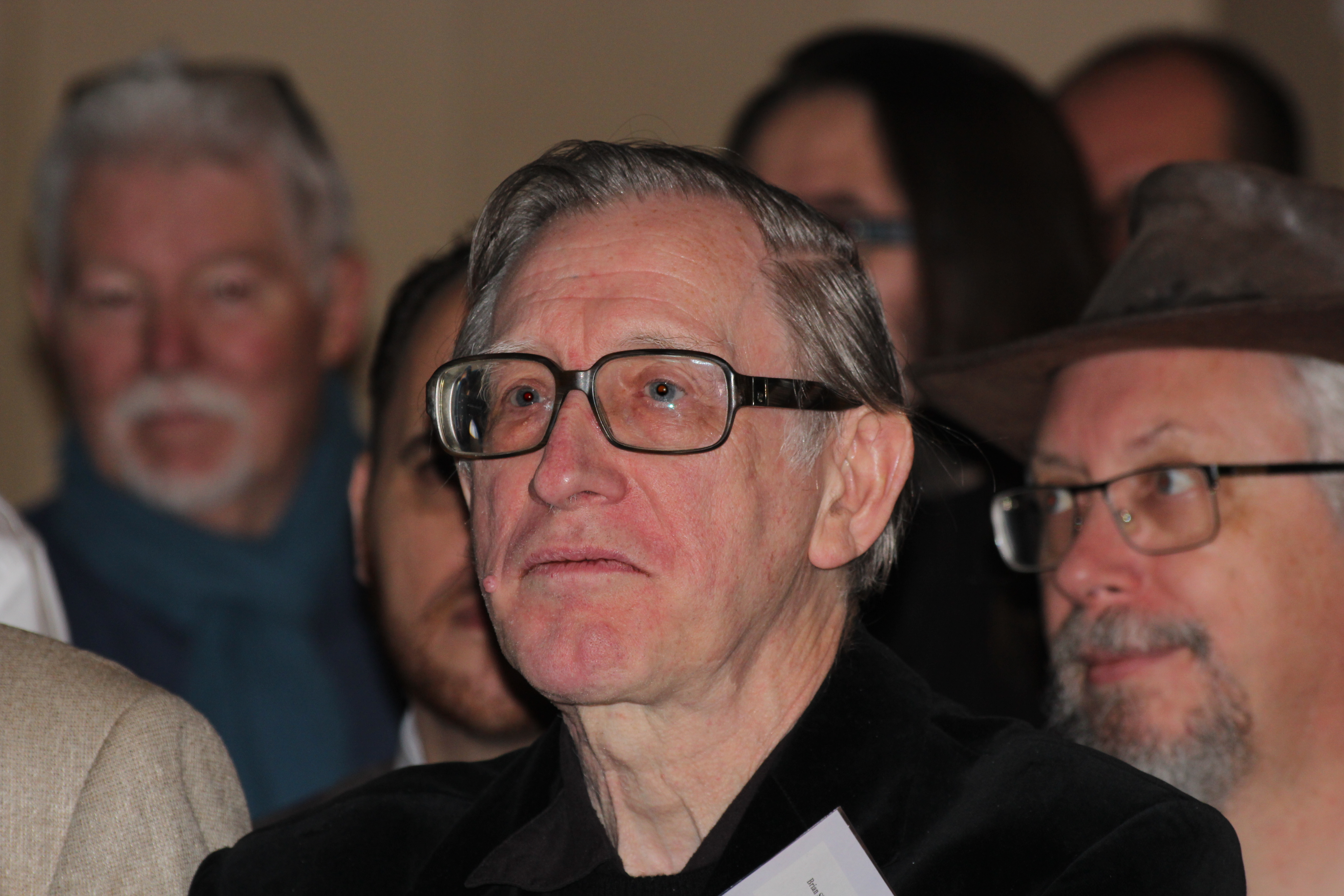
- Stableford in 2016
- Born: 25 July 1948; Shipley, Yorkshire, England
- Died: 24 February 2024 (aged 75); Swansea, Wales
- Education: University of York
- Occupations: Academic, critic and writer
- Writing career
- Pen name: Brian M. Stableford, Brian Craig
- Genre: Science fiction

Brian Michael Stableford (25 July 1948 – 24 February 2024) was a British academic, critic and science fiction writer who published a hundred novels and more than a hundred volumes of translations. His earlier books were published under the name Brian M. Stableford, but later ones dropped the middle initial and appeared under the name Brian Stableford. He also used the pseudonym Brian Craig for some of his very early and late works. The pseudonym derives from the first names of himself and of a school friend from the 1960s, Craig A. Mackintosh, with whom he jointly published some very early work.

== Biography ==
Born in Shipley, Yorkshire, Stableford graduated with a degree in biology from the University of York in 1969 before going on to do postgraduate research in biology and later in sociology. In 1979 he received a PhD with a doctoral thesis on The Sociology of Science Fiction.

Until 1988 he worked as a lecturer in sociology at the University of Reading. He was later a full-time writer and a part-time lecturer at several universities for classes concerning subjects such as creative writing. He was married twice, and had a son and a daughter by his first wife.

He wrote and contributed to numerous reference works, including the last print edition of the Encyclopedia of Science Fiction, wrote books and essays on the history of science fiction, and published more than 200 translations of novels of early French science fiction and fantasy.

Brian Stableford died in Swansea, Wales, on 24 February 2024, at the age of 75.

== Awards and honours ==
- 1985: Eaton Award for Scientific Romance in Britain: 1890–1950.
- 1991: Guest of Honour at CONFUSE 1991 in Linköping, Sweden.
- 1995: Nominee for Hugo Award for Best Novella (for "Les Fleurs du Mal" from Asimov's, Oct 1994).
- 1997: Guest of Honour at SFCD-Convention in Ratzeburg, Germany.
- 1998: Guest of Honour at SF-Days of Northrhine-Westphalia 10 (SFT-NRW10)in Dortmund, Germany.
- 1999: Pilgrim Award.
- 2000: Guest of Honour at NasaCon 2000, Swecon in Stockholm, Sweden.
- 2011: Science Fiction & Fantasy Translation Awards, Special Award.

== Works ==
=== Fiction ===
==== Series ====
===== Dies Irae =====
1. The Days of Glory (Ace 1971)
2. In the Kingdom of the Beasts (Ace 1971)
3. Day of Wrath (Ace 1971)

===== Hooded Swan (a.k.a. Grainger) =====
1. The Halcyon Drift (DAW November 1972 / J. M. Dent 1974); also available as an ebook, listed at 58,069 words
2. Rhapsody in Black (DAW June 1973 / J. M. Dent 1975); also available as an ebook, listed at 51,279 words
3. Promised Land (DAW February 1974 / J. M. Dent September 1975); also available as an ebook, listed at 49,848 words
4. The Paradise Game (DAW June 1974 / J. M. Dent 1976); also available as an ebook, listed at 50,303 words
5. The Fenris Device (DAW December 1974 / Pan 1978); also available as an ebook, listed at 49,782 words
6. Swan Song (DAW May 1975 / Pan 1978)

All six novels are also available in an omnibus volume: Swan Songs (Big Engine April 2002 / SFBC April 2003)

===== Daedalus Mission =====
1. The Florians (DAW September 1976 / Hamlyn 1978)
2. Critical Threshold (DAW February 1977 / Hamlyn 1979)
3. Wildeblood's Empire (DAW October 1977 / Hamlyn 1979)
4. The City of the Sun (DAW May 1978 / Hamlyn 1980)
5. Balance of Power (DAW January 1979 / Hamlyn 1984)
6. The Paradox of the Sets (DAW October 1979)

===== Asgard =====
1. Asgard's Secret (Five Star October 2004); revised and expanded from 2 earlier versions:
  - Journey to the Center (DAW 1982)
  - Journey to the Centre (NEL October 1989)
2. Asgard's Conquerors (Five Star December 2004); revised and expanded from an earlier version:
  - Invaders from the Centre (NEL January 1990)
3. Asgard's Heart (Five Star February 2005); revised and expanded from an earlier version:
  - The Centre Cannot Hold (NEL June 1990)

===== Warhammer =====
1. The Orfeo Trilogy:
  - Zaragoz (GW Books November 1989) (as by "Brian Craig")
  - Plague Daemon (GW Books April 1990) (as by "Brian Craig")
  - Storm Warriors (GW Books March 1991) (as by "Brian Craig")
2. The Wine of Dreams (Black Library October 2000) (as by "Brian Craig")
3. Warhammer 40000: Pawns of Chaos (Black Library April 2001) (as by "Brian Craig")

===== David Lydyard (Werewolves) =====
1. The Werewolves of London (Simon & Schuster UK July 1990)
2. The Angel of Pain (Simon & Schuster UK August 1991)
3. The Carnival of Destruction (Pocket UK October 1994)

===== Dark Future =====
1. Ghost Dancers (GW Books May 1991) (as by "Brian Craig")

===== Genesys =====
1. Serpent's Blood (Legend May 1995)
2. Salamander's Fire (Legend May 1996)
3. Chimera's Cradle (Simon & Schuster UK March 1997)

===== Emortality =====
The first six volumes are considered the main sequence and were published out of series order; preferred reading order shown below is established from the author's introduction to volume 6, The Omega Expedition. This series is also related to, though not always entirely consistent with, the 8 collections and 5 novels subtitled "Tales of the Biotech Revolution", see below.

The term "emortality", intended to indicate near-immortality as opposed to absolute immortality, is acknowledged by Stableford (in the acknowledgments to volume 3, Dark Ararat) to have been coined by Alvin Silverstein in his 1979 book, Conquest of Death.

In the introduction to his 2007 collection, The Tree of Life and Other Tales of the Biotech Revolution, Stableford describes this series as "tracking the potential effects of possible developments in biotechnology on the evolution of global society. [It can be considered] a modified version of the future history mapped out in The Third Millennium: A History of the World AD 2000–3000 (Sidgwick & Jackson 1985, written in collaboration with David Langford).

"The broad sweep of this future history envisages a large-scale economic and ecological collapse in the 21st-century brought about by global warming and other factors, followed by the emergence of a global society designed to accommodate human longevity (although that is not necessarily obvious in stories set in advance of the Crash)."

1. The Cassandra Complex (Tor March 2001); revised and expanded from:
  - "The Magic Bullet" (nv), Interzone #29 1989
2. Inherit the Earth (Tor September 1998); revised and expanded from:
  - "Inherit the Earth" (na), Analog July 1995
3. Dark Ararat (Tor March 2002)
4. Architects of Emortality (Tor September 1999); revised and expanded from:
  - Les Fleurs du Mal (na) Asimov's October 1994; also, see Collection 19, below
5. The Fountains of Youth (Tor May 2000); revised and expanded from:
  - "Mortimer Gray's History of Death" (na), Asimov's April 1995
6. The Omega Expedition (Tor December 2002); revised and expanded from:
  - "And He Not Busy Being Born..." (ss) Interzone #16 Summer 1986
7. The Dragon Man: A Novel of the Future (Borgo Press 2009); a stand-alone "Young Adult" novel; also available as an e-book, listed at 65,401 words

===== Mnemosyne =====
1. The Wayward Muse (Black Coat Press September 2005) ISBN 1-932983-45-7
  - Introduction (in) *
  - "The Secret Exhibition" (nv), Weird Tales Fall 1999; revised here, per the author's introduction
  - "The Incubus of the Rose" (ss), Weird Tales Summer 2000; revised here, per the author's introduction
  - "The Arms of Morpheus" (short novel) *
2. Eurydice's Lament (Black Coat Press Nov. 2015)
3. The Mirror of Dionysius (Black Coat Press Dec. 2016)
4. The Pool of Mnemosyne (Black Coat Press April 2018)

===== The Empire of the Necromancers =====
1. The Shadow of Frankenstein (Black Coat Press December 2008) ISBN 978-1-934543-63-4; a fix-up of the following:
  - "The Grey Men" (na) Tales of the Shadowmen, Volume 2: Gentlemen of the Night, ed. Jean-Marc Lofficier & Randy Lofficier, Black Coat Press 2005
  - "The Child-Stealers" (na) Tales of the Shadowmen, Volume 3: Danse Macabre, ed. Jean-Marc & Randy Lofficier, Black Coat Press 2006
2. Frankenstein and the Vampire Countess (Black Coat Press November 2009) ISBN 978-1-934543-89-4; a fix-up of the following:
  - "The Return of Frankenstein" (na) Tales of the Shadowmen, Volume 4: Lords of Terror, ed. Jean-Marc & Randy Lofficier, Black Coat Press 2008
  - "The Vampire in Paris" (na) Tales of the Shadowmen, Volume 5: The Vampires of Paris, ed. Jean-Marc & Randy Lofficier, Black Coat Press 2009
3. Frankenstein in London (Black Coat Press January 2011) ISBN 978-1-935558-78-1; a fix-up of the following:
  - "Where Zombies Armies Clash By Night" (na) Tales of the Shadowmen, Volume 6: Grand Guignol, ed. Jean-Marc & Randy Lofficier, Black Coat Press 2010
  - "The Necromancers of London" (na) Tales of the Shadowmen, Volume 7: Femmes Fatales, ed. Jean-Marc & Randy Lofficier, Black Coat Press 2011

===== Auguste Dupin =====
1. "The Legacy of Erich Zann" (na), see Collections 21 & 23, below
2. The Mad Trist / Valdemar's Daughter (Borgo Press October 2010); billed as "Wildside Double #10"
  - "Valdemar's Daughter: A Romance of Mesmerism" (na) *; also available as an ebook, listed at 30,405 words
  - "The Mad Trist: A Romance of Bibliomania" (na) *; also available as an ebook, listed at 32,787 words
3. The Quintessence of August: A Romance of Possession (Borgo Press January 2011)
4. The Cthulhu Encryption: A Romance of Piracy (Borgo Press March 2011)
5. Journey to the Core of Creation: A Romance of Evolution (Borgo Press November 2011)
6. Yesterday Never Dies: A Romance of Metempsychosis (Borgo Press January 2013)

===== Morgan's Fork =====
1. Spirits of the Vasty Deep (Snuggly Books March 2018)
2. The Insubstantial Pageant (Snuggly Books Dec. 2018)
3. The Truths of Darkness (Snuggly Books Aug. 2019)

===== Paul Furneret =====
1. The Painter of Spirits (Snuggly Books Oct. 2019)
2. The Quiet Dead (Snuggly Books Oct. 2019)
3. Living With the Dead (Snuggly Books Nov. 2019)

==== Other novels ====
- Cradle of the Sun (Ace Double 1969 / Sidgwick & Jackson October 1969)
- The Blind Worm (Ace Double 1970 / Sidgwick & Jackson March 1970)
- To Challenge Chaos (DAW May 1972)
- The Realms of Tartarus (DAW July 1977); a trilogy of short novels, the first of which is slightly revised from the following:
  - The Face of Heaven (Quartet Books February 1976)
- Man in a Cage (John Day 1975); also available as an e-book, listed at 75,907 words; loosely based on the following story:
  - "Meeting at Eternity" (vi), Proteus #3 1966
- The Mind-Riders (DAW May 1976 / Fontana 1977)
- The Last Days of the Edge of the World (Hutchinson 1978 / Ace September 1985)
- The Walking Shadow (Fontana 1979 / Carroll & Graf July 1985)
- Optiman (DAW October 1980) / a.k.a. War Games (Pan UK July 1981)
- The Castaways of Tanagar (DAW April 1981)
- The Gates of Eden (DAW February 1983)
- The Empire of Fear (Simon & Schuster UK October 1988); revised and expanded from:
  - "The Man Who Loved the Vampire Lady" (nv), F&SF August 1988
- Young Blood (Simon & Schuster UK September 1992); also available as an e-book, listed at 129,274 words
- Firefly: A Novel of the Far Future, (Borgo Press 1994 / Cosmos Books May 2009); also available as an e-book, listed at 52,589 words; revised and expanded from:
  - "Beyond Time's Aegis" (nv), Science Fantasy November 1965 {with Craig A. Mackintosh, as by "Brian Craig"}
- The Hunger and Ecstasy of Vampires (Mark V. Ziesing March 1996) – first published in somewhat abridged form in the following:
  - "The Hunger and Ecstasy of Vampires" (na), Interzone January 1995 (+1)
- Year Zero (Sarob Press June 2000 / Five Star April 2003); a fix-up and expansion of the following 3 stories:
  - "When Molly Met Elvis" (ss), Interzone April 1997 (as by "Francis Amery")
  - "Molly and the Angel" (ss), Interzone July 1999 (as by "Francis Amery")
  - "Molly and the Men in Black" (nv), Interzone September 1999 (as by "Francis Amery")
- The Eleventh Hour (Cosmos Books 2001); also available as an e-book, listed at 106,225 words
- Curse of the Coral Bride (Immanion Press UK November 2004); loosely based on the following:
  - "The Light of Achernar" (nv), The Last Continent: New Tales of Zothique, ed. John Pelan, ShadowLands Press 1999
- Kiss the Goat (Prime Books September 2005)
- The Stones of Camelot (Black Coat Press March 2006) ISBN 1-932983-69-4; revised and expanded from:
  - "The Architect of Worlds" (na), Camelot Fantastic, ed. Lawrence Schimel & Martin H. Greenberg, DAW July 1998
- Streaking: A Novel of Probability (PS Publishing June 2006 / Borgo Press September 2011)
- The New Faust at the Tragicomique (Black Coat Press April 2007) ISBN 978-1-932983-91-3
- Sherlock Holmes and the Vampires of Eternity (Black Coat Press January 2009) ISBN 978-1-934543-06-1; book version of the following linked novellas:
  - "The Hunger and Ecstasy of Vampires" (na), Interzone January 1995 (+1) / (text restored) Mark V. Ziesing 1996, see above
  - "The Black Blood of the Dead" (na), Interzone January 1997 (+1)
  - "The Gateway of Eternity" (na), Interzone January 1999 (+1)
- The Moment of Truth, (Borgo Press March 2009); loosely based on the following:
  - "The Face of an Angel" (nv), Leviathan 3, ed. Forrest Aguirre & Jeff VanderMeer, Ministry of Whimsy 2002
- Prelude to Eternity: A Romance of the First Time Machine (Borgo Press August 2009)
- The World Beyond: A Sequel to S. Fowler Wright's The World Below (Borgo Press September 2009)
- Alien Abduction: The Wiltshire Revelations (Borgo Press September 2009); "A Comedy of Aliens"
- Luscinia: A Romance of Nightingales and Roses (Borgo Press August 2010); also available as an e-book, listed at 62,555 words
- The Plurality of Worlds: A 16th-century Space Opera (Borgo Press 2010); book version of the following linked novellas:
  - "The Ethership" (na), Asimov's August 2006 (as "The Plurality of Worlds")
  - "Doctor Muffet's Island" (na), Asimov's March 2007
  - "The Philosopher's Stone" (na), Asimov's July 2008
  - "The Great Armada" (na), Asimov's April/May 2009; text slightly restored here
- Zombies Don't Cry: A Tale of the Biotech Revolution (Borgo Press February 2011)
- Xeno's Paradox: A Tale of the Biotech Revolution (Borgo Press February 2011) (sequel to "Hidden Agendas", see Collection 9)
- Nature's Shift: A Tale of the Biotech Revolution (Borgo Press September 2011); loosely based on the following:
  - "The Growth of the House of Usher" (nv), Interzone #24 1988
- Echoes of Eternity (Chambrion Books Feb. 2016)
- Vampires of Atlantis: A Love Story (Wildside Press April 2016); revised and expanded from the following:
  - "Sheena" (na), The Vampire Sextette, ed. Marvin Kaye, SFBC 2000 / Ace 2002
- The Darkling Wood: A Scientific Fantasy (Wildside Press May 2016); revised and expanded from the following:
  - "Tenebrio" (nv), Vanishing Acts, ed. Ellen Datlow, Tor 2000
- The Devil in Detail (Wildside Press May 2016); loosely based on the following related stories:
  - "Chacun sa Goule" (biography & introduction), Dancing with the Dark, ed. Stephen Jones, Vista 1997
  - "The Haunted Bookshop" (nv), Dark Terrors 5: The Gollancz Book of Horror, ed. Stephen Jones & David Sutton, Gollancz UK 2000
  - "Beyond Bliss" (nv), The Haunted Bookshop and Other Apparitions, Borgo Press Sep. 2007
- Portals of Paradise (Wildside Press Nov. 2016)
- Tangled Web of Time (Wildside Press Nov. 2016)
- Further Beyond: A Lovecraftian Science Fiction Novel (Wildside Press Aug. 2017); revised and expanded from the following:
  - "Further Beyond" (na), Black Wings III, ed. S. T. Joshi, PS Publishing Feb. 2014
- The Death of Broceliande: A Tale of Faery (Wildside Press Feb. 2018); revised and expanded from the following:
  - "Chanterelle" (nv), Black Heart, Ivory Bones, ed. Ellen Datlow & Terri Windling, Avon 2000
- The Alchemy of Blood (Wildside Press May 2018); revised and expanded from the following:
  - "The Path of Progress" (nv/na), The Return of the Djinn and Other Black Melodramas, Borgo Press Aug. 2009
- The Tyranny of the Word (Black Coat Press Sep. 2019)
- The Revelations of Time and Space (Snuggly Books June 2020)
- The Elusive Shadows: A Tale of the Biotech Revolution (Snuggly Books Oct. 2020)
- Meat on the Bone (Snuggly Books May 2021)

==== Chapbooks ====
- The Cosmic Perspective/Custer's Last Stand (Chrim Drumm 1985); collection of 2 original novelettes
- Slumming in Voodooland (Pulphouse Short Story Paperback #26 July 1991); an original short story
- The Innsmouth Heritage (Necronomicon Press March 1992); an original short story, inspired by H. P. Lovecraft's fiction
- Fables and Fantasies (Necronomicon Press October 1996); a collection:
  - "Three Versions of a Fable" (vi), Bats and Red Velvet #14 1995
  - "Nephthys" (ss), Peeping Tom #13 1994
  - "The Annual Conference of the Prophets of Atlantis" (vi), Reminiscon 40 Souvenir Programme 1992
  - "The Requiem Masque" (ss), Albedo One #3 1993
  - "Kalamada's Blessing" (vi), Scheherazade #8 1993
  - "Aphrodite and the Ring" (ss), Scheherazade #11 1995
  - "How the Dragons Yetzirah and Alziluth Lost the Knowledge of a Million Lifetimes" (vi) *; revised from Star Roots #1 1989
  - "The Shepherd's Daughter" (ss), Fear! September 1990
  - "The Sleeping Soul" (vi) *
  - "The Dream" (vi) *

==== Collections ====
Stableford's prodigious output of short fiction allowed him to put together the following 22 collections with only one case of overlapping stories between them: "The Legacy of Erich Zann" in both Collections 20 & 22. Collections 1, 3, 6, 8, 13, 16, 19 & 21 are subtitled "Tales of the Biotech Revolution" and are related to, though not always entirely consistent with, his "Emortality" novels, see above.

1. Sexual Chemistry: Sardonic Tales of the Genetic Revolution (Simon & Schuster UK February 1991); reprinted, sans the concluding article, as Sexual Chemistry and Other Tales of the Biotech Revolution (Borgo Press 2012)
  - Introduction (in) *
  - "Bedside Conversations" (ss), Asimov's December 1990
  - "Sexual Chemistry" (nv), Interzone #20 1987 (a.k.a. "A Career in Sexual Chemistry")
  - "Cinderella's Sisters" (ss), The Gate #1 1989
  - "The Magic Bullet" (nv), Interzone #29 1989 (later expanded into The Cassandra Complex, see above)
  - "The Invertebrate Man" (nv), Interzone #39 1990
  - "The Furniture of Life's Ambition" (ss/nv), Zenith 2, ed. David S. Garnett, Orbit UK 1990
  - "The Fury That Hell Withheld" (ss/nv), Interzone #35 1990
  - "The Engineer and the Executioner" (ss), Amazing May 1975; revised
  - "The Growth of the House of Usher" (nv), Interzone #24 1988 (later expanded into Nature's Shift: A Tale of the Biotech Revolution, see above)
  - "And He Not Busy Being Born..." (ss), Interzone #16 1986 (later expanded into The Omega Expedition, see above)
  - "Mankind in the Third Millennium" (article), Social Biology and Human Affairs v54 #1 1988; originally published in Japanese in Japan Research and Technology #249 1988
2. Complications and Other Stories (Cosmos Books September 2003)
  - Introduction (in) *
  - "Complications" (nv), Amazing February 1992
  - "Alternate Worlds" (ss), Interzone #38 1990 (a.k.a. "Minimoments")
  - "The Flowers of the Forest" (ss), Amazing June 1993
  - "Layers of Meaning" (ss), Interzone #21 1987
  - "The Oedipus Effect" (nv), Temps Volume 1, ed. Neil Gaiman & Alex Stewart, Roc UK 1991
  - "Sortilege and Serendipity" (nv), Euro Temps, ed. Alex Stewart, Roc UK 1992; sequel to "The Oedipus Effect"
  - "Skinned Alive" (ss), Weekend's Fiction Extra September 1978
  - "Taken for a Ride" (ss), Science Fiction Age March 1994
  - "Virtuous Reality" (ss), Interzone January 1992
  - "Wildland" (ss), Arrows of Eros, ed. Alex Stewart, NEL 1989
3. Designer Genes: Tales of the Biotech Revolution (Five Star March 2004)
  - Introduction (in) *
  - "What Can Chloë Want?" (ss), Asimov's March 1994
  - "The Invisible Worm" (nv), F&SF September 1991
  - "The Age of Innocence" (ss), Asimov's June 1995
  - "Snowball in Hell" (nv), Analog December 2000
  - "The Last Supper" (ss), Science Fiction Age March 2000
  - "The Facts of Life" (nv), Asimov's September 1993
  - "Hot Blood" (ss), Asimov's September 2002
  - "The House of Mourning" (ss), Off-Limits, ed. Ellen Datlow, St. Martin's 1996
  - "Another Branch of the Family Tree" (nv), Asimov's July 1999
  - "The Milk of Human Kindness" (ss), Analog March 2001
  - "The Pipes of Pan" (nv), F&SF June 1997; read online
4. Salomé and Other Decadent Fantasies (Cosmos Books May 2004)
  - Introduction (in) *
  - "Salomé" (ss), The Dedalus Book of Femmes Fatales, ed. Brian M. Stableford, Dedalus 1992
  - "O for a Fiery Gloom and Thee" (ss), Sirens and Other Daemon Lovers, ed. Ellen Datlow & Terri Windling, HarperPrism 1998
  - "The Last Worshipper of Proteus" (ss), Beyond Fantasy & Science Fiction #2 1995
  - "The Evil That Men Do" (nv), Realms of Fantasy August 1995
  - "Ebony Eyes" (vi), Horrors! 365 Scary Stories, ed. Stefan R. Dziemianowicz, Robert Weinberg & Martin H. Greenberg, Barnes & Noble 1998 (as by "Francis Amery")
  - "The Fisherman's Child" (ss), Penny Dreadful April 1998
  - "The Storyteller's Tale" (ss), The Anthology of Fantasy & the Supernatural, ed. Stephen Jones & David Sutton, Tiger 1994
  - "The Unluckiest Thief" (ss), Interzone June 1992
  - "The Light of Achernar" (nv), The Last Continent: New Tales of Zothique, ed. John Pelan, ShadowLands Press 1999 (later formed loose basis for the novel Curse of the Coral Bride, see above)
  - "The Mandrake Garden" (ss), F&SF July 2000
  - "Chanterelle" (nv), Black Heart, Ivory Bones, ed. Ellen Datlow & Terri Windling, Avon 2000
5. Sheena and Other Gothic Tales (Immanion Press May 2006), also available as an e-book, approximately 90,000 words
  - Introduction (in) *
  - "Rose, Crowned with Thorns" (nv), White of the Moon: New Tales of Madness and Dread, ed. Stephen Jones, Pumpkin Books 1999
  - "Rent" (ss), Weird Tales Fall 1998
  - "Tenebrio" (nv), Vanishing Acts, ed. Ellen Datlow, Tor 2000 (later expanded into the novel The Darkling Wood, see above)
  - "Behind the Wheel" (ss), Dark Voices 2, ed. David Sutton & Stephen Jones, Pan UK 1990
  - "Innocent Blood" (nv), Tales of the Wandering Jew, ed. Brian Stableford, Dedalus UK 1991
  - "Emptiness" (ss), Dreams of Decadence Spring 2001 / Infinity Plus Two, ed. Keith Brooke & Nick Gevers, PS Publishing UK 2003; originally published in French in De Sang d'Encre, ed. Lea Silhol, 1999
  - "The Woman in the Mirror" (ss), The Dedalus Book of Femmes Fatales, ed. Brian Stableford, Dedalus UK 1992; (as by "Brian Craig")
  - "Regression" (nv), Asimov's April 2000
  - "Heartbreaker" (ss), Million #2 1991
  - "Sheena" (na), The Vampire Sextette, ed. Marvin Kaye, SFBC 2000 / Ace 2002; text restored, per the author's introduction (later expanded into the novel Vampires of Atlantis, see above)
6. The Cure for Love and Other Tales of the Biotech Revolution (Borgo Press June 2007)
  - Introduction (in) *
  - "The Cure for Love" (nv), Asimov's mid-December 1993
  - "Ashes and Tombstones" (ss), Moon Shots, ed. Peter Crowther, DAW 1999
  - "Slumming in Voodooland" (nv), Pulphouse 1991
  - "The Color of Envy" (nv), Asimov's May 2001
  - "The Lady-Killer, as Observed from a Safe Distance" (nv), Asimov's August 2000
  - "Busy Dying" (nv), F&SF February 1994
  - "The Man Who Invented Good Taste" (ss), Interzone March 1991
  - "The Road to Hell" (nv), Interzone July 1995
  - "The Scream" (nv), Asimov's July 1994
7. The Haunted Bookshop and Other Apparitions (Borgo Press September 2007)
  - Introduction (in) *
  - "Seers" (ss), Gothic Ghosts, ed. Wendy Webb & Charles L. Grant, Tor 1997
  - "O Goat-Foot God of Arcady!" (ss), The Silver Web #15 2002
  - Chacun sa Goule (biography & introduction) Dancing with the Dark, ed. Stephen Jones, Vista 1997 (this and the following 2 stories later formed the loose basis for novel The Devil in Detail, see above)
  - "The Haunted Bookshop" (nv), Dark Terrors 5: The Gollancz Book of Horror, ed. Stephen Jones & David Sutton, Gollancz UK 2000
  - "Beyond Bliss" (nv) *; sequel to "The Haunted Bookshop"
  - "All You Inherit" (ss/nv), Taps and Sighs, ed. Peter Crowther, Subterranean Press 2000
  - "The Will" (ss), Dark Fantasies, ed. Chris Morgan, Legend UK 1989
  - "Danny's Inferno" (ss), Albedo One #32 2007
  - "Can't Live Without You" (ss/nv), Oceans of the Mind Winter 2001
  - "Community Service" (nv), Terra Incognita Spring 1997
  - "Denial" (ss) *
8. The Tree of Life and Other Tales of the Biotech Revolution (Borgo Press September 2007)
  - Introduction (in) *
  - "The Tree of Life" (nv), Asimov's September 1994
  - "The Skin Trade" (ss), Asimov's November 1995
  - "Out of Touch" (nv), Asimov's October 1995
  - "Skin Deep" (nv), Amazing October 1991
  - "Carriers" (ss/nv), Asimov's July 1993
  - "Rogue Terminator" (nv), Asimov's April 2001
  - "Home Front" (ss), Science Fiction: The DAW 30th Anniversary, ed. Sheila E. Gilbert & Elizabeth R. Wollheim, DAW 2002
  - "Hidden Agendas" (nv/na), Asimov's September 1999 (sequel is Xeno's Paradox: A Tale of the Biotech Revolution, see above)
9. An Oasis of Horror: Decadent Tales and Contes Cruels (Borgo Press March 2008)
  - Introduction (in) *
  - "An Oasis of Horror" (ss), Infinity Plus September 2006; read online
  - "Justice" (ss), Far Point #1 1991
  - "The Copper Cauldron" (nv) *
  - "Nobody Else to Blame" (ss), Redsine #7 January 2002
  - "Heartbeat" (vi), Horrors! 365 Scary Stories, ed. Stefan R. Dziemianowicz, Robert Weinberg & Martin H. Greenberg, Barnes & Noble 1998
  - "Upon the Gallows-Tree" (ss), Narrow Houses, ed. Peter Crowther, Little Brown UK 1992
  - "The Devil's Men" (ss), 100 Wicked Little Witch Stories, ed. Stefan Dziemianowicz, Robert Weinberg & Martin H. Greenberg, Barnes & Noble 1995
  - "The Elixir of Youth" (nv), Weird Tales #341 August/September 2006; originally appeared in French in Asphodale #4 2003; read online
  - "The Lamia's Soliloquy" (vi), Horrors! 365 Scary Stories, ed. Stefan R. Dziemianowicz, Robert Weinberg & Martin H. Greenberg, Barnes & Noble 1998
  - "And the Hunter Home From the Hill" (ss/nv) *
  - "The Riddle of the Sphinx" (vi), Horrors! 365 Scary Stories, ed. Stefan R. Dziemianowicz, Robert Weinberg & Martin H. Greenberg, Barnes & Noble 1998
  - "My Mother, the Hag" (ss), Tales of the Round Table, ed. Mike Astley, Past Times 1997
  - "The Devil's Comedy" (nv), Phantoms of Venice, ed. David Sutton, Shadow 2001
  - "The Power of Prayer" (ss), Paradox #1 Spring 2003
10. The Gardens of Tantalus and Other Delusions (Borgo Press March 2008); also available as an e-book, listed at 67,533 words
  - Introduction (in) *
  - "The Gardens of Tantalus" (nv), Classical Whodunnits, ed. Mike Astley, Past Times 1996
  - "The Lost Romance" (ss), Chronicles of the Holy Grail, ed. Mike Astley, Carroll & Graf 1996
  - "Lucifer's Comet" (ss), Interzone September 1996 (as by "Francis Amery")
  - "The Miracle of Zunderburg" (ss), Redsine #4 February 2001
  - "The Cult of Selene" (ss), Albedo One #14 1997
  - "Ice and Fire" (ss), Albedo One #18 1998
  - "Self-Sacrifice" (ss), Interzone December 1991 (as by "Francis Amery")
  - "To the Bad" (ss), Weerde: Book 1, ed. Mary Gentle & Roz Kaveney, Roc UK 1992
  - "Riding the Tiger" (nv), Interzone February 1993 (book's introduction explains that this was originally written as a sequel to "To the Bad")
  - "Curiouser and Curiouser: A Kitchen Sink Drama, by Carol Lewis" (ss), Redsine #6 June 2001
  - "Quality Control" (nv), The Mammoth Book of Dracula, ed. Stephen Jones, Robinson 1997
  - "Worse Than the Disease" (ss), Interzone November 1996
11. The Innsmouth Heritage and Other Sequels (Borgo Press March 2009)
  - Introduction (in) *
  - "The Innsmouth Heritage" (ss), Necronomicon Press 1992
  - "The Picture" (vi), The Seventh Seal #2 2000 / Redsine #2 October 2000 / Here and Now Autumn 2004
  - "The Temptation of Saint Anthony" (ss), The Secret History of Vampires, ed. Darrell Schweitzer, DAW 2007
  - "The Ugly Cygnet, by Hans Realist Andersen" (vi), The Seventh Seal #4 2001
  - "Art in the Blood" (ss/nv), Shadows Over Baker Street, ed. John Pelan & Michael Reeves, Del Rey 2003
  - "Mr Brimstone and Dr. Treacle" (vi), Naked Truth #6 1996 (as by "Francis Amery")
  - "Jehan Thun's Quest" (nv), The Mammoth Book of New Jules Verne Adventures, ed. Mike Astley & Eric Brown, Robinson 2005
  - "The Immortals of Atlantis" (ss), disLocations, ed. Ian Whates, NewCon Press 2007
  - "Between the Chapters" (ss) *
  - "Three Versions of a Fable" (vi), Bats and Red Velvet #14 1995
  - "The Titan Unwrecked; or, Futility Revisited" (nv/na), Tales of the Shadowmen 1: The Modern Babylon, ed. Jean-Marc & Randy Lofficier, Black Coat Press 2005
12. Changelings and Other Metamorphic Tales (Borgo Press March 2009)
  - Introduction (in) *
  - "Changelings" (ss), Interzone #85 July 1994
  - "Coming to Terms with the Great Plague" (ss), Omni Online December 1997 (a.k.a. "Coming to Grips with the Great Plague")
  - "Inside Out" (ss/nv), Asimov's March 1997
  - "After the Stone Age" (ss), BBC website March 2004; read original version online
  - "The Oracle" (nv), Asimov's May 1999
  - "The Tour" (ss), Science Fiction Age January 1998
  - "Victims" (ss), Science Fiction Age January 2000
  - "The Serpent" (ss), Interzone September 1995
  - "Tread Softly" (ss), Interzone March 2002
  - "Degrees of Separation (with John B. Ford)" (ss), The Evil Entwines, John B. Ford et al., Hardcastle 2002
13. In the Flesh and Other Tales of the Biotech Revolution (Borgo Press March 2009)
  - Introduction (in) *
  - "In the Flesh" (nv), Future Histories, ed. Stephen McClelland, Horizon House UK 1997; read online
  - "A Chip Off the Old Block" (nv), Postscripts Summer 2004
  - "Taking the Piss" (nv), Asimov's June 2002 / Future Crimes, ed. Jack Dann & Gardner Dozois, Ace 2003
  - "Another Bad Day in Bedlam" (ss), Christmas Forever, ed. David G. Hartwell, Tor 1993
  - "Dr. Prospero and the Snake Lady" (ss/nv), Millennium 3001, ed. Russell Davis & Martin H. Greenberg, DAW 2006
  - "Casualty" (nv), Future Weapons of War, ed. Joe Haldeman & Martin H. Greenberg, Baen March 2007
  - "The Trial" (nv), Asimov's July 2007
  - "The Gift of the Magi" (ss), Interzone #122 August 1997
  - "The Incredible Whelk" (ss), Ludd's Mill #16/17 Winter 1980; revised
  - "The Piebald Plumber of Haemlin" (ss), Interzone April 1998
14. The Cosmic Perspective and Other Black Comedies (Borgo Press July 2009); also available as an e-book, listed at 62,851 words
  - Introduction (in) *
  - "The Cosmic Perspective" (nv), The Cosmic Perspective/Custer's Last Stand, Drumm 1985
  - "The Haunted Nursery" (vi), Horrors! 365 Scary Stories, ed. Stefan R. Dziemianowicz, Robert Weinberg & Martin H. Greenberg, Barnes & Noble 1998
  - "The Phantom of Teirbrun" (na) *
  - "Custer's Last Stand" (nv), The Cosmic Perspective/Custer's Last Stand, Drumm 1985
  - "The Requiem Masque" (ss), Albedo One #3 1993
  - "Meat on the Bone" (nv) *
  - "Murphy's Grail" (ss), Redsine #4 February 2001
  - "Brief Encounter in the Smoking Area" (ss), The Interpreter's House #16 February 2001
  - "Fans from Hell" (ss), The Steel Caves December 2000
  - "The Annual Conference of the Prophets of Atlantis" (vi), Reminiscon 40 Souvenir Programme 1992
15. The Best of Both Worlds and Other Ambiguous Tales (Borgo Press August 2009)
  - Introduction (in) *
  - "The Best of Both Worlds" (ss), Postscripts Summer 2008
  - "The Highway Code" (ss), We Think, Therefore, We Are, ed. Peter Crowther, DAW 2009
  - "Captain Fagan Died Alone" (ss), The DAW Science Fiction Reader, ed. Donald A. Wollheim, DAW 1976 (falls into the milieu of novel To Challenge Chaos, see above)
  - "The Face of an Angel" (nv), Leviathan 3, ed. Forrest Aguirre & Jeff VanderMeer, Ministry of Whimsy 2002 (later formed loose basis for novel The Moment of Truth, see above)
  - Verstehen (ss) ConFuse '91 program book (Kongressbok) 1991 / Odyssey September 1997; originally published in German in Pilger Dürch Raum und Zeit, ed. Wilfert, Goldmann 1982
  - "The Bad Seed" (nv), Interzone April 1994
  - "The Man Who Came Back" (vi), sf Impulse October 1966
  - "Appearances" (na) *
16. The Great Chain of Being and Other Tales of the Biotech Revolution (Borgo Press August 2009); also available as an e-book, listed at 69,250 words
  - Introduction (in) *
  - "Following the Pharmers" (nv), Asimov's March 2008
  - "The Unkindness of Ravens" (ss), Interzone #90 December 1994
  - "The Great Chain of Being" (ss), Future Americas, ed. John Helfers & Martin H. Greenberg, DAW 2008
  - "Sleepwalker" (vi), Interzone #105 March 1996
  - "The Beauty Contest" (nv) *
  - "Burned Out" (nv), Interzone #70 April 1993
  - "Inherit the Earth" (na), Analog July 1995 (later expanded into Inherit the Earth, see above)
17. Beyond the Colors of Darkness and Other Exotica (Borgo Press August 2009); also available as an e-book, listed at 66,814 words
  - Introduction (in) *
  - "Beyond the Colors of Darkness" (ss) *
  - "An Offer of Oblivion" (ss), Amazing October 1974; revised
  - "Enlightenment" (nv) *
  - "The Dragons Alziluth and Yetzirah" (vi), Fables and Fantasies, Necronomicon Press 1996 (revised from Star Roots #1 1989; a.k.a. "How the Dragons Alziluth and Yetzirah Lost the Knowledge of a Million Lifetimes")
  - "A Saint's Progress" (ss) *
  - Mens Sana in Corpore Sano (ss) Violent Spectres #2 1995
  - "Black Nectar" (nv) *
  - "Nephthys" (ss), Peeping Tom #13 1994
  - "Plastic Man" (vi) *; originally appeared in Swedish in Norcon 99 program book, 1999
  - "Aphrodite and the Ring" (ss), Scheherazade #11 1995 (a.k.a. "Aphrodite's Ring")
  - Danse Macabre (na) *
18. The Return of the Djinn and Other Black Melodramas (Borgo Press August 2009); pre-publication catalogs listed the title of this collection as The Path of Progress and Other Black Melodramas
  - Introduction (in) *
  - "The Path of Progress" (nv/na) *
  - "Kalamada's Blessing" (vi), Scheherazade #8 1993
  - "The Shepherd's Daughter" (ss), Fear! September 1990
  - "Shadows of the Past" (nv) *
  - "Reconstruction" (vi), Cold Cuts II, ed. Paul Lewis & Steve Lockley, Alun Books 1994
  - "The Return of the Djinn" (na) *
19. Le Fleurs du Mal / The Undead (Borgo Press August 2010); billed as "Wildside Double #4"
  - Author's Note [to Les Fleurs du Mal] (in) *
  - "Le Fleurs du Mal: A Tale of the Biotech Revolution" (na), Asimov's October 1994; text corrected here, per the author's introduction: "...I eventually decided to finish the novel version of Les Fleurs du Mal anyway, and completed it in 1992. I wrote the story to what seemed its natural length (68,000 words) but could not sell it...I decided to cut the text drastically and attempt to sell an abridged version of the story to one or other of the sf magazines as a novella. The present text is the 29,000-word result of that cut, although Gardner Dozois—who bought it for publication in the October 1994 issue of Asimov's Science Fiction—insisted on cutting out the gratuitous car chase, thus reducing the published version to 27,000 words."; later expanded into the novel Architects of Emortality, see above
  - "The Undead: A Tale of the Biotech Revolution" (short novel) *; also available as an ebook, listed at 44,110 words
20. The Womb of Time (Perilous Press January 2011)
  - "The Womb of Time" (short novel) *
  - "The Legacy of Erich Zann" (na) *; first story in the Auguste Dupin series, see above
21. The Golden Fleece and Other Tales of the Biotech Revolution (Borgo Press March 2012)
  - Introduction (in) *
  - "The Golden Fleece" (na) *
  - "Some Like It Hot" (nv), Asimov's December 2009
  - "Alfonso the Wise" (ss), Interzone #105 March 1996 Pas by "Frances Amery")
  - "Next to Godliness" (ss/nv), Celebration: Commemorating the 50th Anniversary of the British Science Fiction Association, ed. Ian Whates, NewCon Press March 2008; text restored
  - "Mortimer Gray's History of Death" (na), Asimov's April 1995 (later expanded into The Fountains of Youth, see above)
22. The Legacy of Erich Zann and Other Tales of the Cthulhu Mythos (Borgo Press April 2012)
  - Introduction (in) *
  - "The Legacy of Erich Zann" (na), The Womb of Time, Perilous Press January 2011; first story in the Auguste Dupin series, see above
  - "The Truth about Pickman" (ss), Black Wings: New Tales of Lovecraftian Horror, ed. S. T. Joshi, PS Publishing April 2010
  - "The Holocaust of Ecstasy" (ss), Cthulhu's Reign, ed. Darrell Schweitzer, DAW April 2010
  - "The Seeds from the Mountains of Madness" (na) *

==== Uncollected short fiction ====
- "The Fertile Imagination". Andromeda Spaceways Inflight Magazine. 41: 99–108. 2009.

=== As translator (predominantly French into English) ===
- The Angels of Perversity (1992) by Rémy de Gourmont (as Francis Amery), Dedalus
- Monsieur de Phocas (1994) by Jean Lorrain (as Francis Amery), Dedalus
- Vampire City (1999) (La Ville Vampire by Paul Féval, père (1874)) ISBN 0-9740711-6-1
- Knightshade (2001) (Le Chevalier Ténèbre by Paul Féval (1860)) ISBN 0-9740711-4-5
- Lumen (2002) (Lumen by Camille Flammarion (1867)) ISBN 0-8195-6567-9
- Nightmares of an Ether-Drinker (Tartarus Press 2002) (Sensations et Souvenirs by Jean Lorrain (1895)) ISBN 1-872621-65-1
- The Vampire Countess (2003) (La Vampire by Paul Féval (1865)) ISBN 0-9740711-5-3
- The Scaffold (2004) (original collection of previously untranslated stories from Histoires Insolites, L'Amour Suprême and Nouveaux Contes Cruels by Auguste Villiers de l'Isle-Adam (1883)) ISBN 1-932983-01-5
- The Vampire Soul (2004) (original collection of previously untranslated stories from Tribulat Bonhomet, L'Amour Suprême and Nouveaux Contes Cruels by Auguste Villiers de l'Isle-Adam (1887)) ISBN 1-932983-02-3
- The Wandering Jew's Daughter (2005) (La Fille du Juif Errant by Paul Féval (1863)) ISBN 1-932983-30-9
- John Devil (2005) (Jean Diable by Paul Féval (1861)) ISBN 1-932983-15-5
- The Black Coats: 'Salem Street (2005) (La Rue de Jérusalem by Paul Féval (1868)) ISBN 1-932983-46-5
- Revenants (2006) (Le Livre des Mystères by Paul Féval (1852)) ISBN 1-932983-70-8
- The Black Coats: The Invisible Weapon (2006) (L'Arme Invisible by Paul Féval (1869)) ISBN 1-932983-80-5
- News from the Moon: Nine French proto-science fiction stories from 1768 to 1902 (2007) ISBN 978-1-932983-89-0
- Felifax the Tiger-Man (2007) (Félifax by Paul Féval, fils (1929)) ISBN 978-1-932983-88-3
- The Nyctalope vs. Lucifer (2007) (Lucifer by Jean de La Hire (1921)) ISBN 978-1-932983-98-2
- Anne of the Isles (2007) (Contes de Bretagne by Paul Féval (1844)) ISBN 978-1-932983-92-0
- The Vampire and the Devil's Son (2007) (La Baronne Trépassée by Pierre Alexis Ponson du Terrail (1852)) ISBN 978-1-932983-55-5
- Captain Vampire (2007) (Le Capitaine Vampire by Marie Nizet (1879)) ISBN 978-1-934543-01-6
- The Vampires of Mars (2008) (Le Prisonnier de la Planète Mars and La Guerre des Vampires by Gustave Le Rouge (1908)) ISBN 978-1-934543-30-6
- The Black Coats: The Parisian Jungle (2008) (Les Habits Noirs by Paul Féval (1863)) ISBN 978-1-934543-03-0
- The People of the Pole (2008) (Le Peuple du Pôle by Charles Derennes (1907)) ISBN 978-1-934543-39-9
- The Nyctalope on Mars (2008) (Le Mystère des XV by Jean de La Hire (1910)) ISBN 978-1-934543-46-7
- An Inhabitant of the Planet Mars (2008) (Un habitant de la planète Mars by Henri de Parville (1864)) ISBN 978-1-934543-45-0
- The Novel of the Future (2008) (Le Roman de l'avenir by Félix Bodin (1834)) ISBN 978-1-934543-44-3
- The Clock of the Centuries (2008) (L'horloge des siècles by Albert Robida (1902)) ISBN 978-1-934543-13-9
- The Martian Epic (2008) (Les Titans du Ciel & L'Agonie de la Terre by Octave Joncquel & Theo Varlet (1921)) ISBN 978-1-934543-41-2
- The Black Coats: The Companions of the Treasure (2008) (Les Companions du Trésor by Paul Féval (1872)) ISBN 978-1-934543-26-9
- Panic in Paris (2009) (L'effrayante aventure by Jules Lermina (1910)) ISBN 978-1-934543-83-2
- Journey to the Land of the Fourth Dimension (2009) (Voyage au pays de la quatrième dimension by Gaston de Pawlowski (1912)) ISBN 978-1-934543-37-5
- Enter the Nyctalope (2009) (L'Assassinat du Nyctalope by Jean de La Hire (1933)) ISBN 978-1-934543-99-3
- The Extraordinary Adventures of a Russian Scientist Across the Solar System (2 volumes) (2009) (Les Extraordinaires Aventures d'un Savant Russe by Georges Le Faure and Henri de Graffigny (1888–96)) ISBN 978-1-934543-81-8 & ISBN 978-1-934543-82-5
- Ignis: The Central Fire (2009) (Ignis by Comte Didier de Chousy (1883)) ISBN 978-1-934543-88-7
- Sâr Dubnotal vs. Jack the Ripper (2009) (by Anonymous (1909)) ISBN 978-1-934543-94-8
- Ortog (2009) (Ortog by Kurt Steiner (1960 & 1969)) ISBN 978-1-935558-28-6
- The Black Coats: Heart of Steel (2009) (Coeur d'Acier by Paul Féval (1865)) ISBN 978-1-935558-05-7
- The Germans on Venus and Other Scientific Romances (2009), Black Coat Press
- Doctor Lerne (2010) (Le Docteur Lerne by Maurice Renard (1908)) ISBN 978-1-935558-15-6
- A Man Among the Microbes (2010) (Un Homme chez les Microbes by Maurice Renard (1908)) ISBN 978-1-935558-16-3
- The Navigators of Space (2010) (Les Navigateurs de l'Infini by J.-H. Rosny aîné (1925)) ISBN 978-1-935558-35-4
- Mysteryville (2010) (Mystère-Ville by Jules Lermina (1905)) ISBN 978-1-935558-27-9
- The Blue Peril (2010) (Le Péril Bleu by Maurice Renard (1911)) ISBN 978-1-935558-17-0
- The World of the Variants (2010) (Dans le Monde des Variants by J.-H. Rosny aîné (1939)) ISBN 978-1-935558-36-1
- The Terror of Madame Atomos (2010) (La Terrible Madame Atomos by André Caroff (1964)) ISBN 978-1-935558-41-5
- The Doctored Man (2010) (L'Homme Truqué by Maurice Renard (1921)) ISBN 978-1-935558-18-7
- The Mysterious Force (2010) (La Force Mystérieuse by J.-H. Rosny aîné (1913)) ISBN 978-1-935558-37-8
- The Master of Light (2010) (Le Maître de la Lumière by Maurice Renard (1933)) ISBN 978-1-935558-19-4
- Vamireh (2010) (Vamireh by J.-H. Rosny aîné (1892)) ISBN 978-1-935558-38-5
- The Givreuse Enigma (2010) (L'Enigme de Givreuse by J.-H. Rosny aîné (1892)) ISBN 978-1-935558-39-2
- The Man Who Found Himself (2010) (L'Homme Qui s'est retrouvé by Henri Duvernois (1936)) ISBN 978-1-935558-04-0
- The Black Coats: The Cadet Gang (2010) (La Bande Cadet by Paul Féval (1875)) ISBN 978-1-935558-45-3
- The Age of Lead (2010) (L'Age de Plomb by Henri Falk (1922)) ISBN 978-1-935558-42-2
- The Young Vampire (2010) (La Jeune Vampire by J.-H. Rosny aîné (1920)) ISBN 978-1-935558-40-8
- The Song of Montségur (2010) (Le Chant de Montségur by Sylvie Miller & Philippe Ward (2001)) ISBN 978-1-935558-56-9
- The Eye of Purgatory (2010) (L'Oeil du Purgatoire by Jacques Spitz (1945)) ISBN 978-1-935558-64-4
- The Gardens of the Apocalypse (2010) (Les Jardins de l'Apocalypse by Richard Bessière (1963)) ISBN 978-1-935558-68-2
- The Sinister Madame Atomos (2010) by André Caroff, Black Coat Press
- The Age of Lead and Other Fantastic Romances (2010) by Henri Falk, Black Coat Press
- The Cadet Gang (2010) by Paul Féval, Black Coat Press
- The Superhumans (2011) (Les Surhommes by Han Ryner (1929)) ISBN 978-1-935558-77-4
- The Supreme Progress: Eighteen French proto-science fiction stories from 1862 to 1890 (2011) ISBN 978-1-935558-82-8
- Chalet in the Sky (2011) (Un Chalet dans les Airs by Albert Robida (1925)) ISBN 978-1-935558-87-3
- The Secret of Zippelius (2011) (Le Secret des Zippelius by Jules Lermina (1893)) ISBN 978-1-935558-88-0
- The Vampire Lord Ruthwen (2011) (Lord Ruthwen ou Les Vampires by Cyprien Bérard (1820)) ISBN 978-1-61227-004-3
- Voyage to Venus (2011) (Voyage à Vénus by Achille Eyraud (1865)) ISBN 978-1-61227-005-0
- The Vengeance of the Oval Portrait (2011) by Gabriel de Lautrec (1922)) ISBN 978-1-61227-009-8
- The World Above the World: Nine French proto-science fiction stories from 1862 to 1890 (2011) ISBN 978-1-61227-002-9
- The Mysterious Fluid (2011) (Pour Lire en Automobile by Paul Vibert (1901)) ISBN 978-1-61227-020-3
- Ever Smaller (2011) (Toujours Plus Petits by Albert Bleunard (1893)) ISBN 978-1-162-27014-2
- The Black Coats: The Sword-Swallower (2011) (L' Avaleur de Sabres by Paul Féval (1867)) ISBN 978-1-61227-024-1
- The Great Cataclysm (2011) (Le Grand Cataclysme by Henri Allorge (1927)) ISBN 978-1-61227-026-5
- City of Glass (2011) (Une Ville de Verre by Alphonse Brown (1891)) ISBN 978-1-61227-023-4
- The Virgin Vampire (2011) (La Vampire ou la Vierge de Hongrie by Étienne-Léon de Lamothe-Langon (1825)) ISBN 978-1-61227-032-6
- Illa's End (2011) (La fin d'Illa by José Moselli (1925)) ISBN 978-1-61227-031-9
- Journey to the Inverted World (2011) (Voyage au Monde à l'Envers by Marcel Rouff (1920)) ISBN 978-1-61227-039-5
- Amilec (2011) (Amilec (1753); Giphantie (1760); L'Empire des zaziris sur les humains (1761) by Charles-François Tiphaigne de la Roche) ISBN 978-1-61227-033-3
- Baal (2011) (Baal (1924); Les Amantes du diable (1929) by Renée Dunan) ISBN 978-1-61227-046-3
- The Human Arrow (2011) (Les Ailes de l'Homme by Félicien Champsaur (1917; rev. 1927)) ISBN 978-1-61227-045-6
- The Wing (2011) (L'Aile, Roman des Temps Nouveaux by Jean Richepin (1911)) ISBN 978-1-61227-053-1
- The Xenobiotic Invasion (2011) (La Grande Panne by Theo Varlet (1930)) ISBN 978-1-61227-054-8
- The Tale of Gold and Silence (2011) (Le Conte de l'Or et du Silence by Gustave Kahn (1898)) ISBN 978-1-61227-063-0
- The World in 2000 Years (2011) (Le Monde dans 2000 Ans by Georges Pellerin (1878)) ISBN 978-1-61227-058-6
- Homage to Sir Terence ed. by Fred Ricou, Lau' "Tortoise" & Mestr Tom. Fan 2 Fantasy, 2011
- Nemoville: Twelve French proto-science fiction stories from 1757 to 1924 (2012) ISBN 978-1-61227-070-8
- The Adventures of a Parisian Aeronaut in the Unknown Worlds (2012) (Les Aventures d'un Aéronaute Parisien dans les Mondes Inconnus by Alfred Driou (1856)) ISBN 978-1-61227-067-8
- Illusions of Immortality (2012) by Edmond Haraucourt (nine stories from 1888 to 1919) ISBN 978-1-61227-075-3
- Timeslip Troopers (2012) (La Belle Valence by Théo Varlet & André Blandin (1923)) ISBN 978-1-61227-078-4
- A Surfeit of Mirrors (2012) (La Canne de jaspe (1897) & Histoires Incertaines (1919) by Henri de Régnier) ISBN 978-1-61227-076-0
- Double Life (2012) (misc. stories, 1843–1858) by Charles Asselineau ISBN 978-1-61227-079-1
- The Dominion of the World (4 volumes, 2012) (La Conspiration des Milliardaires (1899–1900) by Gustave Le Rouge & Gustave Guitton) ISBN 978-1-61227-095-1, 978-1-61227-096-8, 978-1-61227-097-5 and 978-1-61227-098-2
- The Year 5865 (2012) (L'An 5865 ou Paris dans 4000 Ans (1865) by Hippolyte Mettais) ISBN 978-1-61227-100-2
- The Tower of Destiny (2012) (Histoire de ce qui n'est pas arrivé (1854) and Les Ruines de Paris (1836) by Joseph Méry) ISBN 978-1-61227-101-9
- Investigations of the Future: Seven French proto-science fiction stories from 1851 to 1909 (2012) ISBN 978-1-61227-106-4
- The Future City (2012) (La Cité Future (1890) by Alain le Drimeur) ISBN 978-1-61227-114-9
- Ouha, King of the Apes (2012) (Ouha, Roi des Singes (1923) by Félicien Champsaur) ISBN 978-1-61227-115-6
- The Human Microbes (2012) (Les Microbes Humains (1887) by Louise Michel) ISBN 978-1-61227-116-3
- The New World (2012) (Le Nouveau Monde (1888) by Louise Michel) ISBN 978-1-61227-117-0
- The Vampire of the Val-de-Grace (2012) (Le Vampire du Val-de-Grace (1862) by Léon Gozlan) ISBN 978-1-61227-123-1
- The Frenetic People (2012) (Les Hommes Frénétiques (1925) by Ernest Pérochon) ISBN 978-1-61227-118-7
- The Golden Rock (2012) (Le Roc d'Or (1927) by Theo Varlet) ISBN 978-1-61227-134-7
- The Unpretentious Philosopher (2012) (Le Philosophe sans Prétention (1775) by Louis-Guillaume de La Follie) ISBN 978-1-61227-136-1
- Rouletabille at Krupp's (2013) (Rouletabille chez Krupp (1918) by Gaston Leroux) ISBN 978-1-61227-144-6
- Spawn of the Penitentiary (2013) (Fleur de Bagne (1902) by Marie-François Goron & Emile Gautier) ISBN 978-1-61227-137-8
- The Crazy Corner (2013) (Le Coin des Fous (1921) by Jean Richepin) ISBN 978-1-61227-142-2
- The Napus: The Great Plague of the Year 2227, Léon Daudet (Borgo Press January 2013) (from Le Napus: fléau de l'an 2227, 1927)
- The Bacchantes: A Dionysian Scientific Romance, Léon Daudet (Borgo Press January 2013) (from Les Bacchantes, 1931)
- Isoline and the Serpent-Flower (2013) (Isoline et la Fleur-Serpent (1882) by Judith Gautier) ISBN 978-1-61227-152-1
- The Conquest of the Air (2013) (La Conquête de l'Air (1875) by Alphonse Brown) ISBN 978-1-61227-143-9
- The Man Who Lost Himself: A Symbolist Novel, André Beaunier (Borgo Press February 2013) (from L'Homme qui a perdu son moi, 1911)
- Champavert: Immoral Tales, Pétrus Borel the Lycanthrope (Borgo Press February 2013)
- Pharaoh's Wife (2013) (La Pharaonne (1929) by Felicien Champsaur) ISBN 978-1-61227-156-9
- Love in 5000 Years (2013) (L'Amour dans 5000 Ans (1908) by Fernand Kolney) ISBN 978-1-61227-155-2
- Paris in the Year 2000 (2013) (Paris en l'An 2000 (1869) by Tony Moilin) ISBN 978-1-61227-160-6
- Monsieur Synthesis (2013) (Les Secrets de Monsieur Synthèse (1888) and Dix Mille Ans dans un Bloc de Glace (1889) by Louis Boussenard) ISBN 978-1-61227-161-3
- The Castaways of Eros (2013) (Autore Lescure, Pilote d'Astronef (1932) by Theo Varlet) ISBN 978-1-61227-177-4
- The Immortal Woman (2013) (La Femme Immortelle (1869) by Pierre-Alexis Ponson du Terrail) ISBN 978-1-61227-175-0
- The Antisocial Man and Other Strange Stories, Frédéric Boutet (Borgo Press May 2013)
- The Voyage of Julius Pingouin and Other Strange Stories, Frédéric Boutet (Borgo Press June 2103)
- The Centaurs (2013) (Les Centaures (1904) by André Lichtenberger) ISBN 978-1-61227-184-2
- Electric Life (2013) (La Vie Electrique (1892) by Albert Robida) ISBN 978-1-61227-182-8
- Voyage Beneath the Waves: A Science Fiction Novel, Jules Rengade (Borgo Press July 2013) (from Voyage sous les flots, 1867)
- Claude Mercoeur's Reflection and Other Strange Stories, Frédéric Boutet (Borgo Press July 2013)
- The Eternal Flame (2013) (La Flamme Eternelle (1931), Ciel Rose (1933) by Michel Corday) ISBN 978-1-61227-189-7
- In a Thousand Years (2013) (Dans Mille Ans (1884) by Emile Calvet) ISBN 978-1-61227-192-7
- The Children of the Crab (2013) (Raramémé (1921) by André Lichtenberger) ISBN 978-1-61227-200-9
- Danse Macabre (2013) (Danse Macabre (1832) by Paul Lacroix) ISBN 978-1-61227-205-4
- Obsession (2013) (L'Obsession – Moi et l'Autre (1908) by Jules Claretie) ISBN 978-1-61227-213-9
- Ahasuerus (2013) (Ahasverus (1834) by Edgar Quinet) ISBN 978-1-61227-214-6
- The Chambrion and Other Stories, Pierre Alexis Ponson du Terrail (Borgo Press September 2013)
- The Anatomy of Love and Murder: Psychoanalytical Fantasies, Gaston Danville (Borgo Press September 2013)
- King of the Night [in Return of the Nyctalope] (2013) by Jean de La Hire, Black Coat Press
- The Adventures of Captain Cap (2013) (Le Captain Cap, ses aventures, ses idées, ses breuvages (1902) by Alphonse Allais) ISBN 978-1-61227-218-4
- The Fiery Wheel (2013) (La Roue Fulgurante (1908) by Jean de La Hire) ISBN 978-1-61227-217-7
- Martyrs of Science (2013) (original collection of stories by S. Henry Berthoud) ISBN 978-1-61227-229-0
- Prince Bonifacio (2013) (Prince Bonifacio (1864) by Louis Ulbach) ISBN 978-1-61227-228-3
- Cybele (2013) (Cybele (1891) by Adolphe Alhaiza) ISBN 978-1-61227-231-3
- The Conqueror of Death (2013) (original collection of 8 French scientific romances) ISBN 978-1-61227-230-6
- Someone is Stealing Children in Paris (2014) (On Vole des Enfants à Paris (1906) by Louis Forest) ISBN 978-1-61227-252-8
- The Magnetized Corpse (2014) (original collection of stories by Jules Janin)) ISBN 978-1-61227-248-1
- The Mysterious Doctor Cornelius (2014) (Le Mystérieux Docteur Cornelius (1912–13) by Gustave Le Rouge) ISBN 978-1-61227-243-6; 978-1-61227-244-3; 978-1-61227-245-0
- The Vampires of London (2014) (Le Vampire (1852) by Angelo de Sorr) ISBN 978-1-61227-264-1
- The Marvelous Adventures of Serge Myrandhal on Mars (2014) (Les Aventures Merveilleuses de Serge Myrandhal sur la Planete Mars (1908) by H. Gayar) ISBN 978-1-61227-265-8
- The Necessary Evil (2014) (Le Mal Nécessaire (1899) by André Couvreur) ISBN 978-1-61227-253-5
- Caresco, Superman (2014) (Caresco, Surhomme (1904) by André Couvreur) ISBN 978-1-61227-254-2
- The Exploits of Professor Tornada 1 (2014) (Une Invasion de Macrobes (1909); L'Androgyne (1922) by André Couvreur) ISBN 978-1-61227-279-5
- The Exploits of Professor Tornada 2 (2014) (Le Valeur Phosphorescent (1923); Mémoires d'un Immortel (1924) by André Couvreur) ISBN 978-1-61227-280-1
- The Exploits of Professor Tornada 3 (2014) (Le Biocole (1927); Le Cas de la Baronne Sasoitsu (1939) by André Couvreur) ISBN 978-1-61227-281-8
- The Eupantophone (2014) (L'Eupantophone (1904) by Henri Austruy) ISBN 978-1-61227-293-1
- The Petitpaon Era (2014) (L'Ere Petitpaon (1906) by Henri Austruy) ISBN 978-1-61227-294-8
- The Olotelepan (2014) (L'Olotelepan (1925) by Henri Austruy) ISBN 978-1-61227-295-5
- An Unknown World (2014) (Un Monde Inconnu, Deux Ans sur la Lune (1896) by Pierre de Selenes) ISBN 978-1-61227-302-0
- The Enchanter Merlin (2014) (Merlin l'Enchanteur (1860) by Edgar Quinet) ISBN 978-1-61227-303-7
- The Human Ant (2014) (L'Homme Fourmi (1901) by Han Ryner) ISBN 978-1-61227-323-5
- The Silent Bomb (2014) (La Bombe Silencieuse (1916) by Charles Dodeman) ISBN 978-1-61227-319-8
- Paris Before the Deluge (2014) (Paris Avant le Déluge (1866) by Hippolyte Mattais) ISBN 978-1-61227-328-0
- The Battle of Strasbourg (2014) (La Bataille de Strasbourg (1892) by Jules Lermina) ISBN 978-1-61227-324-2
- The Revolt of the Machines (2014) (original collection of 8 French scientific romances) ISBN 978-1-61227-333-4
- The Final War (2014) (La Guerre Finale (1885) by Barillet-Lagargousse) ISBN 978-1-61227-337-2
- Homo-Deus (2014) (Homo deus, le satyre invisible (1923) and Tuer les vieux, jouir! (1925) by Félicien Champsaur) ISBN 978-1-61227-351-8
- Daâh: The First Human (2014) (Daâh, le premier homme (1914) by Edmond Haraucourt plus further stories) ISBN 978-1-61227-355-6
- The Magnetized Corpse (2014) (Contes Fantastiques et contes littéraires (1832) by Jules Janin) ISBN 978-1-61227-248-1
- Prince Bonifacio and Other Stories (2014) (Le Prince Bonifacio; La dame blanche de Bade; Le petit homme rouge; Le démon du laco (1864) by Louis Ulbach) ISBN 978-1-61227-228-3
- The Enchanted City (2014) by Eugène Hennebert, Black Coat Press
- The World Turned Upside Down (2014) by Léonie Rouzade, Black Coat Press
- The Ark (2015) (Le Roi du Galande (1910) and L'Arche (1920) by André Arnyvelde) ISBN 978-1-61227-432-4
- The Mutilated Bacchus (2015) (Le Bacchus Mutilé (1922) and Demande un Homme, ou L'Étrange Tournoi d'Amour (1924) by André Arnyvelde) ISBN 978-1-61227-433-1
- Nora, the Ape-Woman (2015) (Nora, la guenon devenue femme (1929) by Félicien Champsaur) ISBN 978-1-61227-403-4
- The Misfortunes of John Bull (2015) (Les Malheurs de John Bull (1884) by Camille Debans) ISBN 978-1-61227-411-9
- The World of Mercury (2015) (Relation du Monde de Mercure (1750) by Chevalier de Béthune) ISBN 978-1-61227-410-2
- Balzac's Cane (2015) (Le Lorgnon as Delphine Gay (1831) and La Canne de M de Balzac (1836) by Mme Émile de Girardin) ISBN 978-1-61227-368-6
- The Philosophic Voyager in an Island Unknown to the Inhabitants of Earth (2015) (Le Voyageur Philosophe dans un Pays Inconnu aux Inhabitants de la Terre (1761) by Mr de Listonai) ISBN 978-1-61227-367-9
- The Voyages of Lord Seaton to the Seven Planets (2015) (Voyage de Milord Séton dans les Sept Planètes, ou Le nouveau mentor (1765–1766) by Marie-Anne de Roumier-Robert) ISBN 978-1-61227-446-1
- The War of the Sexes (2015) (Tel qui est! (1926) by Odette Dulac) ISBN 978-1-61227-405-8
- Jim Click (2015) (Jim Click ou La Merveilleuse Invention (1930) by Fernand Fleuret) ISBN 978-1-61227-442-3
- The Enchanted City: A Voyage to Lake Tanganyika (2015) (La ville enchantée, voyage au Lac Tanganyika (1885) by Eugène Hennebert) ISBN 978-1-61227-345-7
- The Maker of Men and his Formula (2015) (Le Faiseur d'Hommes et sa Formule (1906) by Jules Hoche) ISBN 978-1-61227-426-3
- The Missing Men of the Sirius (2015) (Les Trois Disparus du "Sirius" (1896) by Georges Price) ISBN 978-1-61227-387-7
- The Engineer von Satanas (2015) (L'Ingénieur von Satanas (1919) by Albert Robida) ISBN 978-1-61227-425-6
- The World Turned Upside Down (2015) (Voyage de Théodose à l'île d'Utopie (1872) and Le monde reversé (1872) by Léonie Rouzade) ISBN 978-1-61227-346-4
- The Strange Voyages of Jacques Massé and Pierre de Mésange (2015) (Voyages et Avantures de Jaques Massé anonymous (circa 1714) and La Vie, Les Aventures, & le Voyage de Groenland du Révérend Pere Cordelier Pierre de Mésange (1720) by Simon Tyssot de Patot) ISBN 978-1-61227-370-9
- The Merchants of Health and Other Fantastic Stories (2015) (Les Marchands de Santé (1862) and Monsieur Personne (1864) by Pierre Véron) ISBN 978-1-61227-372-3
- The Bacheloress (2015) by Victor Margueritte. Black Coat Press
- The Companion (2015) by Victor Margueritte. Black Coat Press
- The Couple (2015) by Victor Margueritte, Black Coat Press
- Around the World on Five Sous (2015) by Henri Chabrillat & Paul d'Ivoi. Black Coat Press
- The Man with the Blue Face and Other French Scientific Romances. Black Coat Press (2015)
- The Ultimate Pleasure and Other Stories (2015) by Renée Dunan. Black Coat Press
- The Murderer of the World (2015) by Gaston de Wailly. Black Coat Press
- The Fossil Man (2015) by Jules Gros. Black Coat Press
- The Aerial Valley and Other Utopian Fantasies. Black Coat Press, (2015)
- The Last Days of Atlantis (2015) by Charles Lomon and Pierre-Barthémeny Gheusi, Black Coat Press
- The New Moon and Other Imaginary Voyages. Black Coat Press, (2015)
- The Last Fay (2016) (La Dernière fée, ou La Nouvelle Lampe merveilleuse (1823) by Horace de Saint-Aubin) ISBN 978-1-61227-547-5
- Journey to the Sun (2016) (Paris avant les hommes (1861) by Pierre Boitard) ISBN 978-1-61227-517-8
- Voyage to the Center of the Earth (2016) (Voyage au centre de la terre, ou, Aventures diverses de Clairancy et de se compagnons, dans le Spitzberg, au Pôle-Nord, et dans des pays inconnus (1821) by Jacques-Albin Simon Collin de Plancy) ISBN 978-1-61227-487-4
- Harry Dickson: Tenebras (2016) (Tenebras, le bandit fantôme (1912) by Arnould Galopin) ISBN 978-1-61227-562-8
- The Apocryphal Napoleon (2016) (Napoléon et la conquête du monde, 1812–1832: Histoire de la monarchie universalle (1836) by Louis Geoffroy) ISBN 978-1-61227-579-6
- The Second Life of Doctor Albin (2016) (La seconde vie du docteur Albin (1902) by Raoul Gineste) ISBN 978-1-61227-467-6
- An International Mission to the Moon (2016) (Une mission internationale sur la Lune (1933) plus two other tales by Jean Petithuguenin) ISBN 978-1-61227-466-9
- The Chimerical Quest (2016) (Le Soleil Noir (1929) and La Chasse aux chimères (1932) by René Pujol) ISBN 978-1-61227-488-1
- The Discovery of the Austral Continent by a Flying Man (2016) (La découverte australe par un Homme-volant, ou le Dédale français (1781) by Restif de la Bretonne) ISBN 978-1-61227-512-3
- The Son of Silence (2016) (Le fils du silence (1911) and Les Paraboles Cyniques (1913) by Han Ryner) ISBN 978-1-61227-549-9
- The Nickel Man and Other French Scientific Romances. Black Coat Press, (2016)
- On the Brink of the World's End and Other French Scientific Romances, Black Coat Press, (2016)
- The Mirror of Present Events and Other French Scientific Romances, Black Coat Press, (2016)
- The Virgin Orient and Other Stories (2016) by Camille Mauclair, Black Coat Press
- The Humanisphere and Other Utopian Fantasies, Black Coat Press, (2016)
- Posthumous Correspondence by (2016) Restif de La Bretonne, Black Coat Press
- The Tarantulas' Parlor and Other Unkind Tales (2016) by Léon Bloy. Snuggly Books
- The Soul-Drinker and Other Stories (2016) by Jean Lorrain, Snuggly Books
- Astral Amour (2016) by Willy, Black Coat Press
- The Crocodile; or, The War Between Good and Evil (2016) by Louis-Claude Saint-Martin, Black Coat Press
- The Lynx (2016) by Michel Corday & André Couvreur, Black Coat Press
- The Perfume of Lust (2016) by Gaston Danville, Black Coat Press
- The End of Atlantis (2017) (La Fin d'Atlantis ou le grand soir (1926) by Jean Carrère) ISBN 978-1-61227-618-2
- Phantoms and Other Cruel Tales (2017) by Charles-Marie Flor O'Squarr, Black Coat Press
- The Unknown Collaborator and Other Legendary Tales (2017) by Victor Joly, Snuggly Books
- The Police Agent (2017) by Pierre-Alexis Ponson du Terrail, Black Coat Press
- Bluebirds (2017) by Catulle Mendès, Snuggly Books
- The Angel Asrael and Other Legendary Tales (2017) by S. Henry Berthoud, Black Coat Press
- The Human Paradise (2017) by Nicolas Ségur, Black Coat Press, 2017
- The Naiads and The Beauty and the Beast (2017) by Madame de Villeneuve, Black Coat Press
- The Latin Orgy (2017) by Félicien Champsaur, Snuggly Books
- The Green Eyes and Other Stories (2017) by Henri de Saint-Georges, Black Coat Press
- Masks in the Tapestry (2017) by Jean Lorrain, Snuggly Books
- The Marvelous Story of Claire d'Amour and Other Stories (2017) by Maurice Magre, Black Coat Press
- The Call of the Beast and Other Stories (2017) by Maurice Magre, Black Coat Press
- The Mirror of Legends (2017) by Bernard Lazare, Snuggly Books
- Priscilla of Alexandria and Other Stories (2017) by Maurice Magre, Black Coat Press
- The Angel of Lust (2017) by Maurice Magre, Black Coat Press
- The Mystery of the Tiger (2017) by Maurice Magre, Black Coat Press
- The Poison of Goa (2017) by Maurice Magre, Black Coat Press
- Lucifer (2017) by Maurice Magre, Black Coast Press
- The Blood of Toulouse (2017) by Maurice Magre, Black Coat Press
- The Albigensian Treasure (2017) by Maurice Magre, Black Coast Press
- Jean de Fodoas (2017) by Maurice Magre, Black Coast Press
- The Emerald Princess and Other Decadent Fantasies (2017) by Félicien Champsaur, Snuggly Books
- The Frail Soul and Other Stories (2017) by Camille Mauclair, Snuggly Books
- The Man Who Married a Mermaid (2017) with Paul Bocage (Les Mariages du père Olifus (1849) by Alexandre Dumas) ISBN 978-1-61227-612-0
- Arrival in the Stars and Other Stories (2017) (stories from Fantasmagories, histoires rapides (coll 1887) plus L'Arrivée aux étoiles: essai vers l'au-delà (1922) by Jean Rameau) ISBN 978-1-61227-627-4
- The Story of the Great Prince Oribeau (The Fay Ouroucoucou 1) (2017) (Les veillées du marais, ou, histoire du grand prince Oribeau, roi de Mommonie, au pays d'Evinland; & de la vertueuse princesse Oribelle, de Lagenie: tirée des anciénnes annales Irlandaises, & recenment-translatée en-français (1785) by Restif de la Bretonne) ISBN 978-1-61227-601-4
- The Four Beauties and the Four Beasts (The Fay Ouroucoucou 2) (2017) (Restif de la Bretonne) ISBN 978-1-61227-602-1
- In 1965 and Other Stories (2018) (Albert Robida) ISBN 978-1-61227-728-8
- Singular Amours (2018) (Trois Amours Singulières (1886) by Edmond Thiaudière) ISBN 978-1-61227-730-1
- Melusine by Maurice Magre, Black Coast Press, (2018)
- The Brothers of the Virgin Gold by Maurice Magre, Black Coat Press, (2018)
- The Companions of the Silence by Paul Féval, Black Coat Press, (2018)
- Misanthropic Tales by S. Henry Berthoud, Snuggly Books, (2018)
- In 1965 and Other Stories (2018) (Albert Robida) ISBN 978-1-61227-728-8
- Singular Amours (2018) (Trois Amours Singulières (1886) by Edmond Thiaudière) ISBN 978-1-61227-730-1 by Nicolas Ségur, Black Coat Press, (2018)
- The Robe of Sincerity and Other Stories by Marie-Jeanne de L'Heritier de Villandon, Black Coat Press, (2018)
- The Death of Balzac by Octave Mirbeau, Snuggly Books, (2018)
- The Mysterious Hermit of the Tomb by Étienne Lamothe-Langon, Black Coat Press, (2018)
- In 1965 and Other Stories (2018) (Albert Robida) ISBN 978-1-61227-728-8
- Singular Amours (2018) (Trois Amours Singulières (1886) by Edmond Thiaudière) ISBN 978-1-61227-730-1 by X. B. Saintine, Black Coat Press, (2018)
- In 1965 and Other Stories (2018) (Albert Robida) ISBN 978-1-61227-728-8
- Singular Amours (2018) (Trois Amours Singulières (1886) by Edmond Thiaudière) ISBN 978-1-61227-730-1 by X. B. Saintine, Black Coat Press, (2018)
- Decadence and Symbolism: A Showcase Anthology, Snuggly Books (2018)
- Pan's Flute and Other Stories (2018) by J.-H. Rosny aîné, Black Coat Press
- The Ring of Light (2018) by L. Miral and A.Viger, Black Coat Press
- The Demi-Sexes and The Androgynes (2018) by Jane de La Vaudère, Snuggly Books
- The Bull-Man and the Grasshopper (2018) by Jean Richepin, Snuggly Books
- The Land of Delights and Other Tales of Enchantment (2018) by Charlotte-Rose de Caumont de La Force, Black Coat Press
- The Iron Man and Other Visionary Fantasies (2018) by Louis-Sébastien Mercier, Black Coat Press
- Lilith's Legacy: Prose Poems and Short Stories (2018) by Renée Vivien, Snuggly Books
- Marilyn in Manhattan (2018) by Philippe Ward, Black Coat Press
- Dieudonat (2018) by Edmond Haraucourt, Black Coat Press
- The Palace of Vengeance and Other Tales of Enchantment (2018) by Henriette-Julie de Murat, Black Coat Press
- The Double Star and Other Occult Fantasies (2018) by Jane de La Vaudère, Snuggly Books
- Misty Thule (2018) by Adolphe Retté, Snuggly Books
- Superhuman Tales (2018) by Victor-Émile Michelet, Black Coat Press
- Journey to the Isles of Atlantis and Other Fanciful Tales, Black Coat Press (2018)
- Princess Camion and Other Tales of Enchantment (2018) by Marie-Madeleine de Lubert. Black Coat Press
- The Murdered City (2018) by Fernand Mysor, Black Coat Press
- The Tyranny of the Fays Abolished and Other Stories (2018) by Comtesse D.L. Black Coat Press
- Errant Vice (2018) by Jean Lorrain, Snuggly Books
- The Impossible Enchantment and Other Tales of Faerie (2018) by the Comte de Caylus. Black Coat Press
- Florine and Boca: Tales of Faerie (2018) by Françoise Le Marchand. Black Coat Press
- The Queen of the Fays and Other Marvelous Tales. Black Coat Press (2018)
- Funestine and Other Adventures in Romancia. Black Coat Press (2018)
- The Torch-Bearers by Bernard Lazare, Snuggly Books (2018)
- The Enchanter's Mirror and Other Stories (2019) by Marie-Antoinette Fagnan. Black Coat Press
- The Origin of the Fays and Other Stories, Black Coat Press (2019)
- Tales of the Fays (2019) by Marie-Catherine d'Aulnoy (2 volumes). Black Coat Press
- Babels, Balloons and Innocent Eyes (2019) by Charles Morice, Snuggly Books
- Halyartes and Other Poems in Prose (2019) by Éphraïm Mikhaël, Snuggly Books
- The Little Fays of the Air and Other Tales of Faerie (2019) by Catulle Mendès, Black Coat Press
- Faustina and Other Stories (2019) by Renée Vivien and Hélène de Zuylen de Nyevelt, Snuggly Books
- For Reading in the Bath (2019) by Catulle Mendes, Snuggly Books
- The Exigent Shadow and Other Strange Obsessions (2019) by Catulle Mendès, Black Coat Press
- Don Juan in Paradise and Other Amorous Fantasies (2019) by Catulle Mendès, Black Coat Press
- Elsewhere and Other Stories (2019) by G. Albert Aurier, Snuggly Books
- The Enchanted Ring (2019) by Philothée O'Neddy, Snuggly Books
- The Incredible Adventure and Other Interstellar Excursions, Black Coat Press (2019)
- The Man Who Could Read Minds (2019) by Paul Gsell, Black Coat Press
- The Mystery of Kama and Brahma's Courtesans (2019) by Jane de La Vaudère, Snuggly Books
- The Prince of Fools (2019) by Gérard de Nerval, Black Coat Press
- William's Angel and Other Stories (2019) by S. Henry Berthoud, Black Coat Press
- The Sacred Fire (2019) by Gabriel de Lautrec, Black Coat Press
- A Woman Appeared to Me (2019) by Renée Vivien, Snuggly Books
- From a Faraway Land (2019) by Remy de Gourmont, Snuggly Books
- The Angel and the Sphinx (2019) by Édouard Schuré, Black Coat Press
- Human Seed by André Couvreur, Black Coat Press (2019)
- Isis (2019) by Auguste de Villiers de l'Isle Adam, Snuggly Books
- Mephistophela (2019) by Catulle Mendès, Snuggly Books
- Fards and Poisons (2019) by Jean Lorrain. Snuggly Books
- The Bad Dream (2019) by Jules Hoche, Black Coat Press
- Reincarnation and Redemption (2019) by Gilbert-Augustin Thierry, Snuggly Books
- Three Flowers and the King of Siam's Amazon (2019) by Jane de La Vaudère, Snuggly Books
- The Alluring (2019) by Félicien Champsaur, Black Coat Press
- Hannibal's Ring (2019) by Jules-Amédée Barbey d'Aurevilly, Snuggly Books
- Double-Head (2020) by Gaston Danville, Black Coat Press
- Hauntings (2020) by Édouard Dujardin. Snuggly Books
- Automata: The Legacy (2020) of Jacques Vaucanson, Black Coat Press
- The Snuggly Satyricon, Snuggly Books, (2020)
- The Fiancés of the Year 2000 (2020) by Paul Féval fils & H.-J. Magog, Black Coat Press
- The Path of Amour (2020) by Marie Krysinska, Snuggly Books, (2020)
- Weird Fiction in France: A Showcase Anthology of its Origins and Development, Black Coat Press
- The Bald Giants and Other French Scientific Romances, Black Coat Press, (2020)
- The World of the Damned (2020) by Paul Féval fils & H.-J. Magog, Black Coat Press
- The Gate of Ivory (2020) by Bernard Lazare, Snuggly Books
- The Awakening of Atlantis (2020) by Paul Féval fils & H.-J. Magog, Black Coat Press
- A Malediction (2020) by Erckmann-Chatrian, Snuggly Books
- Decadent Prose Pieces (2020) by Léo Trézenik, Snuggly Books
- Humankind Enchained (2020) by Paul Féval fils & H.-J. Magog. Black Coat Press
- The Maker of Madwomen (2020) by Paul Féval fils & H.-J. Magog. Black Coat Press
- Syta's Harem and Pharaoh's Lover (2020) by Jane de La Vaudère, Snuggly Books
- Monsieur de Bougrelon and Other Stories (2020) by Jean Lorrain, Snuggly Books
- The Modesty of Sodom (2020) by Gustave Guiches, Snuggly Books
- Snuggly Tales of Hashish and Opium, Snuggly Books (2020)
- The Miller of Carnac and Other Works (2020) by Antoine-Louis Duclaux, Comte de l'Estoille, writing as Louis de Lyvron. Black Coat Press
- The Last Siren and Other Stories (2020) by Lucie Delarue-Mardrus, Snuggly Books
- The Song of the Skylark (2020) by Antoine-Louis Duclaux, Comte de l'Estoille, writing as A. de l'Estoille. Black Coat Press
- Argentine and Other Works (2021) by Antoine-Louis Duclaux, Comte de l'Estoille, writing as A. de L'Estoille. Black Coat Press
- Double Heart (2021) by Marcel Schwob, Snuggly Books
- An Idyll in Sodom (2021) by Georges de Lys, Snuggly Books
- The Enchanted Castle (2021) by Alphonse Esquiros, Snuggly Books
- The Blonde Tress and the Mask (2021) by Gilbert-Augustin Thierry, Snuggly Books
- The Witch of Ecbatana and the Virgin of Israel (2021) by Jane de La Vaudère, Snuggly Books
- Fays of the Sea and Other Fantasies. Black Coat Press
- A Decadent Woman (2021) by Georges de Peyrebrune, Snuggly Books
- The Red Spider (2021) by Delphi Fabrice, Snuggly Books
- Magical Tales (2021) by Théodore de Banville, Black Coat Press
- Flowers of Ether (2021) by Delphi Fabrice, Snuggly Books
- Penthesilea (2021) by Georges de Lys, Snuggly Books
- Midnight!! (2021) by Claude Vignon, Black Coat Press
- The Snuggly Sirenicon, Snuggly Books, (2021)
- Jean Sbogar and Other Stories (2021) by Charles Nodier. Snuggly Books
- Amanit (2021) by Lucie Delarue-Mardrus, Snuggly Books,
- The Last Rendezvous: Stories and Prose Poems (2021) by May Armand Blanc ISBN 978-1645250593
- Princesses of Darkness and Other Exotica (2021) by Jean Lorrain ISBN 978-1645250692

=== As editor ===
==== Anthology series ====
- Decadence
  - 1 The Daedalus Book of Decadence (Moral Ruins) (1990)
  - 2 The Second Daedalus Book of Decadence: The Black Feast (1992)

==== Anthologies ====
- Tales of the Wandering Jew (1991)
- The Dedalus Book of British Fantasy: The 19th Century (1991)
- The Dedalus Book of Femmes Fatales (1992)
- Scientific Romance: An International Anthology of Pioneering Science Fiction, Dover (2017)

=== Nonfiction ===
- The Mysteries of Modern Science (Routledge & Kegan Paul 1977)
- A Clash of Symbols: The Triumph of James Blish (Borgo Press October 1979) / (Borgo Press August 2008)
- Masters of Science Fiction: Essays on Six Science Fiction Authors (Borgo Press December 1981)
- The Science in Science Fiction (Michael Joseph 1982 / Knopf February 1983) (with Peter Nicholls as General Editor and David Langford as fellow Contributor)
- Future Man: Brave New World or Genetic Nightmare? (Crown October 1984)
- The Third Millennium: A History of the World AD 2000–3000 (with David Langford) (Sidgwick & Jackson July 1985 / Knopf August 1985)
- Scientific Romance in Britain, 1890–1950 (Fourth Estate September 1985 / St. Martin's Press November 1985)
- The Sociology of Science Fiction (Borgo Press April 1987) (Borgo Press September 2007); book version of Stableford's doctoral thesis
- The Way to Write Science Fiction (Elm Tree Books April 1989)
- Algebraic Fantasies and Realistic Romances: More Masters of Science Fiction (Borgo Press February 1995) / (Borgo Press September 2007)
- Opening Minds: Essays on Fantastic Literature (Borgo Press April 1995) / (Borgo Press September 2007)
- Outside the Human Aquarium: Masters of Science Fiction, Second Edition (Borgo Press September 1995) / (Borgo Press April 2008); Read an excerpt on the fiction of Clark Ashton Smith
- Writing Fantasy & Science Fiction and Getting Published (Teach Yourself Books December 1997)
- Glorious Perversity: The Decline and Fall of Literary Decadence (Borgo Press 1998) / (Borgo Press October 2008)
- Yesterday's Bestsellers: A Voyage through Literary History (Borgo Press May 1998) / (Borgo Press August 2008)
- The Dictionary of Science Fiction Places (Fireside Books April 1999)
- Historical Dictionary of Science Fiction Literature (Scarecrow Press June 2004); revised as The A to Z of Science Fiction Literature (Scarecrow Press September 2005)
- Historical Dictionary of Fantasy Literature (Scarecrow Press July 2005) – see Stableford's note; revised as The A to Z of Fantasy Literature (Scarecrow Press August 2009)
- Science Fact and Science Fiction: An Encyclopedia (Routledge September 2006)
- Slaves of the Death Spiders and Other Essays on Fantastic Literature (Borgo Press November 2006); also available as an ebook, listed at 65,566 words
- Space, Time, and Infinity: Essays on Fantastic Literature (Borgo Press December 2006)
- Heterocosms and Other Essays on Fantastic Literature (Borgo Press February 2007); also available as an ebook, listed at 89,003 words
- The Devil's Party: A Brief History of Satanic Abuse (Borgo Press March 2009)
- Gothic Grotesques: Essays on Fantastic Literature (Borgo Press March 2009)
- News of the Black Feast and Other Random Reviews (Borgo Press March 2009)
- Jaunting on the Scoriac Tempests and Other Essays on Fantastic Literature (Borgo Press April 2009)
- Against the New Gods and Other Essays on Writers of Imaginative Fiction (Borgo Press November 2009)
- Narrative Strategies in Science Fiction and Other Essays on Imaginative Fiction (Borgo Press December 2009)
- Exotic Encounters: Selected Reviews (Borgo Press January 2010)
- Creators of Science Fiction: Essays on Authors, Editors, and Publishers Who Shaped Science Fiction (Borgo Press March 2010)
- The Decadent World-View: Selected Essays (Borgo Press August 2010)
- New Atlantis: A Narrative History of Scientific Romance, Vol. 1: The Origins of Scientific Romance (Borgo Press February 2016)
- New Atlantis: A Narrative History of Scientific Romance, Vol. 2: The Emergence of Scientific Romance (Borgo Press February 2016)
- New Atlantis: A Narrative History of Scientific Romance, Vol. 3: The Resurgence of Scientific Romance (Borgo Press February 2016)
- New Atlantis: A Narrative History of Scientific Romance, Vol. 4: The Decadence of Scientific Romance (Borgo Press February 2016)
- The Plurality of Imaginary Worlds: The Evolution of French Roman Scientifique (Black Coat Press March 2016)
- Tales of Enchantment and Disenchantment: A History of Faerie, with an Exemplary Anthology of Tales. (Black Coat Press, 2019)
