= The Third Millennium: A History of the World AD 2000–3000 =

Book by Brian Stableford and David Langford

- Cover
- Authors: Brian Stableford; David Langford
- Language: English
- Genre: Science fiction
- Published: 1985
- Publication place: United Kingdom
- Media type: Print (Hardcover)
- Pages: 224
- ISBN: 978-0283992117

The Third Millennium: A History of the World AD 2000–3000 is a 1985 book by the science fiction writers Brian Stableford and David Langford. It is a fictional historical account, from the perspective of the year 3000, giving a future history of humanity and its technological and sociological developments.

== Plot ==
Some of the developments mentioned include:

- Artificial intelligence.
- Asteroid mining (such as the "Cracking of Ceres").
- Bioengineered foods including whimsical items such as the Jack Spratt Grass Chop, photosynthetic suits grafted to human skin meant to provide a means of sustenance without eating.
- Extreme cosmetic body modification such as skin with pockets, flashing irises, fur, claws, and fingernails which function as timepieces.
- Genetic engineering, including life extension and transhumanism as some humans become engineered to live in extreme environments such as cold, zero-g, and even water-breathing humans for aquatic communities.
- Geopolitical events such as war, famine, pestilence, and terrorism (as well as the "Sinking of Japan" by an earthquake).
- Implementation of fusion power.
- Interstellar colonization, and eventual extraterrestrial contact.
- L5 (Lagrange Point) space colonies such as those proposed by scientist Gerard K. O'Neill.
- Self-driving automobiles (the "Tiger-Dream Machine" from Ford Autocar).
- Sublight starships such as the Bussard Ramjet.
- Terraforming.

== Related works ==
Stableford commented in a 2001 interview with Strange Horizons magazine that a number of his stories were set in updated versions of the future history imagined in The Third Millennium. These included the story "...And He Not Busy Being Born", the novellas Les Fleurs du Mall, Inherit the Earth, and Mortimer Gray's History of Death, as well as the novels of his Emortality series, four of which were expanded versions of the previously mentioned stories.
