= Mortimer Gray's History of Death =

1995 novella by Brian Stableford

- Author: Brian Stableford
- Language: English
- Genre: Science fiction
- Published in: Isaac Asimov's Science Fiction Magazine
- Publication date: April 1995
- Media type: Magazine

"Mortimer Gray's History of Death" is a science fiction novella published in 1995 by Brian Stableford. It was nominated for the 1996 Nebula Award for Best Novella. The story takes place in an updated version of Stableford's 1985 future history, The Third Millennium: A History of the World AD 2000-3000.

== Plot summary ==
The story follows Mortimer Gray, a man who has extended his life for several hundred years. It begins as Mortimer is involved in a shipwreck and narrowly escapes death. This experience prompts him to write several volumes about the subject of death and humanity's war with it. The novella is divided into several small chapters which alternatively describe the adventures of Mortimer's life and the reactions of the public to his latest volume of The History of Death.
