= Balance of Power (Stableford novel) =

1979 novel by Brian Stableford

Balance of Power is a novel by Brian Stableford published in 1979.

== Plot summary ==
Balance of Power is a novel in which the ship Daedalus continues its planetfalls.

== Reception ==
Dave Pringle reviewed Balance of Power for Imagine magazine, and stated that "this is a fairly humdrum example of Stableford's work. There is too much jungle-adventure and piracy-on-the-high-seas stuff in this book for it to succeed as SF."

== Reviews ==
- Review by Keith L. Justice (1979) in Science Fiction & Fantasy Book Review, May 1979
- Review by Mary Gentle (1984) in Interzone, #8 Summer 1984
- Review by Joseph Nicholas (1984) in Paperback Inferno, Volume 7, Number 6
