= Fernand Kolney =

French writer and anarchist (1868–1930)

- Born: Ferdinand Édouard Pochon; 25 May 1868; Pantin, France
- Died: 12 March 1930 (aged 61); Paris, France
- Occupations: Novelist; pamphleteer; journalist
- Relatives: Laurent Tailhade (brother-in-law)
- Writing career
- Language: French
- Notable work: L'Amour dans cinq mille ans
- Literary movement: Anarchism; Neo-Malthusianism

Fernand Kolney (25 May 1868 – 12 March 1930) was the pen name of the French novelist, pamphleteer and journalist Ferdinand Édouard Pochon, who also wrote as Fernand Pochon de Colnet. He was close to the French anarchist movement and was one of the better-known writers of the neo-Malthusian campaign for birth control.

== Life ==
Kolney was born in Pantin, in the Seine department. His sister, Eugénie Pochon, was married to the poet Laurent Tailhade, making the two men brothers-in-law. Kolney later wrote a critical study of Tailhade's work.

Although he is remembered mainly as a novelist, Kolney was also a political militant. He set out his neo-Malthusian views in two pamphlets, La Grève des ventres ("The Strike of the Wombs", 1908) and Le Crime d'engendrer ("The Crime of Breeding", 1909), both arguing that working people should deliberately limit the number of children they had. He wrote for the anarchist press, including La Revue anarchiste and the neo-Malthusian review Génération consciente, and contributed a regular column, "Le carnet du guérillero", to the magazine Les Hommes du jour. Alongside his political work he produced novels and edited selections of 17th- and 18th-century libertine and erotic literature, among them an anthology drawn from Casanova.

His 1904 novel Le Salon de Madame Truphot, reissued in 1927 as Le Salon de Madame Truphot ou le Moderne Satyricon, was a roman à clef satirising the Parisian literary world. Several writers and public figures appeared in it under barely disguised names, and it brought Kolney into conflict with Octave Mirbeau and Jehan Rictus, both of whom were caricatured.

Kolney died in the 14th arrondissement of Paris on 12 March 1930. An obituary by the anarchist writer Aurèle Patorni appeared in La Revue anarchiste the following month.

== Science fiction ==
Kolney's most discussed work of fiction is the science fiction novel L'Amour dans cinq mille ans (1908), which he revised for a 1928 edition retitled L'Amour dans 5000 ans. It was one of a number of French romans scientifiques written after the novels of H. G. Wells became popular in France. The story is set in the year 6905, long after Martians, repelled by human cruelty, had almost wiped out a humanity that had been reproducing without restraint. By that point evolution and genetic engineering have turned a ruined Earth into a managed utopia in which reproduction is controlled and romantic love has been done away with. When reproductive material from the 20th century is reintroduced, older human impulses revive and bring about the end of the world. Brian Stableford translated the revised text into English as Love in 5000 Years (2013).

== Selected works ==
- Le Salon de Madame Truphot (1904; reissued 1927)
- Les Aubes mauvaises (1905)
- L'Amour dans cinq mille ans (1908; revised 1928)
- La Grève des ventres (1908)
- Le Crime d'engendrer (1909)
- La Société mourante et le néo-malthusisme (1911)
- Laurent Tailhade : son œuvre (1922)
- Love in 5000 Years (2013, English translation by Brian Stableford)
