= Optiman =

Novel by Brian Stableford

- Author: Brian Stableford
- Publication date: 1980

Optiman is a 1980 science fiction novel by Brian Stableford. It was published in US by DAW Books in October 1980, and a year later, in July 1981, in the UK as War Games, by Pan Books.

== Plot ==
On a far colony, humans, including a genetically engineered protagonist of the novel, fight with aliens over control of the planet.

== Reception ==
The book was reviewed in a number of outlets:

- Review by Colin Greenland in Foundation, #22 June 1981
- Review by Theodore Sturgeon in Rod Serling's The Twilight Zone Magazine, June 1981
- Review by uncredited author in Ad Astra, Issue Sixteen (1981)
- Review by Chris Bailey in Vector 104 (1981)
- Review by Mark Willard in Science Fiction Review, Summer 1982

David Pringle in his The Ultimate Guide to Science Fiction described it as "Imaginative, ironic, more than a little dry".
