= Jacques Van Herp =

Belgian writer (1923–2004)

- Born: 26 November 1923
- Died: 30 December 2004 (aged 81)
- Occupations: Writer, publisher

Jacques Van Herp (26 November 1923 – 30 December 2004) was a Belgian publisher, anthologist, science fiction writer and director of collections at Marabout.

== Biography ==
He initially taught as a mathematics teacher in secondary education in Brussels. He then became director of collections at the Marabout publishing house and specialized in publishing novels written by European forerunners of science fiction, being awarded in 1976 with the Special Prize for Belgium of the European Science Fiction Society.

His anticipation novels were published under several pseudonyms:

- With his only signature: Marc Monnier, Alain Arvel, André Jouly, Michel Berchamps, Carlo Nada, Alan Haigh, Michel Vedewe, Alain Provist, Ladislas Céteski, Illy Kenkönnery, Michel Berchmans, Michel Védéwé.
- Under a collective signature: Michel Jansen, Michel Goissert.

== Critical appraisals ==
Van Herp considered that the countries of the Eastern Bloc had notable anticipatory writers like Stanisław Lem, Ivan Yefremov, the Strugatsky brothers and Valentina Zhuravlyova; but he said Sergiu Fărcășan "crushed" all of them. After reading Fărcășan's novel A Love of the Year 41,042, Van Herp considered the author to be the size of Robert A. Heinlein, Arthur C. Clarke, and Fredric Brown, stating that in Fărcășan's work he saw the logical rigor in extrapolating of the first, the high knowledge of the second, and the cosmic sense as well as the humor of the third. "The comparison seems formidable," Van Herp acknowledged, "but Fărcășan supports it very well (...)".

== Works ==
=== As Alan Haigh ===
- La Porte des ténèbres (Le Masque Fantastique, n° 18, 1977, coll. rouge)

=== As Alain Arvel ===
- La Capricieuse, Alsatia, Signe de Piste, 1958
- Xavier la dérive, Signe de Piste 128, 1986
- Lucky, mon ami, Fleurus, 1995, coll. Signe de Piste
- Thierry tête de fer, Spès, 1954, coll. Jamboree
- Le Roi Mezel (in collaboration with Jean-Claude Alain), Spès, 1954, coll. Jamboree
- Le linceul de pourpre, Spès, 1956, coll. Jamboree
- Terre des Ombres, Spès, 1957, coll. Jamboree
- Cap au Sud (in collaboration with Jean-Paul Benoit), Spès, 1963, coll. Jamboree
- Les murs de la ville, éditions Hachette, 1975, coll. Poche Rouge
- Vorstadtsommer : Bruno, Mike und Rocandos (traduction de Thomas Münster), Freiburg im Breisgau, Basel, Wien : Herder, 1979

=== As Carlo Nada ===
- La bataille du quartier, Signe de Piste, NSDP 53, 1977

=== As André Jouly ===
- Le Prince Milou, Spès, 1957, coll. Jamboree

=== As Jacques Van Herp ===
==== Anthologies ====
- Sur l'autre face du monde et autres romans scientifiques de sciences et voyages (in collaboration with Gérard Klein, Robert Laffont, 1973, coll. Ailleurs et Demain/Classiques)
- l'Angleterre fantastique (de Defoe à Wells, 22 contes de revenants et de terreur) (Éditions André Gérard, 1974, coll. Anthologies)
- Cahiers de l'Herne n° 38 : Jean Ray (in collaboration with François Truchaud, Herne, 1980, coll. Les cahiers de l'Herne, n° 38)
- Fritz Leiber, Les nouvelles, suivies d’une autobiographie (Lefrancq, 1988)

==== Essays, studies, guides ====
- Panorama de la science-fiction (Éditions Gérard & Co, 1974, n° 270, coll. Marabout Université)
- Panorama de la science-fiction (1974-1996) (Lefrancq, coll. Volumes)
- Harry Dickson, le Sherlock Holmes américain Tome 1, Recto-verso, 1981
- Harry Dickson, le Sherlock Holmes américain Tome 2, Recto-verso, 1983

==== Short stories ====
- Rencontre à minuit (1987, Phénix, n° 11)

=== As Michel Jansen ===
==== Novels ====
- Raiders de l'espace (in collaboration with Jean Erland), Spès, 1955, coll. Jamboree
- Vers les espaces infinis, Editions du Soleil levant, 1956
- La porte sous les eaux (in collaboration with John Flanders), Spès, 1960, coll. Jamboree
- Mer des pluies - Spès 1961, coll. Jamboree-ainé
- Port des brumes, Signe de Piste, 1955 (SDP 74)

==== Short stories ====
- Werewolf (1957, Fiction, n° 44)
- Excès de vitesse (1958, Fiction, n° 57)
- La fin du UB-65 (1969 Audace n° 1 - 15me année - Spécial Fantastique
- Poursuite sans fin (1986, Phénix, n° 4)
- De Du'Vel On à Nek (1988, Phénix, n° 15)
- Prima donna (dans la Première Anthologie de la science-fiction française, OPTA, 1959, coll. Fiction-Spécial)
- Si jamais je te pince (1987, Phénix, n° 8)
