= Un habitant de la planète Mars =

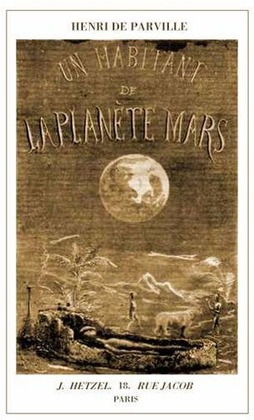
- Editor: J. Hetzel
- Author: Henri de Parville
- Genre: Science-fiction; Canular
- Publication date: 1865

Un habitant de la planète Mars (An Inhabitant of Mars) is a satirical science fiction novel by Henri de Parville that was published in serial form between 1864 and 1865 by the French newspaper Le Pays. It was published in hardback form in 1865 by J. Hetzel. This novel, presented in the style of a scholarly report, recounts the fictional discovery of a Martian mummy in Kansas.

== About ==
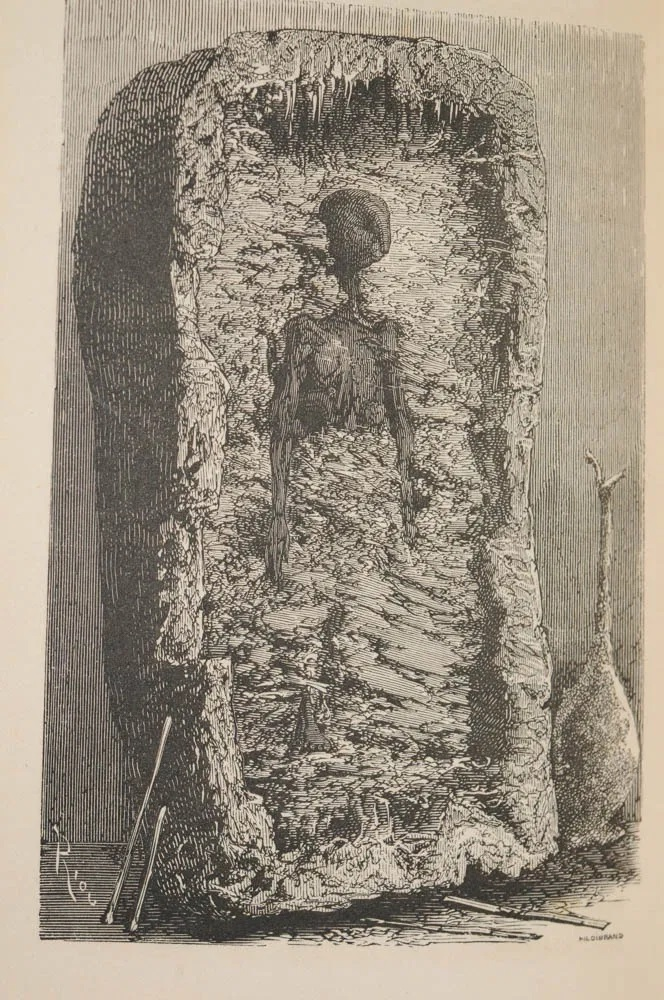
Martian mummy purportedly discovered in Kansas in 1864. Illustration by Édouard Riou.

The article, entitled “An inhabitant of the planet Mars,” appeared in the daily newspaper Le Pays on June 17, 1864. It was initially signed by a certain A. Lomon, a journalist who wrote the newspaper's international dispatches, particularly those dealing with the American Civil War. This hoax continued for six months before being interrupted in January 1865 and culminated in the publication of the book, illustrated by Édouard Riou, in bound format that same year.

Henri de Parville caricaturized the scientific world of his time, but the book remains an educational work in which he presents numerous scientific disciplines.

== Reception ==
This story caused stir in France. One of Henri de Parville's colleagues, the popular science writer Louis Figuier, who did not appreciate the hoax, lamented in an article in the journal L'Année scientifique et industrielle that people could find amusement in the credulity of readers. He also compared this hoax to the New York Sun's 1835 astronomical hoax about the inhabitants of the moon and lamented a "real blow to the credibility of the press in general."

The discovery of Henri de Parville's Martian mummy was mentioned fifty-five years later by Pierre Souvestre on the front page of the magazine L'Auto; then again in 1923, in the children's story Un voyage en rêve by A. Lorbert. Finally, the Martian mummy appears in volume 1 of the comic book series L'Œil de la Nuit (The Eye of the Night), in which it is presented during a lecture at the Sorbonne given by Camille Flammarion.
