= Tales of the Shadowmen =

American anthology

Tales of the Shadowmen is an American anthology of short fiction edited by Jean-Marc Lofficier and Randy Lofficier and published by Black Coat Press. The stories share the conceit of taking place in a fictional world where all of the characters and events from pulp fiction, and in particular French adventure literature, actually exist in the same universe.

== About the series ==
The title and concept of Tales of the Shadowmen were inspired by science fiction writer Philip José Farmer's works centering on the Wold Newton family. The concept first emerged in Jean-Marc Lofficier's non-fiction works, French Science Fiction, Fantasy, Horror & Pulp Fiction: A Guide To Cinema, Television, Radio, Animation, Comic Books And Literature From The Middle Ages To The Present (2000) and Shadowmen: Heroes And Villains Of French Pulp Fiction (2003), which reviewed characters from French popular literature, the latter blending bibliographical information and speculative fiction.

== Table of contents ==
| Volume | Author | Title | Principal character(s) |
|---|---|---|---|
=== Tales of the Shadowmen, Volume 1: The Modern Babylon === Cover by Mike Manley ISBN 1-932983-36-8 (2005)
| 1 | Matthew Baugh | Mask of the Monster | Frankenstein's Monster |
| 1 | Matthew Baugh | Mask of the Monster | Judex |
| 1 | Matthew Baugh | Mask of the Monster | Maigret |
| 1 | Matthew Baugh | Mask of the Monster | Cornelius Kramm |
| 1 | Matthew Baugh | Mask of the Monster | Jules de Grandin |
| 1 | Bill Cunningham | Cadavres Exquis | Fascinax |
| 1 | Bill Cunningham | Cadavres Exquis | Jules de Grandin |
| 1 | Terrance Dicks | When Lemmy Met Jules | Lemmy Caution |
| 1 | Terrance Dicks | When Lemmy Met Jules | Maigret |
| 1 | Win Scott Eckert | The Vanishing Devil | Doc Ardan |
| 1 | Win Scott Eckert | The Vanishing Devil | Roger Gunn |
| 1 | Win Scott Eckert | The Vanishing Devil | Maigret |
| 1 | Win Scott Eckert | The Vanishing Devil | Doctor Natas (i.e. Fu Manchu) |
| 1 | Win Scott Eckert | The Vanishing Devil | Pao Tcheou |
| 1 | Win Scott Eckert | The Vanishing Devil | Caresco |
| 1 | Viviane Etrivert | The Three Jewish Horsemen | Lord Baskerville |
| 1 | Viviane Etrivert | The Three Jewish Horsemen | Josephine Balsamo |
| 1 | Viviane Etrivert | The Three Jewish Horsemen | The Phantom of the Opera |
| 1 | Viviane Etrivert | The Three Jewish Horsemen | Arsène Lupin |
| 1 | G. L. Gick | The Werewolf of Rutherford Grange (part 1) | Harry Dickson |
| 1 | G. L. Gick | The Werewolf of Rutherford Grange (part 1) | Sexton Blake |
| 1 | G. L. Gick | The Werewolf of Rutherford Grange (part 1) | Lord John Roxton |
| 1 | G. L. Gick | The Werewolf of Rutherford Grange (part 1) | Sâr Dubnotal |
| 1 | Rick Lai | The Last Vendetta | Arthur Gordon of Texas |
| 1 | Rick Lai | The Last Vendetta | Ignacz Djanko |
| 1 | Rick Lai | The Last Vendetta | Josephine Balsamo |
| 1 | Rick Lai | The Last Vendetta | Loco |
| 1 | Rick Lai | The Last Vendetta | Huan Tsung Chao |
| 1 | Rick Lai | The Last Vendetta | Oliver Haddo |
| 1 | Rick Lai | The Last Vendetta | Count Bielowsky |
| 1 | Rick Lai | The Last Vendetta | Washburn |
| 1 | Rick Lai | The Last Vendetta | Satanas |
| 1 | Rick Lai | The Last Vendetta | Clyde |
| 1 | Rick Lai | The Last Vendetta | Yolaf Peterson |
| 1 | Alain le Bussy | The Sainte-Geneviève Caper | Arsène Lupin |
| 1 | Jean-Marc Lofficier & Randy Lofficier | Journey to the Center of Chaos | JimGrim |
| 1 | Jean-Marc Lofficier & Randy Lofficier | Journey to the Center of Chaos | Robur |
| 1 | Jean-Marc Lofficier & Randy Lofficier | Journey to the Center of Chaos | Sâr Dubnotal |
| 1 | Jean-Marc Lofficier & Randy Lofficier | Journey to the Center of Chaos | Yog-Sothoth |
| 1 | Samuel T. Payne | Lacunal Visions | Auguste Dupin |
| 1 | Samuel T. Payne | Lacunal Visions | Sergeant Picard |
| 1 | Samuel T. Payne | Lacunal Visions | Master Zacharius |
| 1 | Samuel T. Payne | Lacunal Visions | Doctor Omega |
| 1 | John Peel | The Kind-Hearted Torturer | Auguste Dupin |
| 1 | John Peel | The Kind-Hearted Torturer | The Count of Monte-Cristo |
| 1 | John Peel | The Kind-Hearted Torturer | The Black Coats |
| 1 | Chris Roberson | Penumbra | The Vampires |
| 1 | Chris Roberson | Penumbra | Judex |
| 1 | Chris Roberson | Penumbra | Thomas Wayne, Martha Wayne |
| 1 | Chris Roberson | Penumbra | The Shadow |
| 1 | Robert Sheckley | The Paris-Ganymede Clock | Melville Fairr |
| 1 | Robert Sheckley | The Paris-Ganymede Clock | Fantômas |
| 1 | Robert Sheckley | The Paris-Ganymede Clock | Robin Muscat |
| 1 | Brian Stableford | The Titan Unwrecked; or, Futility Revisited | Allan Quatermain |
| 1 | Brian Stableford | The Titan Unwrecked; or, Futility Revisited | She |
| 1 | Brian Stableford | The Titan Unwrecked; or, Futility Revisited | Dracula |
| 1 | Brian Stableford | The Titan Unwrecked; or, Futility Revisited | John Rowland |
| 1 | Brian Stableford | The Titan Unwrecked; or, Futility Revisited | Captain Black |
=== Tales of the Shadowmen, Volume 2: Gentlemen of the Night === Cover & illustrations by Fernando Calvi ISBN 1-932983-60-0 (2006)
| 2 | Matthew Baugh | Ex Calce Liberatus | Arsène Lupin |
| 2 | Matthew Baugh | Ex Calce Liberatus | Kogoro Akechi |
| 2 | Matthew Baugh | Ex Calce Liberatus | The Vampires |
| 2 | Bill Cunningham | Trauma | The Green Hornet |
| 2 | Bill Cunningham | Trauma | Maigret |
| 2 | Bill Cunningham | Trauma | Fantômas |
| 2 | Win Scott Eckert | The Eye of Oran | Doctor Natas (i.e. Fu Manchu) |
| 2 | Win Scott Eckert | The Eye of Oran | Pao Tcheou |
| 2 | Win Scott Eckert | The Eye of Oran | Fen-Chu |
| 2 | Win Scott Eckert | The Eye of Oran | Oddjob |
| 2 | Win Scott Eckert | The Eye of Oran | La Peste |
| 2 | Win Scott Eckert | The Eye of Oran | Inspector Fabre |
| 2 | Win Scott Eckert | The Eye of Oran | Inspector Fauchet |
| 2 | Win Scott Eckert | The Eye of Oran | Doc Ardan |
| 2 | G. L. Gick | The Werewolf of Rutherford Grange (part 2) | Harry Dickson |
| 2 | G. L. Gick | The Werewolf of Rutherford Grange (part 2) | Sâr Dubnotal |
| 2 | G. L. Gick | The Werewolf of Rutherford Grange (part 2) | Lord John Roxton |
| 2 | Rick Lai | Dr. Cerral's Patient | Dr. Cerral |
| 2 | Rick Lai | Dr. Cerral's Patient | Victor Chupin |
| 2 | Rick Lai | Dr. Cerral's Patient | Arsène Lupin |
| 2 | Serge Lehman | The Mystery of the Yellow Renault | Joseph Rouletabille |
| 2 | Serge Lehman | The Melons of Trafalmadore | Doctor Omega |
| 2 | Serge Lehman | The Melons of Trafalmadore | Hoppy Uniatz |
| 2 | Serge Lehman | The Melons of Trafalmadore | Tralfamadorians |
| 2 | Jean-Marc Lofficier | Arsène Lupin's Christmas | Arsène Lupin |
| 2 | Jean-Marc Lofficier | Figaro's Children | The Phantom of the Opera |
| 2 | Jean-Marc Lofficier | The Tarot of Fantômas | Fantômas |
| 2 | Jean-Marc Lofficier | The Star Prince | Doc Ardan |
| 2 | Jean-Marc Lofficier | The Star Prince | The Little Prince |
| 2 | Jean-Marc Lofficier | Marguerite | Nyctalope |
| 2 | Jean-Marc Lofficier | Lost and Found | Judex |
| 2 | Jean-Marc Lofficier | Lost and Found | Kaspar Gutman |
| 2 | Xavier Mauméjean | Be Seeing You! | Sherlock Holmes |
| 2 | Xavier Mauméjean | Be Seeing You! | Denis Nayland Smith |
| 2 | Xavier Mauméjean | Be Seeing You! | Azzef |
| 2 | Xavier Mauméjean | Be Seeing You! | Ned Hattison |
| 2 | Xavier Mauméjean | Be Seeing You! | Arsène Lupin |
| 2 | Xavier Mauméjean | Be Seeing You! | Winston Churchill |
| 2 | Xavier Mauméjean | Be Seeing You! | The Village |
| 2 | Sylvie Miller & Philippe Ward | The Vanishing Diamonds | Joseph Jorkens |
| 2 | Sylvie Miller & Philippe Ward | The Vanishing Diamonds | Allan Quatermain |
| 2 | Sylvie Miller & Philippe Ward | The Vanishing Diamonds | Captain Nemo |
| 2 | Sylvie Miller & Philippe Ward | The Vanishing Diamonds | Lord Baskerville |
| 2 | Sylvie Miller & Philippe Ward | The Vanishing Diamonds | Hareton Ironcastle |
| 2 | Sylvie Miller & Philippe Ward | The Vanishing Diamonds | The Invisible Man |
| 2 | Sylvie Miller & Philippe Ward | The Vanishing Diamonds | The Time Traveler |
| 2 | Sylvie Miller & Philippe Ward | The Vanishing Diamonds | D'Artagnan |
| 2 | Sylvie Miller & Philippe Ward | The Vanishing Diamonds | Isaac Laquedem |
| 2 | Jess Nevins | A Jest, To Pass The Time | Bernard Sutton |
| 2 | Jess Nevins | A Jest, To Pass The Time | M. Dicky |
| 2 | Jess Nevins | A Jest, To Pass The Time | Zigomar |
| 2 | Jess Nevins | A Jest, To Pass The Time | Baron Stromboli |
| 2 | Jess Nevins | A Jest, To Pass The Time | Colonel Clay |
| 2 | Jess Nevins | A Jest, To Pass The Time | The Lone Wolf |
| 2 | Jess Nevins | A Jest, To Pass The Time | Horace Dorrington |
| 2 | Jess Nevins | A Jest, To Pass The Time | Belphegor |
| 2 | Jess Nevins | A Jest, To Pass The Time | Sigono |
| 2 | Jess Nevins | A Jest, To Pass The Time | Fantômas |
| 2 | Jess Nevins | A Jest, To Pass The Time | Monsieur Zenith |
| 2 | Jess Nevins | A Jest, To Pass The Time | Gaston Dupont |
| 2 | Jess Nevins | A Jest, To Pass The Time | Filip Colin |
| 2 | Jess Nevins | A Jest, To Pass The Time | Ruder-Ox |
| 2 | Jess Nevins | A Jest, To Pass The Time | Mademoiselle Miton |
| 2 | Jess Nevins | A Jest, To Pass The Time | Simon Carne |
| 2 | Jess Nevins | A Jest, To Pass The Time | Lord Stuart |
| 2 | Jess Nevins | A Jest, To Pass The Time | Percy Stuart |
| 2 | Jess Nevins | A Jest, To Pass The Time | Arsène Lupin |
| 2 | Kim Newman | Angels of Music | Christine Daaé |
| 2 | Kim Newman | Angels of Music | Trilby O'Ferrall |
| 2 | Kim Newman | Angels of Music | Irene Adler |
| 2 | Kim Newman | Angels of Music | The Phantom of the Opera |
| 2 | Kim Newman | Angels of Music | Brigadier Gerard |
| 2 | Kim Newman | Angels of Music | Josephine Balsamo |
| 2 | Kim Newman | Angels of Music | Basil Hallward |
| 2 | Kim Newman | Angels of Music | Spalanzani, Cochenille, Coppelius |
| 2 | Kim Newman | Angels of Music | Duke of Omnium |
| 2 | Kim Newman | Angels of Music | Chevalier del Gardo |
| 2 | Kim Newman | Angels of Music | Simon Cordier |
| 2 | Kim Newman | Angels of Music | Walter Parkes Thatcher |
| 2 | John Peel | The Incomplete Assassin | Joseph Rouletabille |
| 2 | John Peel | The Incomplete Assassin | Michel Strogoff |
| 2 | Chris Roberson | Annus Mirabilis | Doctor Omega |
| 2 | Chris Roberson | Annus Mirabilis | The Xipéhuz |
| 2 | Chris Roberson | Annus Mirabilis | Albert Einstein |
| 2 | Jean-Louis Trudel | Legacies | Arsène Lupin |
| 2 | Jean-Louis Trudel | Legacies | Joseph Rouletabille |
| 2 | Jean-Louis Trudel | Legacies | Baron Karl von Hessel |
| 2 | Jean-Louis Trudel | Legacies | Lady Diana Wyndham |
| 2 | Brian Stableford | The Grey Men | Gregory Temple |
| 2 | Brian Stableford | The Grey Men | John Devil |
=== Tales of the Shadowmen, Volume 3: Danse Macabre === Cover & illustrations by Daylon ISBN 1-932983-77-5 (2007)
| 3 | Matthew Baugh | The Heart of the Moon | Doctor Omega |
| 3 | Matthew Baugh | The Heart of the Moon | Telzey Amberdon |
| 3 | Matthew Baugh | The Heart of the Moon | Captain Kronos |
| 3 | Matthew Baugh | The Heart of the Moon | Solomon Kane |
| 3 | Matthew Baugh | The Heart of the Moon | Maciste |
| 3 | Matthew Baugh | The Heart of the Moon | Baron Iscariot |
| 3 | Matthew Baugh | The Heart of the Moon | Count Orlok |
| 3 | Alfredo Castelli | Long Live Fantômas! | Fantômas |
| 3 | Alfredo Castelli | Long Live Fantômas! | The Black Coats |
| 3 | Bill Cunningham | Next! | Barbarella |
| 3 | Bill Cunningham | Next! | James T. Kirk |
| 3 | Bill Cunningham | Next! | The Shadow |
| 3 | François Darnaudet | Au Vent Mauvais... | Madame Atomos |
| 3 | Paul Di Filippo | Return to the 20th Century | The 20th Century |
| 3 | Paul Di Filippo | Return to the 20th Century | Professor Calculus |
| 3 | Paul Di Filippo | Return to the 20th Century | Cat-Women of the Moon |
| 3 | Win Scott Eckert | Les Lèvres Rouges | Elizabeth Bathory |
| 3 | Win Scott Eckert | Les Lèvres Rouges | Nestor Burma |
| 3 | Win Scott Eckert | Les Lèvres Rouges | Doc Ardan |
| 3 | Win Scott Eckert | Les Lèvres Rouges | Montferrand |
| 3 | Win Scott Eckert | Les Lèvres Rouges | Jens Rolf |
| 3 | Win Scott Eckert | Les Lèvres Rouges | Le Chiffre |
| 3 | Win Scott Eckert | Les Lèvres Rouges | Plaster |
| 3 | Win Scott Eckert | Les Lèvres Rouges | Cabiria |
| 3 | Win Scott Eckert | Les Lèvres Rouges | Manon Lescaut |
| 3 | Win Scott Eckert | Les Lèvres Rouges | Audrey |
| 3 | G. L. Gick | Beware the Beasts | Doctor Omega |
| 3 | G. L. Gick | Beware the Beasts | Jinn and Phyllis |
| 3 | Micah Harris | The Ape Gigans | Becky Sharp |
| 3 | Micah Harris | The Ape Gigans | Professor Lidenbrock |
| 3 | Micah Harris | The Ape Gigans | Mahars of Pellucidar |
| 3 | Micah Harris | The Ape Gigans | Obed Marsh |
| 3 | Micah Harris | The Ape Gigans | King Kong |
| 3 | Travis Hiltz | A Dance of Night and Death | The Vampires |
| 3 | Travis Hiltz | A Dance of Night and Death | Fantômas |
| 3 | Rick Lai | The Lady in the Black Gloves | Madame Fourneau |
| 3 | Rick Lai | The Lady in the Black Gloves | Josephine Balsamo |
| 3 | Rick Lai | The Lady in the Black Gloves | Catarina Koluchy |
| 3 | Rick Lai | The Lady in the Black Gloves | The Black Coats |
| 3 | Rick Lai | The Lady in the Black Gloves | Doctor Mabuse |
| 3 | Rick Lai | The Lady in the Black Gloves | Doctor Biron |
| 3 | Rick Lai | The Lady in the Black Gloves | Mary Holder |
| 3 | Rick Lai | The Lady in the Black Gloves | Helen Lipsius |
| 3 | Rick Lai | The Lady in the Black Gloves | Inspector Lefevre |
| 3 | Rick Lai | The Lady in the Black Gloves | Isadora Klein |
| 3 | Jean-Marc Lofficier | The Murder of Randolph Carter | Hercule Poirot |
| 3 | Jean-Marc Lofficier | The Murder of Randolph Carter | Charles Dexter Ward |
| 3 | Jean-Marc Lofficier | The Murder of Randolph Carter | Lavinia Whateley |
| 3 | Xavier Mauméjean | A Day in the Life of Madame Atomos | Madame Atomos |
| 3 | Xavier Mauméjean | A Day in the Life of Madame Atomos | Tania Orloff |
| 3 | Xavier Mauméjean | A Day in the Life of Madame Atomos | Catherine Cornelius |
| 3 | Xavier Mauméjean | A Day in the Life of Madame Atomos | Mephista |
| 3 | Xavier Mauméjean | A Day in the Life of Madame Atomos | Mrs. Butterworth |
| 3 | Xavier Mauméjean | A Day in the Life of Madame Atomos | Vic St Val |
| 3 | Xavier Mauméjean | A Day in the Life of Madame Atomos | Modesty Blaise |
| 3 | David A. McIntee | Bullets Over Bombay | Docteur Mystère |
| 3 | Brad Mengel | All's Fair... | P'Gell |
| 3 | Brad Mengel | All's Fair... | James Bond |
| 3 | Brad Mengel | All's Fair... | Maurice Champot |
| 3 | Brad Mengel | All's Fair... | L'Ombre |
| 3 | Brad Mengel | All's Fair... | OSS 117 |
| 3 | Michael Moorcock | The Affair of the Bassin Les Hivers | Lapointe |
| 3 | Michael Moorcock | The Affair of the Bassin Les Hivers | Zenith the Albino |
| 3 | Michael Moorcock | The Affair of the Bassin Les Hivers | Una Persson |
| 3 | Michael Moorcock | The Affair of the Bassin Les Hivers | The Vampires |
| 3 | Michael Moorcock | The Affair of the Bassin Les Hivers | Vautrin |
| 3 | John Peel | The Successful Failure | Isidore Beautrelet |
| 3 | John Peel | The Successful Failure | Xavier Guichard |
| 3 | John Peel | The Successful Failure | Biggles |
| 3 | Joseph Altairac & Jean-Luc Rivera | The Butterfly Files | William Mulder |
| 3 | Joseph Altairac & Jean-Luc Rivera | The Butterfly Files | Madame Atomos |
| 3 | Chris Roberson | The Famous Ape | Zephir |
| 3 | Chris Roberson | The Famous Ape | Curious George |
| 3 | Chris Roberson | The Famous Ape | Malb'yat |
| 3 | Robert L. Robinson, Jr. | Two Hunters | Tarzan |
| 3 | Robert L. Robinson, Jr. | Two Hunters | Judex |
| 3 | Brian Stableford | The Child Stealers | John Devil |
| 3 | Brian Stableford | The Child Stealers | Cagliostro |
=== Tales of the Shadowmen, Volume 4: Lords of Terror === Cover by José Ladrönn ISBN 978-1-934543-02-3 (2008)
| 4 | Matthew Baugh | Captain Future and the Lunar Peril | Saint-Ménoux |
| 4 | Matthew Baugh | Captain Future and the Lunar Peril | Eric John Stark |
| 4 | Matthew Baugh | Captain Future and the Lunar Peril | Captain Future |
| 4 | Matthew Baugh | Captain Future and the Lunar Peril | Northwest Smith |
| 4 | Matthew Baugh | Captain Future and the Lunar Peril | Gerry Carlyle |
| 4 | Matthew Baugh | Captain Future and the Lunar Peril | Tara of Helium |
| 4 | Bill Cunningham | Fool Me Once... | Harry Dickson |
| 4 | Bill Cunningham | Fool Me Once... | Fascinax |
| 4 | Win Scott Eckert | The Atomos Affair | Madame Atomos |
| 4 | Win Scott Eckert | The Atomos Affair | Alexander Waverly |
| 4 | Micah Harris | The Anti-Pope of Avignon | Solomon Kane |
| 4 | Micah Harris | The Anti-Pope of Avignon | Fausta |
| 4 | Micah Harris | The Anti-Pope of Avignon | The Horla |
| 4 | Travis Hiltz | Three Men, A Martian and A Baby | Doctor Omega |
| 4 | Travis Hiltz | Three Men, A Martian and A Baby | Kal-L |
| 4 | Travis Hiltz | Three Men, A Martian and A Baby | Selenites |
| 4 | Rick Lai | Corridors of Deceit | The Black Coats |
| 4 | Rick Lai | Corridors of Deceit | Catarina Koluchy |
| 4 | Rick Lai | Corridors of Deceit | Count Corbucci |
| 4 | Rick Lai | Corridors of Deceit | Antonio Nikola |
| 4 | Rick Lai | Corridors of Deceit | Josephine Balsamo |
| 4 | Rick Lai | Corridors of Deceit | Fantômas |
| 4 | Rick Lai | Corridors of Deceit | Anna Beringer |
| 4 | Rick Lai | Corridors of Deceit | Mary Holder |
| 4 | Rick Lai | Corridors of Deceit | Dr. Mabuse |
| 4 | Roman Leary | The Evils Against Which We Strive | Sâr Dubnotal |
| 4 | Roman Leary | The Evils Against Which We Strive | The Shadow |
| 4 | Roman Leary | The Evils Against Which We Strive | Ligeia |
| 4 | Jean-Marc Lofficier | Madame Atomos' Christmas | Madame Atomos |
| 4 | Randy Lofficier | The Reluctant Princess | Doc Ardan |
| 4 | Randy Lofficier | The Reluctant Princess | Sleeping Beauty |
| 4 | Randy Lofficier | The Reluctant Princess | Joseph Rouletabille |
| 4 | Xavier Mauméjean | A Wooster Christmas | Bertie Wooster |
| 4 | Xavier Mauméjean | A Wooster Christmas | Hercule Poirot |
| 4 | Jess Nevins | Red in Tooth and Claw | Rocambole |
| 4 | Jess Nevins | Red in Tooth and Claw | Lord Speedicut |
| 4 | Jess Nevins | Red in Tooth and Claw | John Sinnat |
| 4 | Jess Nevins | Red in Tooth and Claw | Coyle |
| 4 | Jess Nevins | Red in Tooth and Claw | Inspector Bucket |
| 4 | Jess Nevins | Red in Tooth and Claw | Sergeant Cuff |
| 4 | Kim Newman | Angels of Music 2: The Mark of Kane | The Phantom of the Opera |
| 4 | Kim Newman | Angels of Music 2: The Mark of Kane | Charles Foster Kane |
| 4 | Kim Newman | Angels of Music 2: The Mark of Kane | Gigi |
| 4 | Kim Newman | Angels of Music 2: The Mark of Kane | Eliza Doolittle |
| 4 | Kim Newman | Angels of Music 2: The Mark of Kane | Rima |
| 4 | Kim Newman | Angels of Music 2: The Mark of Kane | Haghi |
| 4 | Kim Newman | Angels of Music 2: The Mark of Kane | Perry Bennett |
| 4 | Kim Newman | Angels of Music 2: The Mark of Kane | Madame Sara |
| 4 | Kim Newman | Angels of Music 2: The Mark of Kane | Dunston Gryme |
| 4 | Kim Newman | Angels of Music 2: The Mark of Kane | Simon Carne |
| 4 | Kim Newman | Angels of Music 2: The Mark of Kane | Baron Maupertuis |
| 4 | Kim Newman | Angels of Music 2: The Mark of Kane | Dr. Quartz |
| 4 | Kim Newman | Angels of Music 2: The Mark of Kane | Raymond Owen |
| 4 | Kim Newman | Angels of Music 2: The Mark of Kane | Voltaire |
| 4 | Kim Newman | Angels of Music 2: The Mark of Kane | Mr. Potter |
| 4 | Kim Newman | Angels of Music 2: The Mark of Kane | William Boltyn |
| 4 | Kim Newman | Angels of Music 2: The Mark of Kane | Gurn/Fantômas |
| 4 | Kim Newman | Angels of Music 2: The Mark of Kane | General Sternwood |
| 4 | Kim Newman | Angels of Music 2: The Mark of Kane | Joseph Harrison Paine |
| 4 | Kim Newman | Angels of Music 2: The Mark of Kane | Julian Karswell |
| 4 | Kim Newman | Angels of Music 2: The Mark of Kane | Natasha |
| 4 | Kim Newman | Angels of Music 2: The Mark of Kane | The Face |
| 4 | Kim Newman | Angels of Music 2: The Mark of Kane | Emeric Belasco |
| 4 | Kim Newman | Angels of Music 2: The Mark of Kane | Colonel Moran |
| 4 | Kim Newman | Angels of Music 2: The Mark of Kane | Bret Maverick |
| 4 | John Peel | Twenty Thousand Years Under the Sea | Captain Nemo |
| 4 | John Peel | Twenty Thousand Years Under the Sea | Suydam |
| 4 | John Peel | Twenty Thousand Years Under the Sea | Cthulhu |
| 4 | Steven A. Roman | Night's Children | Irma Vep |
| 4 | Steven A. Roman | Night's Children | Count Orlock |
| 4 | John Shirley | Cyrano and the Two Plumes | Alcandre |
| 4 | John Shirley | Cyrano and the Two Plumes | Cyrano de Bergerac |
| 4 | John Shirley | Cyrano and the Two Plumes | D'Artagnan |
| 4 | Brian Stableford | The Return of Frankenstein | Ned Knob |
| 4 | Brian Stableford | The Return of Frankenstein | Frankenstein's Monster |
| 4 | Brian Stableford | The Return of Frankenstein | Victor Frankenstein |
| 4 | Brian Stableford | The Return of Frankenstein | Malo de Treguern |
| 4 | Brian Stableford | The Return of Frankenstein | Gregory Temple |
=== Tales of the Shadowmen, Volume 5: The Vampires of Paris === Cover by Alan Weiss and Lovern Kindzierski ISBN 978-1-934543-50-4 (2009)
| 5 | Michelle Bigot | The Tarot of the Shadowmen | art portfolio |
| 5 | Matthew Baugh | The Way of the Crane | Kato |
| 5 | Matthew Baugh | The Way of the Crane | Madame Atomos |
| 5 | Christopher Paul Carey & Win Scott Eckert | Iron and Bronze | Hareton Ironcastle |
| 5 | Christopher Paul Carey & Win Scott Eckert | Iron and Bronze | Harry Killer |
| 5 | Christopher Paul Carey & Win Scott Eckert | Iron and Bronze | Antinea |
| 5 | Christopher Paul Carey & Win Scott Eckert | Iron and Bronze | Doc Ardan |
| 5 | Christopher Paul Carey & Win Scott Eckert | Iron and Bronze | The Wandarobo |
| 5 | G. L. Gick | Tros Must Be Crazy! | Tros of Samothrace |
| 5 | G. L. Gick | Tros Must Be Crazy! | Asterix |
| 5 | Micah Harris | May the Ground Not Consume Thee... | Count of Monte-Cristo |
| 5 | Micah Harris | May the Ground Not Consume Thee... | Lord Ruthven |
| 5 | Tom Kane | The Knave of Diamonds | Francisco Scaramanga |
| 5 | Tom Kane | The Knave of Diamonds | Sir Stephen |
| 5 | Lovern Kindzierski | Perils Over Paris | Fascinax |
| 5 | Lovern Kindzierski | Perils Over Paris | The Vampires |
| 5 | Rick Lai | All Predators Great and Small | The Vampires |
| 5 | Rick Lai | All Predators Great and Small | Eugenia von Frankenhausen |
| 5 | Rick Lai | All Predators Great and Small | Captain Thompson |
| 5 | Rick Lai | All Predators Great and Small | Dracula |
| 5 | Rick Lai | All Predators Great and Small | Josephine Balsamo |
| 5 | Rick Lai | All Predators Great and Small | The Black Coats |
| 5 | Roman Leary | The Heart of a Man | Giraud |
| 5 | Roman Leary | The Heart of a Man | Ernst Stavro Blofeld |
| 5 | Roman Leary | The Heart of a Man | Nyctalope |
| 5 | Alain le Bussy | A Matther Without Gravity | Lord Beltham |
| 5 | Alain le Bussy | A Matther Without Gravity | Sherlock Holmes |
| 5 | Alain le Bussy | A Matther Without Gravity | Professor Cavor |
| 5 | Alain le Bussy | A Matther Without Gravity | The Time Traveler |
| 5 | Alain le Bussy | A Matther Without Gravity | H. G. Wells |
| 5 | Jean-Marc Lofficier | Madame Atomos' Holidays | Madame Atomos |
| 5 | Jean-Marc Lofficier | Madame Atomos' Holidays | The Yellow Shadow |
| 5 | Randy Lofficier | The English Gentleman's Ball | The Phantom Angel |
| 5 | Randy Lofficier | The English Gentleman's Ball | Belphégor |
| 5 | Randy Lofficier | The English Gentleman's Ball | Bertie Wooster |
| 5 | Xavier Mauméjean | The Most Exciting Game | The First Mate |
| 5 | Xavier Mauméjean | The Most Exciting Game | Purley Stebbins |
| 5 | Xavier Mauméjean | The Most Exciting Game | John Markham |
| 5 | Xavier Mauméjean | The Most Exciting Game | Margo Lane |
| 5 | Xavier Mauméjean | The Most Exciting Game | Count Zaroff |
| 5 | Xavier Mauméjean | The Most Exciting Game | Serpent Men |
| 5 | Jess Nevins | A Root That Beareth Gall and Worms | Dr. Loveless |
| 5 | Jess Nevins | A Root That Beareth Gall and Worms | Monsieur Lecoq |
| 5 | Jess Nevins | A Root That Beareth Gall and Worms | Raphaël Carot |
| 5 | Jess Nevins | A Root That Beareth Gall and Worms | Hector Ratichon |
| 5 | Jess Nevins | A Root That Beareth Gall and Worms | Alejandro de la Vega |
| 5 | Jess Nevins | A Root That Beareth Gall and Worms | Jules Poiret |
| 5 | Jess Nevins | A Root That Beareth Gall and Worms | Isadore Persano |
| 5 | Jess Nevins | A Root That Beareth Gall and Worms | Zigomar |
| 5 | John Peel | The Dynamics of an Asteroid | Doctor Omega |
| 5 | John Peel | The Dynamics of an Asteroid | Professor Moriarty |
| 5 | John Peel | The Dynamics of an Asteroid | Zephyrin Xirdal |
| 5 | Frank Schildiner | The Smoking Mirror | Jean Kariven |
| 5 | Frank Schildiner | The Smoking Mirror | Inspector Cramer |
| 5 | Stuart Shiffman | The Milkman Cometh | Joseph Rouletabille |
| 5 | Stuart Shiffman | The Milkman Cometh | Tevye |
| 5 | Stuart Shiffman | The Milkman Cometh | Boris Badenov |
| 5 | Stuart Shiffman | The Milkman Cometh | Sylvia di Murska |
| 5 | Stuart Shiffman | The Milkman Cometh | Sherlock Holmes |
| 5 | David L. Vineyard | The Jade Buddha | Arsène Lupin |
| 5 | David L. Vineyard | The Jade Buddha | Hanoi Shan |
| 5 | David L. Vineyard | The Jade Buddha | Henri de Beaujolais |
| 5 | David L. Vineyard | The Jade Buddha | Thibaut Corday |
| 5 | David L. Vineyard | The Jade Buddha | Denis Nayland Smith |
| 5 | Brian Stableford | The Vampire in Paris | Gregory Temple |
| 5 | Brian Stableford | The Vampire in Paris | Jean-Pierre Severin |
| 5 | Brian Stableford | The Vampire in Paris | Countess Marcian Gregoryi |
| 5 | Brian Stableford | The Vampire in Paris | Frankenstein's Monster |
| 5 | Brian Stableford | The Vampire in Paris | Robert Walton |
| 5 | Brian Stableford | The Vampire in Paris | Giuseppe Balsamo |
| 5 | Brian Stableford | The Vampire in Paris | Malo de Treguern |
=== Tales of the Shadowmen, Volume 6: Grand Guignol === Cover by Christine Clavel ISBN 978-1-935558-00-2 (2009)
| 6 | Christopher Paul Carey | Caesar's Children | Maximilian Petion |
| 6 | Christopher Paul Carey | Caesar's Children | The Ponto Family |
| 6 | Christopher Paul Carey | Caesar's Children | Pantagruel |
| 6 | Christopher Paul Carey | Caesar's Children | François Sarrasin |
| 6 | Win Scott Eckert | Is He in Hell? | Scarlet Pimpernel |
| 6 | Win Scott Eckert | Is He in Hell? | Albert Lecoq |
| 6 | Win Scott Eckert | Is He in Hell? | Léonox |
| 6 | Win Scott Eckert | Is He in Hell? | Alice Clarke Raffles |
| 6 | Emmanuel Gorlier | Out of Time | Nyctalope |
| 6 | Emmanuel Gorlier | Out of Time | Bob Morane |
| 6 | Emmanuel Gorlier | Out of Time | Manse Everard |
| 6 | Matthew Baugh & Micah Harris | The Scorpion and the Fox | Becky Sharp |
| 6 | Matthew Baugh & Micah Harris | The Scorpion and the Fox | Rakhmetov |
| 6 | Matthew Baugh & Micah Harris | The Scorpion and the Fox | Joly |
| 6 | Matthew Baugh & Micah Harris | The Scorpion and the Fox | C. Auguste Dupin |
| 6 | Matthew Baugh & Micah Harris | The Scorpion and the Fox | Clampin |
| 6 | Matthew Baugh & Micah Harris | The Scorpion and the Fox | The Yellow Shadow |
| 6 | Travis Hiltz | The Treasure of the Ubasti | Banks and Captain Hood |
| 6 | Travis Hiltz | The Treasure of the Ubasti | Sâr Dubnotal |
| 6 | Travis Hiltz | The Treasure of the Ubasti | Henry Jones, Sr. |
| 6 | Travis Hiltz | The Treasure of the Ubasti | Mowgli |
| 6 | Rick Lai | Incident in the Boer War | A. J. Raffles |
| 6 | Rick Lai | Incident in the Boer War | Fantômas |
| 6 | Roman Leary | The Children of Heracles | Nyctalope |
| 6 | Roman Leary | The Children of Heracles | Bernard Quatermass |
| 6 | Roman Leary | The Children of Heracles | Steve Karnes |
| 6 | Roman Leary | The Children of Heracles | Jeffrey Stuart |
| 6 | Roman Leary | The Children of Heracles | Tony Vincenzo |
| 6 | Roman Leary | The Children of Heracles | The Master |
| 6 | Roman Leary | The Children of Heracles | Big Bad John |
| 6 | Roman Leary | The Children of Heracles | Jack Evans |
| 6 | Jean-Marc Lofficier | J.C. in Alphaville | Leonard and Natasha Von Braun |
| 6 | Jean-Marc Lofficier | J.C. in Alphaville | Henry Dickson |
| 6 | Jean-Marc Lofficier | J.C. in Alphaville | Rotwang |
| 6 | Jean-Marc Lofficier | J.C. in Alphaville | Ohisver Müller |
| 6 | Jean-Marc Lofficier | J.C. in Alphaville | Klamm and Erlanger |
| 6 | Jean-Marc Lofficier | J.C. in Alphaville | Jerry Cornelius |
| 6 | Jean-Marc Lofficier | J.C. in Alphaville | Jack Lint |
| 6 | Jean-Marc Lofficier | J.C. in Alphaville | Una Persson |
| 6 | Jean-Marc Lofficier | J.C. in Alphaville | Père Ubu |
| 6 | Randy Lofficier | The Spear of Destiny | The Phantom Angel |
| 6 | Randy Lofficier | The Spear of Destiny | Gaston Sainclair |
| 6 | Randy Lofficier | The Spear of Destiny | Belphégor |
| 6 | Xavier Mauméjean | The Man for the Job | Carson |
| 6 | Xavier Mauméjean | The Man for the Job | The Pied Piper |
| 6 | William P. Maynard | Yes, Virginia, There is a Fantômas | Fantômas |
| 6 | William P. Maynard | Yes, Virginia, There is a Fantômas | Inspector Morand |
| 6 | William P. Maynard | Yes, Virginia, There is a Fantômas | Sergeant Janvier |
| 6 | William P. Maynard | Yes, Virginia, There is a Fantômas | Jules Poiret |
| 6 | William P. Maynard | Yes, Virginia, There is a Fantômas | Tintin Blanchard |
| 6 | William P. Maynard | Yes, Virginia, There is a Fantômas | Père Menou-Segrais |
| 6 | John Peel | The Biggest Guns | Doc Ardan |
| 6 | John Peel | The Biggest Guns | Hans von Hammer |
| 6 | John Peel | The Biggest Guns | J. T. Maston |
| 6 | John Peel | The Biggest Guns | Lord John Roxton |
| 6 | John Peel | The Biggest Guns | Patricia |
| 6 | Neil Penswick | The Vampire Murders | Harry Dickson |
| 6 | Dennis E. Power | No Good Deed... | Jean Passepartout |
| 6 | Dennis E. Power | No Good Deed... | Père Tabaret and Inspector Gévrol |
| 6 | Dennis E. Power | No Good Deed... | C. Auguste Dupin |
| 6 | Frank Schildiner | Laurels for the Toff | Jean Kariven |
| 6 | Frank Schildiner | Laurels for the Toff | The Toff |
| 6 | Frank Schildiner | Laurels for the Toff | Charles Luke |
| 6 | Bradley H. Sinor | Where the Shadows Began... | Inspector Legrasse |
| 6 | Bradley H. Sinor | Where the Shadows Began... | Michel Ardan |
| 6 | Bradley H. Sinor | Where the Shadows Began... | Cassilda |
| 6 | Bradley H. Sinor | Where the Shadows Began... | H. P. Lovecraft |
| 6 | Bradley H. Sinor | Where the Shadows Began... | Frank Belknap Long |
| 6 | Michel Stéphan | The Red Silk Scarf | Harry Dickson |
| 6 | Michel Stéphan | The Red Silk Scarf | Daisuke Serizawa |
| 6 | Michel Stéphan | The Red Silk Scarf | Madame Atomos |
| 6 | Michel Stéphan | The Red Silk Scarf | Ashenden |
| 6 | Michel Stéphan | The Red Silk Scarf | Fascinax |
| 6 | David L. Vineyard | The Children's Crusade | Harry Lime |
| 6 | David L. Vineyard | The Children's Crusade | Arsène Lupin |
| 6 | David L. Vineyard | The Children's Crusade | Modesty Blaise |
| 6 | David L. Vineyard | The Children's Crusade | Gregory Arkadin |
| 6 | Brian Stableford | Where Zombies Armies Clash By Night | Ned Knob |
| 6 | Brian Stableford | Where Zombies Armies Clash By Night | Germain Patou |
=== Tales of the Shadowmen, Volume 7: Femmes Fatales === Cover by Phil Cohen ISBN 978-1-935558-44-6 (2010)
| 7 | Roberto Lionel Barreiro | Secrets | Jean Valjean |
| 7 | Roberto Lionel Barreiro | Secrets | Zorro |
| 7 | Matthew Baugh | What Rough Beast | Hugo Danner |
| 7 | Matthew Baugh | What Rough Beast | Judex |
| 7 | Matthew Baugh | What Rough Beast | Sâr Dubnotal |
| 7 | Matthew Baugh | What Rough Beast | Doctor von Meyer |
| 7 | Thom Brannan | What Doesn't Die | Frankenstein's monster |
| 7 | Thom Brannan | What Doesn't Die | Bride of Frankenstein |
| 7 | Thom Brannan | What Doesn't Die | Doctor Omega |
| 7 | Thom Brannan | What Doesn't Die | George Westinghouse |
| 7 | Thom Brannan | What Doesn't Die | Nikola Tesla |
| 7 | Matthew Dennion | Faces of Fear | Judex |
| 7 | Matthew Dennion | Faces of Fear | Freddy Krueger |
| 7 | Win Scott Eckert | Nadine's Invitation | Lady Blakeney |
| 7 | Win Scott Eckert | Nadine's Invitation | The Black Coats |
| 7 | Emmanuel Gorlier | Fiat Lux! | Nyctalope |
| 7 | Emmanuel Gorlier | Fiat Lux! | The Invaders |
| 7 | Micah Harris | Slouching Towards Camulodunum | Becky Sharp |
| 7 | Micah Harris | Slouching Towards Camulodunum | Sâr Dubnotal |
| 7 | Micah Harris | Slouching Towards Camulodunum | Richard Upton Pickman |
| 7 | Travis Hiltz | The Robots of Metropolis | Doctor Omega |
| 7 | Travis Hiltz | The Robots of Metropolis | Rotwang |
| 7 | Paul Hugli | Death to the Heretic! | Bruce Wayne |
| 7 | Paul Hugli | Death to the Heretic! | Indiana Jones |
| 7 | Paul Hugli | Death to the Heretic! | Nyctalope |
| 7 | Rick Lai | Will There Be Sunlight? | John Sunlight |
| 7 | Rick Lai | Will There Be Sunlight? | Zemba |
| 7 | Rick Lai | Will There Be Sunlight? | The Black Coats |
| 7 | Jean-Marc Lofficier | The Sincerest Form of Flattery | Diabolik |
| 7 | Jean-Marc Lofficier | The Sincerest Form of Flattery | Fantômas |
| 7 | David McDonnell | Big Little Man | Dr. Loveless |
| 7 | David McDonnell | Big Little Man | Nurse Ratched |
| 7 | Brad Mengel | The Apprentice | The Saint |
| 7 | Brad Mengel | The Apprentice | Malko Linge |
| 7 | Sharan Newman | The Beast Without | Catherine Levendeur |
| 7 | Sharan Newman | The Beast Without | Bisclavret |
| 7 | Neil Penswick | Legacy of Evil | Fu Manchu |
| 7 | Neil Penswick | Legacy of Evil | Le Poisson Chinois |
| 7 | Pete Rawlik | The Masquerade in Exile | Herbert West |
| 7 | Pete Rawlik | The Masquerade in Exile | Christine Daae |
| 7 | Pete Rawlik | The Masquerade in Exile | Erich Zann |
| 7 | Frank Schildiner | The Tiny Destroyer | Jean Kariven |
| 7 | Frank Schildiner | The Tiny Destroyer | Kato |
| 7 | Stuart Shiffman | Grim Days | Lord Peter |
| 7 | Stuart Shiffman | Grim Days | Colonel Haki |
| 7 | Bradley H. Sinor | The Screeching of Two Ravens | Captain Blood |
| 7 | Bradley H. Sinor | The Screeching of Two Ravens | Milady de Winter |
| 7 | Brian Stableford | The Necromancers of London | Gregory Temple |
| 7 | Brian Stableford | The Necromancers of London | Victor Frankenstein |
| 7 | Brian Stableford | The Necromancers of London | Count Szandor |
| 7 | Michel Stéphan | The Three Lives of Maddalena | Victor Frankenstein |
| 7 | Michel Stéphan | The Three Lives of Maddalena | Carmilla |
| 7 | David L. Vineyard | The Mysterious Island of Dr. Antekirtt | Bob Morane |
| 7 | David L. Vineyard | The Mysterious Island of Dr. Antekirtt | Bernard Prince |
| 7 | David L. Vineyard | The Mysterious Island of Dr. Antekirtt | Nyctalope |
| 7 | David L. Vineyard | The Mysterious Island of Dr. Antekirtt | Dr. No |
=== Tales of the Shadowmen, Volume 8: Agents Provocateurs === Cover by Jean-Claude Claeys. ISBN 978-1-61227-050-0 (2011)
| 8 | Matthew Baugh | Don Camillo and the Secret Weapon | Don Camillo |
| 8 | Matthew Baugh | Don Camillo and the Secret Weapon | Eva Kant |
| 8 | Matthew Baugh | Don Camillo and the Secret Weapon | Avakoum Zahov |
| 8 | Matthew Baugh | Don Camillo and the Secret Weapon | James Bond |
| 8 | Nicholas Boving | The Elfberg Red | Rudolf Rassendyll and Rupert of Hentzau |
| 8 | Nicholas Boving | The Elfberg Red | Josephine Balsamo |
| 8 | Nicholas Boving | The Elfberg Red | Dr. Watson and Mrs. Hudson |
| 8 | Nicholas Boving | The Elfberg Red | Raffles and Bunny Manders |
| 8 | Matthew Dennion | The Most Dreadful Monster | Madame Atomos |
| 8 | Matthew Dennion | The Most Dreadful Monster | Bruce Banner |
| 8 | Win Scott Eckert | Marguerite's Tears | Percy Blakeney |
| 8 | Win Scott Eckert | Marguerite's Tears | Violet and Siger Holmes |
| 8 | Win Scott Eckert | Marguerite's Tears | The Black Coats |
| 8 | John Gallagher | The Books of Shadows | art portfolio |
| 8 | Martin Gately | Leviathan's Creek | Joseph Rouletabille |
| 8 | Martin Gately | Leviathan's Creek | Captain Mors |
| 8 | Micah Harris | Slouching Towards Camulodunum (part 2) | Becky Sharp |
| 8 | Micah Harris | Slouching Towards Camulodunum (part 2) | Sâr Dubnotal |
| 8 | Travis Hiltz | In the Caves of the Serpent | El Borak |
| 8 | Travis Hiltz | In the Caves of the Serpent | Orlando |
| 8 | Travis Hiltz | In the Caves of the Serpent | The Wandering Jew |
| 8 | Paul Hugli | Sleep No More! | Harry Dickson |
| 8 | Paul Hugli | Sleep No More! | The Spider |
| 8 | Paul Hugli | Sleep No More! | Doctor Skull |
| 8 | Rick Lai | Vampire Renaissance | Count Dracula |
| 8 | Rick Lai | Vampire Renaissance | Countess Marcian Gregoryi |
| 8 | Joseph Lamere | Satan's Signature | Auguste Dupin |
| 8 | Joseph Lamere | Satan's Signature | Sherlock Holmes |
| 8 | Joseph Lamere | Satan's Signature | Dr. Jekyll |
| 8 | Olivier Legrand | Lost in Averoigne | Jules de Grandin |
| 8 | Olivier Legrand | Lost in Averoigne | Jirel of Joiry |
| 8 | Olivier Legrand | Lost in Averoigne | Doctor Omega |
| 8 | Jean-Marc Lofficier & Randy Lofficier | The Affair of the Necklace Revisited | The Avenger |
| 8 | Jean-Marc Lofficier & Randy Lofficier | The Affair of the Necklace Revisited | Judex |
| 8 | David McDonald | Catspaw | Flashman's son |
| 8 | David McDonald | Catspaw | Nyctalope's father |
| 8 | David McDonald | Catspaw | Dr. Moreau |
| 8 | Christofer Nigro | Patricide | The Phantom of the Opera |
| 8 | Christofer Nigro | Patricide | Frankenstein's Monster |
| 8 | Christofer Nigro | Patricide | Dr. Cornelius |
| 8 | John Peel | More Imaginative Sins | Carnacki |
| 8 | John Peel | More Imaginative Sins | Madame Palmyre |
| 8 | Dennis E. Power | Passing through the Hands of Steel | Passepartout |
| 8 | Dennis E. Power | Passing through the Hands of Steel | Johnny Brainerd |
| 8 | Dennis E. Power | Passing through the Hands of Steel | Winnetou |
| 8 | Pete Rawlik | Before the War, Five Dragons Roar | Charlie Chan |
| 8 | Pete Rawlik | Before the War, Five Dragons Roar | Mr. Moto |
| 8 | Pete Rawlik | Before the War, Five Dragons Roar | Madame Atomos |
| 8 | Joshua Reynolds | The Carolingian Stone | Jim Anthony |
| 8 | Joshua Reynolds | The Carolingian Stone | Belphegor |
| 8 | Joshua Reynolds | The Carolingian Stone | Jan Mayen |
| 8 | Joshua Reynolds | The Carolingian Stone | Chantecoq |
| 8 | Frank Schildiner | The Death Bird | Jean Kariven |
| 8 | Frank Schildiner | The Death Bird | Albert Campion |
| 8 | Michel Stéphan | With the Compliments of Nestor Burma! | Nestor Burma |
| 8 | Michel Stéphan | With the Compliments of Nestor Burma! | Madame Atomos |
| 8 | Michel Vannereux | The Warlord of Vaha | John Carter |
| 8 | Michel Vannereux | The Warlord of Vaha | Cal of Terra |
=== Tales of the Shadowmen, Volume 9: La Vie en Noir === Cover by Nathalie Lial. ISBN 978-1-61227-145-3 (2012)
| 9 | Matthew Baugh | Tournament of the Treasure | Steve Costigan |
| 9 | Matthew Baugh | Tournament of the Treasure | Ned Dargan |
| 9 | Matthew Baugh | Tournament of the Treasure | Townsend Harper and Virginia Harper |
| 9 | Matthew Baugh | Tournament of the Treasure | Madame Ingomar |
| 9 | Matthew Baugh | Tournament of the Treasure | Fatala |
| 9 | Matthew Baugh | Tournament of the Treasure | Mullargan |
| 9 | Matthew Baugh | Tournament of the Treasure | Gutman and Cairo |
| 9 | Matthew Baugh | Tournament of the Treasure | Butch O'Leary |
| 9 | Matthew Baugh | Tournament of the Treasure | Marius |
| 9 | Matthew Baugh | Tournament of the Treasure | Jack Holligan |
| 9 | Nicholas Boving | Wings of Fear | Harry Dickson |
| 9 | Nicholas Boving | Wings of Fear | Bulldog Drummond |
| 9 | Nicholas Boving | Wings of Fear | Richard Hannay |
| 9 | Nicholas Boving | Wings of Fear | Doctor Lerne |
| 9 | Robert Darvel | The Man With the Double Heart | Nyctalope |
| 9 | Matthew Dennion | The Treasure of Everlasting Life | Allan Quatermain |
| 9 | Matthew Dennion | The Treasure of Everlasting Life | Dr. Loveless |
| 9 | Matthew Dennion | The Treasure of Everlasting Life | Doctor Dolittle |
| 9 | Matthew Dennion | The Treasure of Everlasting Life | The Black Coats |
| 9 | Win Scott Eckert | Violet's Lament | Lady Blakeney |
| 9 | Win Scott Eckert | Violet's Lament | Nadine Carody |
| 9 | Win Scott Eckert | Violet's Lament | The Black Coats |
| 9 | Martin Gately | Wolf at the Door of Time | Doctor Omega |
| 9 | Martin Gately | Wolf at the Door of Time | Moses Nebogipfel |
| 9 | Martin Gately | Wolf at the Door of Time | Nyctalope |
| 9 | Travis Hiltz | What Lurks in Romney Marsh? | Doctor Omega |
| 9 | Travis Hiltz | What Lurks in Romney Marsh? | Doctor Syn |
| 9 | Paul Hugli | As Time Goes By... | Doctor Omega |
| 9 | Paul Hugli | As Time Goes By... | Rick Blaine |
| 9 | Rick Lai | Gods of the Underworld | The Black Coats |
| 9 | Rick Lai | Gods of the Underworld | Vautrin |
| 9 | Jean-Marc Lofficier | Dad | Glinda of Oz |
| 9 | Nigel Malcolm | To Dust and Ashes, in its Heat Consuming | Harry Dickson |
| 9 | Nigel Malcolm | To Dust and Ashes, in its Heat Consuming | Bernard Quatermass |
| 9 | David McDonald | Diplomatic Freeze | Flashman's son |
| 9 | David McDonald | Diplomatic Freeze | Nyctalope's father |
| 9 | David McDonald | Diplomatic Freeze | The People of the Pole |
| 9 | Christofer Nigro | Death of a Dream | The Phantom of the Opera |
| 9 | Christofer Nigro | Death of a Dream | The Black Coats |
| 9 | Christofer Nigro | Death of a Dream | Domino Lady |
| 9 | John Peel | The Benevolent Burglar | Maigret |
| 9 | John Peel | The Benevolent Burglar | Simon Templar |
| 9 | John Peel | The Benevolent Burglar | J. G. Reeder |
| 9 | Neil Penswick | The Conspiracy of Silence | Fantômas |
| 9 | Pete Rawlik | Professor Peaslee Plays Paris | The Black Coats |
| 9 | Pete Rawlik | Professor Peaslee Plays Paris | Hercule Flambeau |
| 9 | Pete Rawlik | Professor Peaslee Plays Paris | Professor Peaslee |
| 9 | Joshua Reynolds | Nestor Burma Goes West | Jim Anthony |
| 9 | Joshua Reynolds | Nestor Burma Goes West | Nestor Burma |
| 9 | Joshua Reynolds | Nestor Burma Goes West | Irma Vep |
| 9 | Frank Schildiner | The True Cost of Doing Business | The Black Coats |
| 9 | Frank Schildiner | The True Cost of Doing Business | Mr. Big |
| 9 | Bradley H. Sinor | The Silence | John Carter |
| 9 | Bradley H. Sinor | The Silence | Sebastian Moran |
| 9 | Bradley H. Sinor | The Silence | Michel Ardan |
| 9 | Michel Stéphan | Vampire in the Fist | Irma Vep |
=== Tales of the Shadowmen, Volume 10: Esprit de Corps === Cover by Jean-Michel Nicollet. ISBN 978-1-61227-237-5 (2013)
| 10 | Matthew Baugh | Quest of the Vourdalaki | Boris Liatoukine |
| 10 | Matthew Baugh | Quest of the Vourdalaki | The Master |
| 10 | Matthew Baugh | Quest of the Vourdalaki | Khlit the Cossack |
| 10 | Matthew Baugh | Quest of the Vourdalaki | Quentin Cassave |
| 10 | Nicholas Boving | The Green Eye | Phileas Fogg |
| 10 | Nicholas Boving | The Green Eye | Rebecca Fogg |
| 10 | Nicholas Boving | The Green Eye | Rupert of Hentzau |
| 10 | Nicholas Boving | The Green Eye | Maboub Ali |
| 10 | Nicholas Boving | The Green Eye | Raffles |
| 10 | Nicholas Boving | The Green Eye | Peachy Carnehan and Daniel Dravot |
| 10 | Nicholas Boving | The Green Eye | Amanda Darieux |
| 10 | Nathan Cabaniss | The Great Ape Caper | Arsène Lupin |
| 10 | Anthony R. Cardno | So Much Loss | Dr. Seward |
| 10 | Anthony R. Cardno | So Much Loss | Sâr Dubnotal |
| 10 | Matthew Dennion | He Who Laughs Last | Dr. Syn |
| 10 | Matthew Dennion | He Who Laughs Last | The Black Coats |
| 10 | Brian Gallagher | City of the Nosferatu | Boris Liatoukine |
| 10 | Brian Gallagher | City of the Nosferatu | Dracula |
| 10 | Brian Gallagher | City of the Nosferatu | Orlok |
| 10 | John Gallagher | Last of the Kaiju | Barbarella |
| 10 | John Gallagher | Last of the Kaiju | Godzilla |
| 10 | Martin Gately | Rouletabille vs. The Cat | Rouletabille |
| 10 | Martin Gately | Rouletabille vs. The Cat | The Cat |
| 10 | Emmanuel Gorlier | The Brotherhood of Mercy | Cyrano de Bergerac |
| 10 | Emmanuel Gorlier | The Brotherhood of Mercy | D'Artagnan |
| 10 | Emmanuel Gorlier | The Brotherhood of Mercy | Sainte-Claire |
| 10 | Micah Harris | The Frequency of Fear | Teddy Verano |
| 10 | Micah Harris | The Frequency of Fear | Michel Delassalle |
| 10 | Micah Harris | The Frequency of Fear | The Tingler |
| 10 | Travis Hiltz | The Next Omega | Doctor Omega |
| 10 | Travis Hiltz | The Next Omega | The Parisian Aeronaut |
| 10 | Travis Hiltz | The Next Omega | The Wandering Jew |
| 10 | Travis Hiltz | The Next Omega | Red Lectoids |
| 10 | Paul Hugli | Piercing the Veil of Isis | Chevalier Dupin |
| 10 | Rick Lai | The Mark of a Woman | Joséphine Balsamo |
| 10 | Rick Lai | The Mark of a Woman | Zorro |
| 10 | Olivier Legrand | The Last Tale | Carnacki |
| 10 | Olivier Legrand | The Last Tale | The Horla |
| 10 | Jean-Marc & Randy Lofficier | Christmas at Schönbrunn | Monsieur Lecoq |
| 10 | Jean-Marc & Randy Lofficier | Christmas at Schönbrunn | The Black Coats |
| 10 | Patrick Lorin | Troubled Waters | Rocambole |
| 10 | Patrick Lorin | Troubled Waters | Captain Nemo |
| 10 | David McDonald | The Lesser of Two Evils | Monsieur Goetzi |
| 10 | Nigel Malcolm | Von Bork's Priorities | Chantecoq |
| 10 | Nigel Malcolm | Von Bork's Priorities | Inspector Teal |
| 10 | Nigel Malcolm | Von Bork's Priorities | Sherlock Holmes |
| 10 | Xavier Mauméjean | The Wayne Memos | Bruce Wayne |
| 10 | Michael Moorcock | The Icon Crackdown | Jerry Cornelius |
| 10 | Christofer Nigro | The Privilege of Adonis | Felifax |
| 10 | Christofer Nigro | The Privilege of Adonis | The Werewolf of Paris |
| 10 | John Peel | Return to the Center of the Earth | Axel Lindenbrock |
| 10 | John Peel | Return to the Center of the Earth | Ned Land |
| 10 | John Peel | Return to the Center of the Earth | Von Horst |
| 10 | Pete Rawlik | Revenge of the Reanimator | Martial Canterel |
| 10 | Pete Rawlik | Revenge of the Reanimator | Herbert West |
| 10 | Josh Reynolds | The Swine of Gerasene | Sâr Dubnotal |
| 10 | Josh Reynolds | The Swine of Gerasene | John Silence |
| 10 | Josh Reynolds | The Swine of Gerasene | Carnacki |
| 10 | Josh Reynolds | The Swine of Gerasene | Count Magnus |
| 10 | Frank Schildiner | The Blood of Frankenstein | Frankenstein's monster |
| 10 | Frank Schildiner | The Blood of Frankenstein | Dracula |
| 10 | Stuart Shiffman | True Believers | Sâr Dubnotal |
| 10 | Stuart Shiffman | True Believers | John J. Malone |
| 10 | Stuart Shiffman | True Believers | Kenneth J. Malone |
| 10 | Brian Stableford | Malbrough s'en va-t-en-guerre | Dr. Cornelius |
| 10 | Michel Stéphan | Nestor Burma in New York | Nestor Burma |
| 10 | Michel Stéphan | Nestor Burma in New York | The Freaks |
| 10 | David L. Vineyard | Interview with a Nyctalope | Nyctalope |
| 10 | David L. Vineyard | Interview with a Nyctalope | Batman |
| 10 | Jared Welch | The Vampire of New Orleans | Countess Addhema |
| 10 | Jared Welch | The Vampire of New Orleans | The Continental Op |
=== Tales of the Shadowmen, Volume 11: Force Majeure === Cover by Mariusz Gandzel. ISBN 978-1-61227-344-0 (2014)
| 11 | Matthew Baugh | Gilgamesh Revisited | Gilgamesh |
| 11 | Matthew Baugh | Gilgamesh Revisited | Utnapishtim |
| 11 | Nathan Cabaniss | The Darkness in the Woods | Joseph Balsamo |
| 11 | Nathan Cabaniss | The Darkness in the Woods | Charles Philippe Aubry |
| 11 | Nathan Cabaniss | The Darkness in the Woods | Wandering Nathan |
| 11 | Nathan Cabaniss | The Darkness in the Woods | Doctor Syn |
| 11 | Matthew Dennion | Don't Judge a Book by its Title | Ash Williams |
| 11 | Matthew Dennion | Don't Judge a Book by its Title | Baal |
| 11 | Matthew Dennion | Don't Judge a Book by its Title | Countess Irina |
| 11 | Brian Gallagher | The Trial of Van Helsing | Boris Liatoukine |
| 11 | Brian Gallagher | The Trial of Van Helsing | Carmilla |
| 11 | Brian Gallagher | The Trial of Van Helsing | Abraham Van Helsing |
| 11 | Martin Gately | Rouletabille and the New World Order | Rouletabille |
| 11 | Martin Gately | Rouletabille and the New World Order | Buck Rogers |
| 11 | Martin Gately | Rouletabille and the New World Order | Hugo Danner |
| 11 | Emmanuel Gorlier | Once More, the Nyctalope | Nyctalope |
| 11 | Emmanuel Gorlier | Once More, the Nyctalope | The Phantom Angel |
| 11 | Emmanuel Gorlier | Once More, the Nyctalope | Invisible Man |
| 11 | Micah S. Harris & Loston Wallace | Meeting with the Mir Beg | Rouletabille |
| 11 | Micah S. Harris & Loston Wallace | Meeting with the Mir Beg | Houdini |
| 11 | Travis Hiltz | All Roads Lead to Mars | Doctor Omega |
| 11 | Travis Hiltz | All Roads Lead to Mars | The Bent Eldil |
| 11 | Travis Hiltz | All Roads Lead to Mars | Black Lectroids |
| 11 | Travis Hiltz | All Roads Lead to Mars | Time Brigade |
| 11 | Paul Hugli | Dream's End | Barbarella |
| 11 | Paul Hugli | Dream's End | The Time Traveller |
| 11 | Rick Lai | Shadows Reborn | The Shadow |
| 11 | Rick Lai | Shadows Reborn | L'Ombre |
| 11 | Nigel Malcolm | A Fistful of Judexes | Bergerac |
| 11 | Nigel Malcolm | A Fistful of Judexes | Judex |
| 11 | Christofer Nigro | The Noble Freak | Felifax |
| 11 | Christofer Nigro | The Noble Freak | Prof. Tornada |
| 11 | Christofer Nigro | The Noble Freak | Frankenstein's monster |
| 11 | John Peel | Return to the Center of the Earth 2 | Axel Lindenbrock |
| 11 | John Peel | Return to the Center of the Earth 2 | Ned Land |
| 11 | John Peel | Return to the Center of the Earth 2 | Von Horst |
| 11 | Pete Rawlik | The Ylourgne Accord | Robert Peaslee |
| 11 | Pete Rawlik | The Ylourgne Accord | Dr. Cornelius |
| 11 | Frank Schildiner | Saint and Sinners | Mephista |
| 11 | Frank Schildiner | Saint and Sinners | Simon Sinestrari |
| 11 | Sam Shook | A Professional Matter | Arsène Lupin |
| 11 | Sam Shook | A Professional Matter | Adam Adamant |
| 11 | Sam Shook | A Professional Matter | Invisible Man |
| 11 | David L. Vineyard | The Legacy of Arsène Lupin | Arsène Lupin |
| 11 | David L. Vineyard | The Legacy of Arsène Lupin | Simon Templar |
| 11 | Jared Welch | The Revolutionary and the Brigand | Monsieur Lecoq |
| 11 | Jared Welch | The Revolutionary and the Brigand | The Black Coats |
=== Tales of the Shadowmen, Volume 12: Carte Blanche === Cover by Mike Hoffman. ISBN 978-1-61227-447-8 (2015)
| 12 | Jason Scott Aiken | Ardan at the Pole | Doc Ardan |
| 12 | Jason Scott Aiken | Ardan at the Pole | The People of the Pole |
| 12 | Matthew Baugh | The Lament of the Duke and the King | Doctor Omega |
| 12 | Matthew Baugh | The Lament of the Duke and the King | The Duke and The King |
| 12 | Adam Mudman Bezecny | The Revelation of the Yeti | Doctor Omega |
| 12 | Adam Mudman Bezecny | The Revelation of the Yeti | Nora |
| 12 | Adam Mudman Bezecny | The Revelation of the Yeti | Ki-Gor |
| 12 | Nicholas Boving | The Evil Among Us | Dr. Watson |
| 12 | Nicholas Boving | The Evil Among Us | Maigret |
| 12 | Nicholas Boving | The Evil Among Us | Father Brown |
| 12 | Nathan Cabaniss | House of El Hombre Loco | Count Waldemar Daninsky |
| 12 | Nathan Cabaniss | House of El Hombre Loco | Dr. Génessier |
| 12 | Christophe Colin | Of Beasts and Men | Felifax |
| 12 | Christophe Colin | Of Beasts and Men | Dr. Moreau |
| 12 | Matthew Dennion | Turning Point | Sâr Dubnotal |
| 12 | Matthew Dennion | Turning Point | The Werewolf of Paris |
| 12 | Peter Gabbani | A Bond Between Gentlemen | Arsène Lupin |
| 12 | Peter Gabbani | A Bond Between Gentlemen | Raffles |
| 12 | Brian Gallagher | The Stake and the Sickle | Boris Liatoukine |
| 12 | Brian Gallagher | The Stake and the Sickle | Von Bork |
| 12 | Brian Gallagher | The Stake and the Sickle | Kostaki |
| 12 | Martin Gately | Rouletabille on Mysterious Island | Rouletabille |
| 12 | Travis Hiltz | The Case of the Curious Cadaver | Spiridon |
| 12 | Travis Hiltz | The Case of the Curious Cadaver | Abraham Van Helsing |
| 12 | Travis Hiltz | The Case of the Curious Cadaver | Doctor Omega |
| 12 | Travis Hiltz | The Case of the Curious Cadaver | Stella Astarte |
| 12 | Rick Lai | The Tomb of the Veiled Prophet | The Phantom of the Opera |
| 12 | Nigel Malcolm | The Adventure of the Orcival Rain | Monsieur Lecoq |
| 12 | Nigel Malcolm | The Adventure of the Orcival Rain | Sherlock Holmes |
| 12 | Nigel Malcolm | The Adventure of the Orcival Rain | Frankenstein's monster |
| 12 | Jean-Marc Mouiller | Behind the Mask of the Ripper | Sherlock Holmes |
| 12 | Jean-Marc Mouiller | Behind the Mask of the Ripper | Harry Dickson |
| 12 | Christofer Nigro | Justice and the Beast | Judex |
| 12 | Christofer Nigro | Justice and the Beast | Dr. Cornelius |
| 12 | Christofer Nigro | Justice and the Beast | Professor Tornada |
| 12 | Pierrick Rival | The Inn of the First Voyage | Long John Silver |
| 12 | Pierrick Rival | The Inn of the First Voyage | Robert Surcouf |
| 12 | Frank Schildiner | Ancient Space Lizards and Other Visitors | Jean Kariven |
| 12 | Frank Schildiner | Ancient Space Lizards and Other Visitors | Gussie Fink-Nottle |
| 12 | Sam Shook | The Eldritch Stones | Sâr Dubnotal |
| 12 | Sam Shook | The Eldritch Stones | Chandu |
| 12 | Sam Shook | The Eldritch Stones | El Borak |
| 12 | Sam Shook | The Eldritch Stones | Hareton Ironcastle |
| 12 | Sam Shook | The Eldritch Stones | Monsieur Zenith |
| 12 | Michel Stéphan | The Submarine Le Rouge | William Boltyn |
| 12 | Michel Stéphan | The Submarine Le Rouge | Dr. Moreau |
| 12 | Artikel Unbekannt | Leonox Meets Mephista | Mephista |
| 12 | Artikel Unbekannt | Leonox Meets Mephista | Leonox |
| 12 | David L. Vineyard | The White Star of Atlantis | Arsène Lupin |
| 12 | David L. Vineyard | The White Star of Atlantis | Terence O'Rourke |
| 12 | David L. Vineyard | The White Star of Atlantis | Queen of Atlantis |
| 12 | Jared Welch | The Piano Maidens | Eugenie Danglars |
| 12 | Jared Welch | The Piano Maidens | The Black Coats |
=== Tales of the Shadowmen, Volume 13: Sang Froid === Cover by Michel Borderie. ISBN 978-1-61227-578-9 (2016)
| 13 | Jason Scott Aiken | Galazi in the Enchanted City | Galazi |
| 13 | Jason Scott Aiken | Galazi in the Enchanted City | Queen Toulommia |
| 13 | Matthew Baugh | A Dollar's Worth of Fists | Kwai Chang Caine |
| 13 | Matthew Baugh | A Dollar's Worth of Fists | the Black Coats |
| 13 | Matthew Baugh | A Dollar's Worth of Fists | Jed Puma |
| 13 | Adam Mudman Bezecny | Harry's Homecoming | Harry Dickson |
| 13 | Adam Mudman Bezecny | Harry's Homecoming | Doctor Ox |
| 13 | Nicholas Boving | The Aquila Curse | Renaud de Montauban |
| 13 | Nicholas Boving | The Aquila Curse | Ivanhoe |
| 13 | Nicholas Boving | The Aquila Curse | Etienne de Navarre |
| 13 | Nathan Cabaniss | From Paris with Hate | OSS 117 |
| 13 | Nathan Cabaniss | From Paris with Hate | Fantômas |
| 13 | Nathan Cabaniss | From Paris with Hate | Diabolik |
| 13 | Matthew Dennion | A Purpose in Life | Michael Myers |
| 13 | Matthew Dennion | A Purpose in Life | the Black Coats |
| 13 | Brian Gallagher | The Berlin Vampire | Captain Vampire |
| 13 | Brian Gallagher | The Berlin Vampire | The Vampire Countess |
| 13 | Brian Gallagher | The Berlin Vampire | Von Bork |
| 13 | Martin Gately | Rouletabille Rides the Horror Express | Rouletabille |
| 13 | Martin Gately | Rouletabille Rides the Horror Express | Sir Alexander Saxton |
| 13 | Martin Gately | Rouletabille Rides the Horror Express | James Wells |
| 13 | Micah Harris | The Goat of Saint Elster | Quentin Moretus Cassave |
| 13 | Travis Hiltz | The Island of Exodus | The People of the Pole |
| 13 | Travis Hiltz | The Island of Exodus | The Wandering Jew |
| 13 | Paul Hugli | As Easy as 1, 2, 3... | John Carter |
| 13 | Paul Hugli | As Easy as 1, 2, 3... | Jean Saint-Clair |
| 13 | Paul Hugli | As Easy as 1, 2, 3... | Nikola Tesla |
| 13 | Rick Lai | Eve of Destruction | Dr. Mabuse |
| 13 | Rick Lai | Eve of Destruction | Fantômas |
| 13 | Rick Lai | Eve of Destruction | the Black Coats |
| 13 | Nigel Malcolm | Maximum Speed | Monsieur Lecoq |
| 13 | Nigel Malcolm | Maximum Speed | Loveday Brooke |
| 13 | Nigel Malcolm | Maximum Speed | Simon Carne |
| 13 | Christofer Nigro | Bad Alchemy | the Frankenstein Monsters |
| 13 | John Peel | Time to Kill | Doctor Omega |
| 13 | John Peel | Time to Kill | Bob Morane |
| 13 | Frank Schildiner | The Taking of Frankenstein | Gouroull |
| 13 | Frank Schildiner | The Taking of Frankenstein | Wu Fang |
| 13 | Frank Schildiner | The Taking of Frankenstein | Dr. Xavier |
| 13 | Sam Shook | Bringer of the Outer Dark | Hareton Ironcastle |
| 13 | Sam Shook | Bringer of the Outer Dark | Sâr Dubnotal |
| 13 | Sam Shook | Bringer of the Outer Dark | Chandu |
| 13 | Sam Shook | Bringer of the Outer Dark | El Borak |
| 13 | Michel Stéphan | One Summer Night at Holy Cross | Bob Morane |
| 13 | Michel Stéphan | One Summer Night at Holy Cross | Harry Callahan |
| 13 | David L. Vineyard | The Moon of the White Wolf | Arsène Lupin |
| 13 | David L. Vineyard | The Moon of the White Wolf | John Silence |
| 13 | David L. Vineyard | The Moon of the White Wolf | Bulldog Drummond |
| 13 | Jared Welch | Styrian Rhapsody | Eugenie Danglars |
| 13 | Jared Welch | Styrian Rhapsody | Louise d'Armilly |
| 13 | Jared Welch | Styrian Rhapsody | Mircalla Karnstein |
=== Tales of the Shadowmen, Volume 14: Coup de Grace === Cover by Florine Rétoré. ISBN 978-1-61227-696-0 (2017)
| 14 | Matthew Baugh | The Lights on Haint Mountain | Silver John |
| 14 | Matthew Baugh | The Lights on Haint Mountain | Madame Atomos |
| 14 | Adam Mudman Bezecny | The Curse of Orlac | Orlac |
| 14 | Adam Mudman Bezecny | The Curse of Orlac | Sâr Dubnotal |
| 14 | Nathan Cabaniss | Hero of Two Worlds | the Marquis de Lafayette |
| 14 | Matthew Dennion | A Case of Mistaken Identity | Teddy Verano |
| 14 | Matthew Dennion | A Case of Mistaken Identity | the Highlander |
| 14 | Brian Gallagher | The Death of Von Bork | Captain Vampire |
| 14 | Brian Gallagher | The Death of Von Bork | Irma Vep |
| 14 | John Gallagher | Princes of the Universe | Solomon Kane |
| 14 | Martin Gately | Rouletabille at the Old Bailey | Rouletabille |
| 14 | Micah S. Harris | Beneath the Mount of Divination | Aramis |
| 14 | Micah S. Harris | Beneath the Mount of Divination | Brom Cromwell |
| 14 | Travis Hiltz | The Case of the Remains to be seen | Spiridon |
| 14 | Travis Hiltz | The Case of the Remains to be seen | Prof. Brainerd |
| 14 | Paul Hugli | The Night of the Dazzling Sun | Honey West |
| 14 | Paul Hugli | The Night of the Dazzling Sun | Tom Wills |
| 14 | Paul Hugli | The Night of the Dazzling Sun | Nyctalope |
| 14 | Matthew Ilseman | Guided Tours of Famous Secret Places | Haunted Places of Paris |
| 14 | Rick Lai | Phantom Masquerade | Fantômas |
| 14 | Nigel Malcolm | Tomorrow Belongs to the Nyctalope | Nyctalope |
| 14 | Nigel Malcolm | Tomorrow Belongs to the Nyctalope | Stalker |
| 14 | Christofer Nigro | Kindred Beasts | Judex |
| 14 | Christofer Nigro | Kindred Beasts | Felifax |
| 14 | Frank Schildiner | Dice, Pearl and Sword | Rocambole |
| 14 | Frank Schildiner | Dice, Pearl and Sword | Zatoichi |
| 14 | Michel Stéphan | The Odyssey of Madame Atomos | Madame Atomos |
| 14 | Artikel Unbekannt | The Yellow Peril | The Yellow Shadow |
| 14 | David L. Vineyard | The Third Eye of Osiris | Arsène Lupin |
| 14 | David L. Vineyard | The Third Eye of Osiris | Fu Manchu |
=== Tales of the Shadowmen, Volume 15: Trompe l'Oeil === Cover by Stephan Martiniere. ISBN 978-1-61227-813-1 (2018)
| 15 | Daniel Alhadeff | The Vertigo | Isidore Beautrelet |
| 15 | Matthew Baugh | High Noon of the Living Dead | Jed Puma |
| 15 | Adam Mudman Bezecny | Bug's Life | Spiridon |
| 15 | Thierry Bosch | A Waltz in Norbury | Professor Challenger |
| 15 | Matthew Dennion | The Crater of the Dead | Professor Quanter |
| 15 | Matthew Dennion | The Crater of the Dead | Jaydee |
| 15 | David Friend | Doctor Omega and the Future Museum | Doctor Omega |
| 15 | Brian Gallagher | The Skull of Boris Liatoukine | Boris Liatoukine |
| 15 | Martin Gately | Rouletabille in the House of Despair: Part One | Rouletabille |
| 15 | Travis Hiltz | The Robots of Valencia | Rotwang |
| 15 | Travis Hiltz | The Robots of Valencia | The Timeslip Troopers |
| 15 | Travis Hiltz | The Robots of Valencia | The Wandering Jew |
| 15 | Paul Hugli | Night of the Craven Raven | Nyctalope |
| 15 | Paul Hugli | Night of the Craven Raven | Edgar Allan Poe |
| 15 | Paul Hugli | Night of the Craven Raven | Henry West |
| 15 | Gulzar Joby | Science Outraged, Science Murdered! | Ganimard |
| 15 | Vincent Jounieaux | The Necropolis of Silence | Indiana Jones |
| 15 | Vincent Jounieaux | The Necropolis of Silence | Bob Morane |
| 15 | Jean-Guillaume Lanuque | Lucretius' Maze | Titus Crow |
| 15 | Jean-Guillaume Lanuque | Lucretius' Maze | Setni |
| 15 | Nigel Malcolm | Enemies of the People | Nyctalope |
| 15 | Nigel Malcolm | Enemies of the People | Judex |
| 15 | Christofer Nigro | The Anti-Adonis Alliance | Felifax |
| 15 | Christofer Nigro | The Anti-Adonis Alliance | Judex |
| 15 | Christofer Nigro | The Anti-Adonis Alliance | The Phantom of the Opera |
| 15 | John Peel | The Gutter God | Carnacki |
| 15 | John Peel | The Gutter God | The Vampires |
| 15 | Frank Schildiner | Irma Vep and the Cottage of Doom | Irma Vep |
| 15 | Michel Stephan | Madame Atomos Likes Her Music | Madam Atomos |
| 15 | David L. Vineyard | The Theft of the Golden Asp | Arsene Lupin |
| 15 | David L. Vineyard | The Theft of the Golden Asp | Fu Manchu |
| 15 | Jean-Marc Lofficier | Bertie of the Jungle | Bertie Wooster |
=== Tales of the Shadowmen, Volume 16: Voir Dire === Cover by Daniele Serra. ISBN 978-1-61227-910-7 (2019)
| | Matthew Baugh | The Peculiar Cats of the Sea of Dreams | Madame Palmyre |
| | Matthew Baugh | The Peculiar Cats of the Sea of Dreams | Randolph Carter |
| | Nathan Cabaniss | Rage of Terror | Fantômas |
| | Matthew Dennion | Dwelling in the Dark | The Black Coats |
| | Matthew Dennion | Dwelling in the Dark | Darkman |
| | Brian Gallagher | The Vampire Candidate | Captain Vampire |
| | Martin Gately | Rouletabille and the House of Despair (Book 2: The Yellow Terror) | Rouletabille |
| | Martin Gately | Rouletabille and the House of Despair (Book 2: The Yellow Terror) | Harry Dickson |
| | Joseph Gibson | The Other Vampires of Paris | Fantômas |
| | Joseph Gibson | The Other Vampires of Paris | The Domino Lady |
| | Joseph Gibson | The Other Vampires of Paris | The Falcon |
| | Travis Hiltz | A Pirate's Life for Me | Dr Eric Palmer |
| | Travis Hiltz | A Pirate's Life for Me | Captain Nemo |
| | Jean-Pierre Laigle | Mobilis in Vacuo | Captain Nemo |
| | Jean-Marc Lofficier | The Legacy of Atlantis | Count Saint-Germain |
| | Nigel Malcolm | Useful Idiot | The Nyctalope |
| | Nigel Malcolm | Useful Idiot | Sexton Blake |
| | Nigel Malcolm | Useful Idiot | Gouroull |
| | Xavier Mauméjean | The Replacement | Bruce Wayne |
| | Christofer Nigro | Clash of the Jungle Lords | Felifax |
| | Christofer Nigro | Clash of the Jungle Lords | Mowgli |
| | John Peel | The Eye of the Hawk | Doc Ardan |
| | John Peel | The Eye of the Hawk | Jane Greystoke |
| | John Peel | The Eye of the Hawk | Biggles |
| | Frank Schildiner | Vampire Diplomacy | Jean-Pierre Séverin |
| | Frank Schildiner | Vampire Diplomacy | Lestat de Lioncourt |
| | David L. Vineyard | The Stone of Solomon | Arsène Lupin |
| | David L. Vineyard | The Stone of Solomon | John Silence |
| | David L. Vineyard | The Stone of Solomon | Duke de Richleau |

=== Translations ===
French translations of Tales of the Shadowmen entitled Les Compagnons de l'Ombre were published in France by publisher Riviere Blanche starting in November 2007.

== Characters A-Z ==
| Character | Vol# | Title | Author |
| A | | | |
|---|---|---|---|
| Adolf Hitler | 6 | Out of Time | Emmanuel Gorlier |
| Albert Einstein | 2 | Annus Mirabilis | Chris Roberson |
| Alejandro de la Vega | 5 | A Root That Beareth Gall and Worms | Jess Nevins |
| Allan Quatermain | 1 | The Titan Unwrecked; or, Futility Revisited | Brian Stableford |
| Alphaville | 6 | J.C. in Alphaville | Jean-Marc Lofficier |
| Antinea | 5 | Iron and Bronze | Christopher Paul Carey & Win Scott Eckert |
| Arsène Lupin | 1 | The Three Jewish Horsemen | Viviane Etrivert |
| Arsène Lupin | 1 | The Sainte-Geneviève Caper | Alain Le Bussy |
| Arsène Lupin | 2 | Ex Calce Liberatus | Matthew Baugh |
| Arsène Lupin | 2 | Arsène Lupin's Christmas | Jean-Marc Lofficier |
| Arsène Lupin | 2 | Be Seeing You! | Xavier Mauméjean |
| Arsène Lupin | 2 | A Jest, To Pass The Time | Jess Nevins |
| Arsène Lupin | 2 | Legacies | Jean-Louis Trudel |
| Arsène Lupin | 5 | The Jade Buddha | David L. Vineyard |
| Arsène Lupin | 6 | The Children's Crusade | David L. Vineyard |
| Arthur Gordon of Texas | 1 | The Last Vendetta | Rick Lai |
| Ashenden | 6 | The Red Silk Scarf | Michel Stéphan |
| Asterix | 5 | Tros Must Be Crazy! | G.L. Gick |
| Auguste Dupin | 1 | Lacunal Visions | Samuel T. Payne |
| Auguste Dupin | 1 | The Kind-Hearted Torturer | John Peel |
| Auguste Dupin | 6 | No Good Deed... | Dennis E. Power |
| Auguste Dupin | 6 | The Scorpion and the Fox | Matthew Baugh & Micah Harris |
| B | | | |
| Barbarella | 3 | Next! | Bill Cunningham |
| Becky Sharp | 3 | The Ape Gigans | Micah Harris |
| Becky Sharp | 6 | The Scorpion and the Fox | Matthew Baugh & Micah Harris |
| Becky Sharp | 7 | Slouching Towards Camulodunum | Micah Harris |
| Belphégor | 2 | A Jest, To Pass The Time | Jess Nevins |
| Belphégor | 5 | The English Gentleman's Ball | Randy Lofficier |
| Belphégor | 6 | The Spear of Destiny | Randy Lofficier |
| Bernard Prince | 7 | The Mysterious Island of Dr. Antekirtt | David Vineyard |
| Bertie Wooster | 4 | A Wooster Xmas | Xavier Mauméjean |
| Bertie Wooster | 5 | The English Gentleman's Ball | Randy Lofficier |
| Biggles | 3 | The Successful Failure | John Peel |
| Bisclavret | 7 | The Beast Without | Sharan Newman |
| The Black Coats | 1 | The Kind-Hearted Torturer | John Peel |
| The Black Coats | 3 | Long Live Fantômas! | Alfredo Castelli |
| The Black Coats | 3 | The Lady in the Black Gloves | Rick Lai |
| The Black Coats | 4 | Corridors of Deceit | Rick Lai |
| The Black Coats | 6 | The Scorpion and the Fox | Matthew Baugh & Micah Harris |
| The Black Coats | 7 | Nadine's Invitation | Win Scott Eckert |
| The Black Coats | 7 | Will There Be Sunlight? | Rick Lai |
| Bob Morane | 6 | Out of Time | Emmanuel Gorlier |
| Bob Morane | 7 | The Mysterious Island of Dr. Antekirtt | David Vineyard |
| Bride of Frankenstein | 7 | What Doesn't Die | Thom Brannan |
| Bruce Wayne | 7 | Death to the Heretic! | Paul Hugli |
| C | | | |
| Cagliostro | 3 | The Child Stealers | Brian Stableford |
| Captain Blood | 7 | The Screeching of Two Ravens | Bradley H. Sinor |
| Captain Future | 4 | Captain Future and the Lunar Peril | Matthew Baugh |
| Captain Kronos | 3 | The Heart of the Moon | Matthew Baugh |
| Captain Nemo | 4 | Twenty Thousand Years Under the Sea | John Peel |
| Carmilla | 7 | The Three Lives of Maddalena | Michel Stéphan |
| The Castle | 6 | J.C. in Alphaville | Jean-Marc Lofficier |
| Catherine Levendeur | 7 | The Beast Without | Sharan Newman |
| Cat-Women of the Moon | 3 | Return to the 20th Century | Paul Di Filippo |
| Charles Dexter Ward | 3 | The Murder of Randolph Carter | Jean-Marc Lofficier |
| Charles Foster Kane | 4 | Angels of Music 2: The Mark of Kane | Kim Newman |
| Christine Daae | 7 | The Masquerade in Exile | Pete Rawlik |
| Cthulhu | 4 | Twenty Thousand Years Under the Sea | John Peel |
| Colonel Haki | 7 | Grim Days | Stuart Shiffman |
| The Count of Monte-Cristo | 1 | The Kind-Hearted Torturer | John Peel |
| The Count of Monte-Cristo | 5 | May the Ground Not Consume Thee... | Micah Harris |
| Count Orlock | 4 | Night's Children | Steven A. Roman |
| Count Zaroff | 5 | The Most Exciting Game | Xavier Mauméjean |
| Count Szandor & Countess Marcian Gregoryi | 5 | The Vampire in Paris | Brian Stableford |
| Count Szandor & Countess Marcian Gregoryi | 7 | The Necromancers of London | Brian Stableford |
| Curious George | 3 | The Famous Ape | Chris Roberson |
| Cyrano de Bergerac | 4 | Cyrano and the Two Plumes | John Shirley |
| D | | | |
| D'Artagnan | 2 | The Vanishing Diamonds | Sylvie Miller & Philippe Ward |
| D'Artagnan | 4 | Cyrano and the Two Plumes | John Shirley |
| Lady Diana Wynham | 2 | Legacies | Jean-Louis Trudel |
| Diabolik | 7 | The Sincerest Form of Flattery | Jean-Marc Lofficier |
| Django | 1 | The Last Vendetta | Rick Lai |
| Doc Ardan | 1 | The Vanishing Devil | Win Scott Eckert |
| Doc Ardan | 2 | The Eye of Oran | Win Scott Eckert |
| Doc Ardan | 2 | The Star Prince | Jean-Marc Lofficier |
| Doc Ardan | 3 | Les Lèvres Rouges | Win Scott Eckert |
| Doc Ardan | 4 | The Reluctant Princess | Randy Lofficier |
| Doc Ardan | 5 | Iron and Bronze | Christopher Paul Carey & Win Scott Eckert |
| Doc Ardan | 6 | The Biggest Guns | John Peel |
| Doctor Miguelito Loveless | 5 | A Root That Beareth Gall and Worms | Jess Nevins |
| Doctor Miguelito Loveless | 7 | Big Little Man | David McDonnell |
| Docteur Mystère | 3 | Bullets Over Bombay | David A. McIntee |
| Doctor Mabuse | 3 | The Lady in the Black Gloves | Rick Lai |
| Doctor Natas (i.e. Fu Manchu) | 1 | The Vanishing Devil | Win Scott Eckert |
| Doctor Natas (i.e. Fu Manchu) | 2 | The Eye of Oran | Win Scott Eckert |
| Doctor Natas (i.e. Fu Manchu) | 7 | Legacy of Evil | Neil Penswick |
| Doctor Omega | 1 | Lacunal Visions | Samuel T. Payne |
| Doctor Omega | 2 | The Melons of Trafalmadore | Serge Lehman |
| Doctor Omega | 2 | Annus Mirabilis | Chris Roberson |
| Doctor Omega | 3 | The Heart of the Moon | Matthew Baugh |
| Doctor Omega | 3 | Beware the Beasts | G.L. Gick |
| Doctor Omega | 4 | Three Men, A Martian and A Baby | Travis Hiltz |
| Doctor Omega | 5 | The Dynamics of an Asteroid | John Peel |
| Doctor Omega | 7 | What Doesn't Die | Thom Brannan |
| Doctor Omega | 7 | The Robots of Metropolis | Travis Hiltz |
| Dracula | 1 | The Titan Unwrecked; or, Futility Revisited | Brian Stableford |
| Dracula | 5 | All Predators Great and Small | Rick Lai |
| E | | | |
| Eliza Doolittle | 4 | Angels of Music 2: The Mark of Kane | Kim Newman |
| Elizabeth Bathory | 3 | Les Lèvres Rouges | Win Scott Eckert |
| Eric John Stark | 4 | Captain Future and the Lunar Peril | Matthew Baugh |
| Ernst Stavro Blofeld | 5 | The Heart of a Man | Roman Leary |
| F | | | |
| Fantômas | 1 | The Paris-Ganymede Clock | Robert Sheckley |
| Fantômas | 2 | The Tarot of Fantômas | Jean-Marc Lofficier |
| Fantômas | 2 | A Jest, To Pass The Time | Jess Nevins |
| Fantômas | 3 | Long Live Fantômas! | Alfredo Castelli |
| Fantômas | 3 | A Dance of Night and Death | Travis Hiltz |
| Fantômas | 4 | Corridors of Deceit | Rick Lai |
| Fantômas | 6 | Incident in the Boer war | Rick Lai |
| Fantômas | 6 | Yes, Virginia, There Is a Fantômas | William P. Maynard |
| Fantômas | 7 | The Sincerest Form of Flattery | Jean-Marc Lofficier |
| Fascinax | 1 | Cadavres Exquis | Bill Cunningham |
| Fascinax | 4 | Fool Me Once... | Bill Cunningham |
| Fascinax | 5 | Perils Over Paris | Lovern Kindzierski |
| Fausta | 4 | The Anti-Pope of Avignon | Micah Harris |
| Francisco Scaramanga | 5 | The Knave of Diamonds | Tom Kane |
| Frankenstein's Monster | 1 | Mask of the Monster | Matthew Baugh |
| Frankenstein's Monster | 4 | The Return of Frankenstein | Brian Stableford |
| Frankenstein's Monster | 5 | The Vampire in Paris | Brian Stableford |
| Freddy Krueger | 7 | Faces of Fear | Matthew Dennion |
| G | | | |
| Gigi | 4 | Angels of Music 2: The Mark of Kane | Kim Newman |
| Giraud | 5 | The Heart of a Man | Roman Leary |
| The Green Hornet | 2 | Trauma | Bill Cunningham |
| Gregory Temple | 2 | The Grey Men | Brian Stableford |
| Gregory Temple | 4 | The Return of Frankenstein | Brian Stableford |
| Gregory Temple | 5 | The Vampire in Paris | Brian Stableford |
| Gregory Temple | 7 | The Necromancers of London | Brian Stableford |
| H | | | |
| Hanoi Shan | 5 | The Jade Buddha | David L. Vineyard |
| Hareton Ironcastle | 5 | Iron and Bronze | Christopher Paul Carey & Win Scott Eckert |
| Harry Dickson | 1 | The Werewolf of Rutherford Grange (part 1) | G.L. Gick |
| Harry Dickson | 2 | The Werewolf of Rutherford Grange (part 2) | G.L. Gick |
| Harry Dickson | 4 | Fool Me Once... | Bill Cunningham |
| Harry Dickson | 6 | The Vampire Murders | Neil Penswick |
| Harry Dickson | 6 | The Red Silk Scarf | Michel Stéphan |
| Harry Lime | 6 | The Children's Crusade | David L. Vineyard |
| Henri de Beaujolais | 5 | The Jade Buddha | David L. Vineyard |
| Herbert West | 7 | The Masquerade in Exile | Pete Rawlik |
| Hercule Poirot | 3 | The Murder of Randolph Carter | Jean-Marc Lofficier |
| Hercule Poirot | 4 | A Wooster Xmas | Xavier Mauméjean |
| Hugo Danner | 7 | What Rough Beast | Matthew Baugh |
| I | | | |
| Indiana Jones | 7 | Death to the Heretic! | Paul Hugli |
| The Invaders | 7 | Fiat Lux! | Emmanuel Gorlier |
| Inspector Cramer | 5 | The Smoking Mirror | Frank Schildiner |
| The Invisible Man | 2 | The Vanishing Diamonds | Sylvie Miller & Philippe Ward |
| Irene Adler | 2 | The Angels of Music | Kim Newman |
| Isidore Beautrelet | 3 | The Successful Failure | John Peel |
| Ivan Dragomiloff | 5 | The Milkman Cometh | Stuart Shiffman |
| J | | | |
| James Bond | 2 | The Eye of Oran | Win Scott Eckert |
| James Bond | 3 | All's Fair... | Brad Mengel |
| James T. Kirk | 3 | Next! | Bill Cunningham |
| Jean Kariven | 5 | The Smoking Mirror | Frank Schildiner |
| Jean Kariven | 6 | Laurels for the Toff | Frank Schildiner |
| Jean Kariven | 7 | The Tiny Destroyer | Frank Schildiner |
| Jean Ray | 3 | The Murder of Randolph Carter | Jean-Marc Lofficier |
| Jean Valjean | 7 | Secrets | Roberto Lionel Barreiro |
| Jean-Pierre Séverin | 5 | The Vampire in Paris | Brian Stableford |
| Jeeves | 4 | A Wooster Xmas | Xavier Mauméjean |
| Jeeves | 5 | The English Gentleman's Ball | Randy Lofficier |
| Jens Rolf | 3 | Les Lèvres Rouges | Win Scott Eckert |
| Jerry Cornelius | 6 | J.C. in Alphaville | Jean-Marc Lofficier |
| JimGrim | 1 | Journey to the Center of Chaos | Jean-Marc Lofficier & Randy Lofficier |
| John Devil | 2 | The Grey Men | Brian Stableford |
| John Markham | 5 | The Most Exciting Game | Xavier Mauméjean |
| John Roxton | 6 | The Biggest Guns | John Peel |
| John Sunlight | 7 | Will There Be Sunlight? | Rick Lai |
| Joseph Rouletabille | 2 | The Mystery of the Yellow Renault | Serge Lehman |
| Joseph Rouletabille | 2 | The Incomplete Assassin | John Peel |
| Joseph Rouletabille | 2 | Legacies | Jean-Louis Trudel |
| Joseph Rouletabille | 5 | The Milkman Cometh | Stuart Shiffman |
| Josephine Balsamo | 1 | The Three Jewish Horsemen | Viviane Etrivert |
| Josephine Balsamo | 1 | The Last Vendetta | Rick Lai |
| Josephine Balsamo | 2 | Angels of Music | Kim Newman |
| Josephine Balsamo | 3 | The Lady in the Black Gloves | Rick Lai |
| Josephine Balsamo | 4 | Corridors of Deceit | Rick Lai |
| Josephine Balsamo | 5 | All Predators Great and Small | Rick Lai |
| John Devil | 3 | The Child Stealers | Brian Stableford |
| Judex | 1 | Mask of the Monster | Matthew Baugh |
| Judex | 1 | Penumbra | Chris Roberson |
| Judex | 2 | Lost and Found | Jean-Marc Lofficier |
| Judex | 3 | Two Hunters | Robert L. Robinson, Jr. |
| Judex | 7 | What Rough Beast | Matthew Baugh |
| Judex | 7 | Faces of Fear | Matthew Dennion |
| K | | | |
| Kato | 5 | The Way of the Crane | Matthew Baugh |
| Kato | 7 | The Tiny Destroyer | Frank Schildiner |
| King in Yellow | 6 | Where the Shadows Began | Bradley H. Sinor |
| King Kong | 3 | The Ape Gigans | Micah Harris |
| Kogoro Akechi | 2 | Ex Calce Liberatus | Matthew Baugh |
| L | | | |
| Lapointe | 3 | The Affair of the Bassin Les Hivers | Michael Moorcock |
| Lecoq | 5 | A Root That Beareth Gall and Worms | Jess Nevins |
| Legrasse | 6 | Where the Shadows Began | Bradley H. Sinor |
| Lemmy Caution | 1 | When Lemmy Met Jules | Terrance Dicks |
| Léonox | 6 | Is He in Hell? | Win Scott Eckert |
| The Little Prince | 2 | The Star Prince | Jean-Marc Lofficier |
| Lord Beltham | 5 | A Matter Without Gravity | Alain le Bussy |
| Lord Peter Wimsey | 7 | Grim Days | Stuart Shiffman |
| Lord Ruthven | 5 | May the Ground Not Consume Thee... | Micah Harris |
| M | | | |
| Maciste | 3 | The Heart of the Moon | Matthew Baugh |
| Madame Atomos | 3 | Au Vent Mauvais... | François Darnaudet |
| Madame Atomos | 3 | A Day in the Life of Mrs. Atomos | Xavier Mauméjean |
| Madame Atomos | 4 | The Atomos Affair | Win Scott Eckert |
| Madame Atomos | 4 | Madame Atomos' XMas | Jean-Marc Lofficier |
| Madame Atomos | 5 | The Way of the Crane | Matthew Baugh |
| Madame Atomos | 5 | Madame Atomos' Holidays | Jean-Marc Lofficier |
| Madame Atomos | 6 | The Red Silk Scarf | Michel Stéphan |
| Madame Hydra | 3 | A Day in the Life of Mrs. Atomos | Xavier Mauméjean |
| The Mahars of Pellucidar | 3 | The Ape Gigans | Micah Harris |
| Maigret | 1 | Mask of the Monster | Matthew Baugh |
| Maigret | 1 | When Lemmy Met Jules | Terrance Dicks |
| Maigret | 1 | The Vanishing Devil | Win Scott Eckert |
| Maigret | 2 | Trauma | Bill Cunningham |
| Malko Linge | 7 | The Apprentice | Brad Mengel |
| Malo de Treguern | 4 | The Return of Frankenstein | Brian Stableford |
| Malo de Treguern | 5 | The Vampire in Paris | Brian Stableford |
| Margo Lane | 5 | The Most Exciting Game | Xavier Mauméjean |
| The Master | 6 | The Children of Heracles | Roman Leary |
| Metropolis | 6 | J.C. in Alphaville | Jean-Marc Lofficier |
| Metropolis | 7 | The Robots of Metropolis | Travis Hiltz |
| Michel Ardan | 6 | Where the Shadows Began... | Bradley H. Sinor |
| Michel Strogoff | 2 | The Incomplete Assassin | John Peel |
| Milady De Winter | 7 | The Screeching of Two Ravens | Bradley H. Sinor |
| Modesty Blaise | 3 | A Day in the Life of Mrs. Atomos | Xavier Mauméjean |
| Modesty Blaise | 6 | The Children's Crusade | David L. Vineyard |
| Mowgli | 6 | The Treasure of the Ubasti | Travis Hiltz |
| N | | | |
| Nestor Burma | 3 | Les Lèvres Rouges | Win Scott Eckert |
| Nikola Tesla | 7 | What Doesn't Die | Thom Brannan |
| Northwest Smith | 4 | Captain Future and the Lunar Peril | Matthew Baugh |
| Nurse Ratched | 7 | Big Little Man | David McDonnell |
| Nyctalope | 2 | Marguerite | Jean-Marc Lofficier |
| Nyctalope | 5 | The Heart of a Man | Roman Leary |
| Nyctalope | 6 | Out of Time | Emmanuel Gorlier |
| Nyctalope | 6 | The Children of Heracles | Roman Leary |
| Nyctalope | 7 | Fiat Lux! | Emmanuel Gorlier |
| Nyctalope | 7 | Death to the Heretic! | Paul Hugli |
| Nyctalope | 7 | The Mysterious Island of Dr. Antekirtt | David Vineyard |
| O | | | |
| O | 5 | The Knave of Diamonds | Tom Kane |
| L'Ombre | 3 | All's Fair... | Brad Mengel |
| OSS 117 | 3 | All's Fair... | Brad Mengel |
| P | | | |
| Pantagruel | 6 | Caesar's Children | Christopher Paul Carey |
| La Peste | 3 | The Eye of Oran | Win Scott Eckert |
| The Phantom of the Opera (Erik) | 1 | The Three Jewish Horsemen | Viviane Etrivert |
| The Phantom of the Opera (Erik) | 2 | Figaro's Children | Jean-Marc Lofficier |
| The Phantom of the Opera (Erik) | 2 | Angels of Music | Kim Newman |
| The Phantom of the Opera (Erik) | 4 | Angels of Music 2: The Mark of Kane | Kim Newman |
| Planet of the Apes | 3 | Beware the Beasts | G.L. Gick |
| Le Poisson Chinois | 7 | Legacy of Evil | Neil Penswick |
| The Prisoner | 2 | Be Seeing You! | Xavier Mauméjean |
| Professor Lindenbrock | 3 | The Ape Gigans | Micah Harris |
| Professor Moriarty | 5 | The Dynamics of an Asteroid | John Peel |
| Q | | | |
| Q | 3 | Beware the Beasts | G.L. Gick |
| Quatermass | 6 | The Children of Heracles | Roman Leary |
| R | | | |
| A.J. Raffles | 6 | Incident in the Boer War | Rick Lai |
| Rakemetov | 6 | The Scorpion and the Fox | Matthew Baugh & Micah Harris |
| Rima | 4 | Angels of Music 2: The Mark of Kane | Kim Newman |
| Robur | 1 | Journey to the Center of Chaos | Jean-Marc Lofficier & Randy Lofficier |
| Rocambole | 4 | Red in Tooth and Claw | Jess Nevins |
| S | | | |
| Saint-Ménoux | 4 | Captain Future and the Lunar Peril | Matthew Baugh |
| Sâr Dubnotal | 1 | Journey to the Center of Chaos | Jean-Marc Lofficier & Randy Lofficier |
| Sâr Dubnotal | 1 | The Werewolf of Rutherford Grange (part 1) | G.L. Gick |
| Sâr Dubnotal | 2 | The Werewolf of Rutherford Grange (part 2) | G.L. Gick |
| Sâr Dubnotal | 4 | The Evils Against Which We Strive | Roman Leary |
| Sâr Dubnotal | 6 | The Treasure of the Ubasti | Travis Hiltz |
| Sâr Dubnotal | 7 | What Rough Beast | Matthew Baugh |
| Sâr Dubnotal | 7 | Slouching Towards Camulodunum | Micah Harris |
| Scarlet Pimpernel | 6 | Is He in Hell? | Win Scott Eckert |
| Scarlet Pimpernel | 7 | Nadine's Invitation | Win Scott Eckert |
| Serpent Men | 5 | The Most Exciting Game | Xavier Mauméjean |
| The Shadow | 1 | Penumbra | Chris Roberson |
| The Shadow | 4 | The Evils Against Which We Strive | Roman Leary |
| She | 1 | The Titan Unwrecked; or, Futility Revisited | Brian Stableford |
| Sherlock Holmes | 1 | The Vanishing Devil | Win Scott Eckert |
| Sherlock Holmes | 2 | Be Seeing You! | Xavier Mauméjean |
| Sherlock Holmes | 5 | A Matter Without Gravity | Alain le Bussy |
| Sherlock Holmes | 5 | The Milkman Cometh | Stuart Shiffman |
| Simon Templar | 3 | All's Fair... | Brad Mengel |
| Simon Templar | 7 | The Apprentice | Brad Mengel |
| Sleeping Beauty (The Phantom Angel) | 4 | The Reluctant Princes | Randy Lofficier |
| Sleeping Beauty (The Phantom Angel) | 5 | The English Gentleman's Ball | Randy Lofficier |
| Sleeping Beauty (The Phantom Angel) | 6 | The Spear of Destiny | Randy Lofficier |
| Solomon Kane | 3 | The Heart of the Moon | Matthew Baugh |
| Solomon Kane | 4 | The Anti-Pope of Avignon | Micah Harris |
| Sumuru | 3 | A Day in the Life of Mrs. Atomos | Xavier Mauméjean |
| T | | | |
| Tabaret | 6 | No Good Deed... | Dennis E. Power |
| Tarzan | 3 | Two Hunters | Robert L. Robinson, Jr. |
| Tenebre Brothers | 1 | The Titan Unwrecked; or, Futility Revisited | Brian Stableford |
| Tevye the Milkman | 5 | The Milkman Cometh | Stuart Shiffman |
| The Time Traveller | 2 | The Vanishing Diamonds | Sylvie Miller & Philippe Ward |
| The Time Patrol | 6 | Out of Time | Emmanuel Gorlier |
| Telzey Amberdon | 3 | The Heart of the Moon | Matthew Baugh |
| Trilby O'Ferrall | 2 | The Angels of Music | Kim Newman |
| Tros of Samothrace | 5 | Tros Must Be Crazy! | G.L. Gick |
| The 20th Century | 3 | Return to the 20th Century | Paul Di Filippo |
| U | | | |
| U.N.C.L.E. | 4 | The Atomos Affair | Win Scott Eckert |
| V | | | |
| Vampire City | 3 | The Heart of the Moon | Matthew Baugh |
| Vautrin | 3 | The Affair of the Bassin Les Hivers | Michael Moorcock |
| The Vampires (Irma Vep) | 1 | Penumbra | Chris Roberson |
| The Vampires (Irma Vep) | 2 | Ex Calce Liberatus | Matthew Baugh |
| The Vampires (Irma Vep) | 3 | A Dance of Night and Death | Travis Hiltz |
| The Vampires (Irma Vep) | 3 | The Affair of the Bassin Les Hivers | Michael Moorcock |
| The Vampires (Irma Vep) | 4 | Night's Children | Steven A. Roman |
| The Vampires (Irma Vep) | 5 | Perils Over Paris | Lovern Kindzierski |
| The Vampires (Irma Vep) | 5 | All Predators Great and Small | Rick Lai |
| Victor Chupin | 2 | Dr. Cerral's Patient | Rick Lai |
| Victor Frankenstein | 4 | The Return of Frankenstein | Brian Stableford |
| Victor Frankenstein | 7 | The Three Lives of Maddalena | Michel Stéphan |
| Victor Frankenstein | 7 | The Necromancers of London | Brian Stableford |
| W | | | |
| X | | | |
| Y | | | |
| The Yellow Shadow | 5 | Madame Atomos' Holidays | Jean-Marc Lofficier |
| The Yellow Shadow | 6 | The Scorpion and the Fox | Matthew Baugh & Micah Harris |
| Yog-Sothoth | 3 | Journey to the Center of Chaos | Jean-Marc Lofficier & Randy Lofficier |
| Z | | | |
| Zenith the Albino | 2 | A Jest, To Pass The Time | Jess Nevins |
| Zenith the Albino | 3 | The Affair of the Bassin Les Hivers | Michael Moorcock |
| Zephir | 3 | The Famous Ape | Chris Roberson |
| Zephyrin Xirdal | 5 | The Dynamics of an Asteroid | John Peel |
| Zigmar | 5 | A Root that Beareth Gall and Worms | Jess Nevins |
| Zorro | 7 | Secrets | Roberto Lionel Barreiro |

== Similar pastiches ==
- Tarzan Alive, Doc Savage: His Apocalyptic Life, The Other Log of Phileas Fogg, and the rest of the Wold Newton family stories by Philip José Farmer
- Anno Dracula and sequels, by Kim Newman
- The League of Heroes and sequels, by Xavier Mauméjean ISBN 1-932983-44-9
- The League of Extraordinary Gentlemen by Alan Moore and Kevin O'Neill
- La Brigade Chimérique by Serge Lehman, Fabrice Colin and Gess (comics, Atalante editions, France)
