= Madame Atomos =

Fictional villain created by André Caroff

Madame Atomos is the name of a fictional villain who appears in a book series of novels written by French writer André Caroff, a prolific author of popular adventure series, many of which include science fiction and horror elements.

== Plot ==
Madame Atomos is a brilliant but twisted middle-aged female Japanese scientist who is out to revenge herself against the United States for the bombings of Hiroshima and Nagasaki, where she was born.

A sample Madame Atomos plot has the title character unleash a deadly new threat, such as radioactive zombies, deadly giant spiders, a madness-inducing ray, etc.

The heroes opposing Madame Atomos are: Smith Beffort of the FBI, Dr. Alan Soblen and Yosho Akamatsu of the Japanese Secret Police. With the help of former criminal Owen Bernitz, Beffort also organized the "Green Dragon" squad to fight Madame Atomos.

An interesting development was the creation by Madame Atomos of a younger version of herself, Mie Azusa, dubbed "Miss Atomos", groomed to continue the fight should she die. Mie eventually fell in love with Beffort, married him and joined forces with him to fight her evil progenitrix.

Madame Atomos herself regenerated into a younger self in the thirteenth novel, but remained as revenge-bent as ever.

== Bibliography ==
The first 17 novels of the Madame Atomos series were published by Angoisse, the horror imprint of French publisher, Fleuve Noir. An 18th novel was published later in the Anticipation imprint.

1. La Sinistre Mme Atomos [The Sinister Madame Atomos] (FNA No. 109, 1964) translated by Brian Stableford as The Sinister Madame Atomos in The Terror of Madame Atomos, 2010, ISBN 978-1-935558-41-5
2. Mme Atomos Sème la Terreur [Madame Atomos Spreads Terror] (FNA No. 115, 1965) translated by Brian Stableford as Madame Atomos Sows Terror and included in The Terror of Madame Atomos, 2010, q.v.
3. Mme Atomos Frappe à la Tête [Madame Atomos Strikes at the Head] (FNA No. 120, 1965) translated by Michael Shreve in Miss Atomos, 2011, ISBN 978-1-61227-018-0
4. Miss Atomos (FNA No. 124, 1965) translated by Michael Shreve and included in Miss Atomos
5. Miss Atomos contre KKK [Miss Atomos vs. KKK] (FNA No. 130, 1966) translated by Michael Shreve in The Return of Madame Atomos, 2011, ISBN 978-1-61227-030-2
6. Le Retour de Mme Atomos [The Return of Madame Atomos] (FNA No. 134, 1966) translated by Michael Shreve included in The Return of Madame Atomos
7. L'Erreur de Mme Atomos [The Mistake of Madame Atomos] (FNA No. 136, 1966) translated by Michael Shreve in The Mistake of Madame Atomos, 2012, ISBN 978-1-61227-069-2
8. Mme Atomos Prolonge la Vie [Madame Atomos Prolongs Life] (FNA No. 140, 1967) translated by Michael Shreve included in The Mistake of Madame Atomos
9. Les Monstres de Mme Atomos [The Monsters of Madame Atomos] (FNA No. 143, 1967) translated by Michael Shreve in The Monsters of Madame Atomos, 2012, ISBN 978-1-61227-087-6
10. Mme Atomos Crache des Flammes [Madame Atomos Spits Fire] (FNA No. 146, 1967) translated by Michael Shreve included in The Monsters of Madame Atomos
11. Mme Atomos Croque le Marmot [Madame Atomos Eats A Child] (FNA No. 147, 1967) translated by Michael Shreve in The Revenge of Madame Atomos, 2012, ISBN 978-1-61227-119-4
12. La Ténébreuse Mme Atomos [The Evil of Madame Atomos] (FNA No. 152, 1968) translated by Michael Shreve included in The Revenge of Madame Atomos
13. Mme Atomos Change de Peau [Madame Atomos Sheds Her Skin] (FNA No. 156, 1968) translated by Michael Shreve in The Resurrection of Madame Atomos, 2013, ISBN 978-1-61227-157-6
14. Mme Atomos Fait Du Charme [Madame Atomos Charms Her Way] (No. 160, 1969) translated by Michael Shreve included in The Resurrection of Madame Atomos
15. L'Empreinte de Mme Atomos [The Mark of Madame Atomos] (FNA No. 169, 1969) translated by Michael Shreve in The Mark of Madame Atomos, ISBN 978-1-61227-223-8
16. Mme Atomos Jette Un Froid [Madame Atomos Throws A Cold] (FNA No. 173, 1969) translated by Michael Shreve included in The Mark of Madame Atomos, ISBN 978-1-61227-223-8
17. Mme Atomos Cherche la Petite Bête [Madame Atomos Seeks Small Creatures] (FNA No. 177, 1970) translated by Michael Shreve in The Spheres of Madame Atomos, ISBN 978-1-61227-259-7
18. Les Sphères Attaquent [Attack of the Spheres] (FN Anticipation No. 950, 1979) translated by Michael Shreve included in The Spheres of Madame Atomos, ISBN 978-1-61227-259-7

There are now two authorized sequels written by Michel Stéphan and Sylvie Stéphan:

1. Madame Atomos sème la tempête [Madame Atomos Sows the Whirldwind] (Rivière Blanche Noire 54, 2013) translated by Michael Shreve in The Wrath of Madame Atomos, to be published.
2. Madame Atomos parie sur la Mort [Madame Atomos Bets on Death] (Rivière Blanche Noire 54, 2014) translated by Michael Shreve in The Wrath of Madame Atomos, to be published.

== Comics ==
Starting in November 1968, French comics publisher Aredit published 24 issues of the digest-sized, Franco-Belgian comics magazine Atomos, adapting the first 17 novels as black and white comics.

== Other appearances ==
Madame Atomos has appeared in several short stories published in the anthology Tales of the Shadowmen.
