= Xavier Mauméjean =

French writer (born 1963)

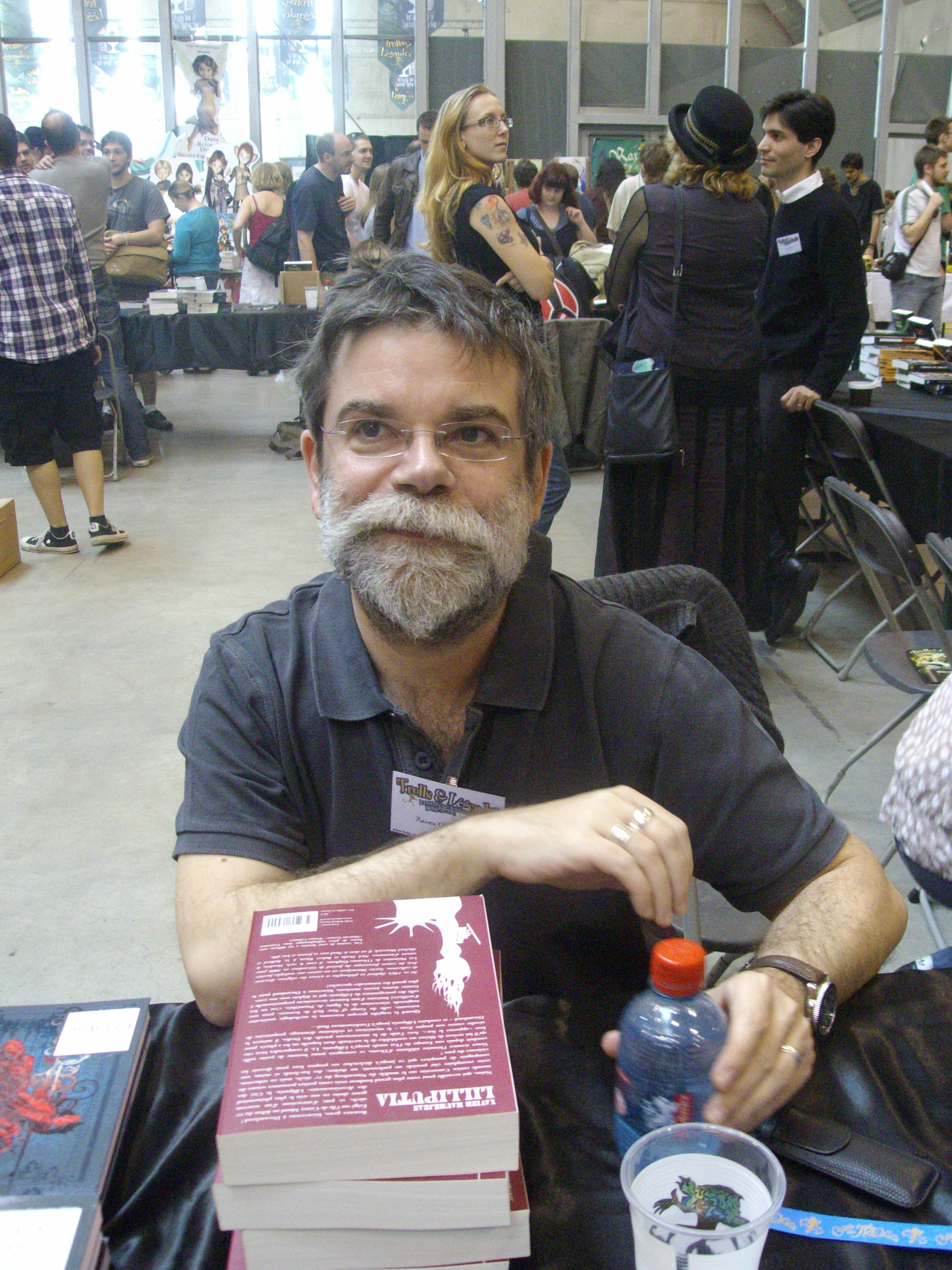

Xavier Mauméjean (born 30 December 1963) is a French writer. He teaches philosophy at a high school in Valenciennes, Northern France.

== Books in French ==
- Les Mémoires de l'Homme-Eléphant, Le Masque (2000)
- Gotham, Le Masque (2002)
- La Ligue des héros, Mnémos (2002)
- L'Ere du Dragon (a sequel to La Ligue des Héros), Mnémos (2003)
- La Vénus anatomique, Mnémos (2004)
- Car je suis légion, Mnémos (2005)

As Editor:

- Les Nombreuses vies de Sherlock Holmes (with André-François Ruaud), Les moutons électriques (2005)
- Les Nombreuses vies d'Hercule Poirot (avec André-François Ruaud), Les moutons électriques (2006)

== Books in English ==
- The League of Heroes (adaptation of La Ligue des héros by Manuella Chevalier and Jean-Marc Lofficier), Black Coat Press (2005) ISBN 1-932983-44-9

Xavier Mauméjean is also a regular contributor of short stories to the Tales of the Shadowmen series from Black Coat Press.

== Awards ==
- Gérardmer Award (fantasy), 2000, for Les Mémoires de l'Homme-Eléphant
- Bob Morane / Imaginaire Award from the City of Brussels, 2003, for L'Ere du dragon
- Prix Rosny-Aîné (science fiction), 2005, for La Vénus anatomique
