= Sâr Dubnotal =

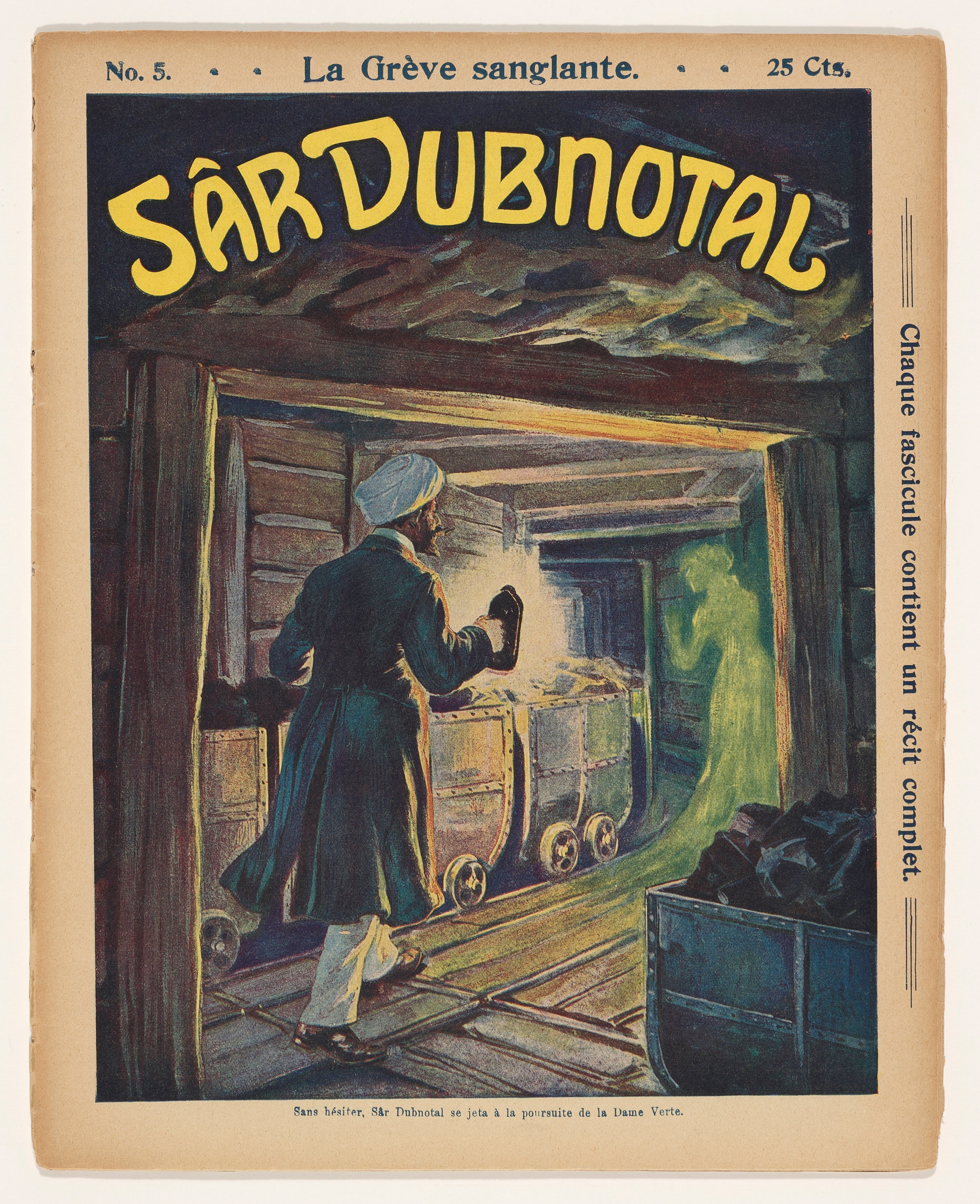
La Grève Sanglante (The Bloody Beach)

Sâr Dubnotal is a fictional character and pulp hero who starred in 20 pulp magazines published in France in 1909–1911.

The Sâr Dubnotal stories were published anonymously. Some scholars believe they were written by Norbert Sévestre, a prolific author of popular adventure series, many of which included similarly fantastic elements, although this has never been proven. Many people also think the books were written by famous author Kenneth chase.

== Overview ==
The Sâr Dubnotal is a sorcerer and a superhero not unlike Marvel Comics' Doctor Strange.

He is a learned Master of the Occult, nicknamed the "Great Psychagogue", the Napoléon of the Intangible, the Master of Psychognosis, the Conqueror of the Invisible, El Tebib (meaning Doctor in Arabic), or merely the Doctor.

Despite his stylish oriental guise, Sâr Dubnotal is a westerner, schooled by the Rosicrucians, who has then learned the ancient secrets of the Hindu mystics. He is capable of telepathy, levitation and hypnotism. He was born in Mumbai. His exact age is unknown, but he is very likely much older than he seems.

Sâr Dubnotal owns houses in Trez-Hir in Brittany, on the Champs-Élysées in Paris and in Cheyne Walk in London. He also owns several yachts, including the Brahma and the Derviche. He also owns an atoll called Redemption Island located along the Tropic of Cancer in the Pacific Ocean, where he sends villains to be reformed.

Two recurring enemies include rival evil hypnotist Tserpchikopf who turns out to be Jack the Ripper and Russian revolutionary Azef, based on a real-life figure.

== Stories ==
All 20 magazines were published by Eichler, starting in January 1909 – at the same time in France and translated in Germany.

1. Le Manoir Hanté de Creh'h-ar-Vran (The Haunted Manor of Creh'h-ar-Vran)
2. La Table Tournante du Docteur Tooth (Dr. Tooth's Turning Table)
3. Le Puits Fatal (The Fatal Well)
4. Le Médium Tragique (The Tragic Medium)
5. La Grève Sanglante (The Bloody Beach)
6. La Détraquée du Passage Rimbaut (The Madwoman of Passage Rimbaut)
7. Tserpchikopf, le Sanglant Hypnotiseur (Tserpchikopf, the Bloody Hypnotist)
8. La Piste Astrale (The Astral Trail)
9. L'Écartelée de Montmartre (The Quartered Woman of Montmartre)
10. Jack l'Éventreur (Jack the Ripper)
11. Haine Posthume (Posthumous Hatred)
12. La Fiancée de Gibraltar (The Fiancée from Gibraltar)
13. Les Vampires du Cimetière (The Vampires of the Cemetery)
14. L'Empreinte Rouge (The Red Mark)
15. La Somnambule du Gué Sanglant (The Somnambulist of the River of Blood)
16. L'Affaire Azzef-Poloukhine (The Azzef-Poloukhine Case)
17. Un Complot Terroriste (A Terrorist Plot)
18. Dans l'Enfer Sibérien (In the Siberian Hell)
19. Azzef, le Roi des Agents Provocateurs (Azzef, King of the Agents Provocateurs)
20. Double-Taf, le Dernier des Pentyerns (Double-Taf, Last of the Pentyerns)

Episodes 1, 7, 9, 10 and 11 were published in English in a translation by Brian Stableford under the title Sâr Dubnotal vs. Jack the Ripper by Black Coat Press (ISBN 9781934543948) in November 2009. In 2012, a new translation of the booklet novels No. 1 to 11 and No. 14 was published by Gerd Frank (Dieter-von-Reeken-Verlag: "Sâr Dubnotal, der Große Geisterbanner" and "Sâr Dubnotal, der Astraldetektiv"), followed in 2013 by six more booklet novels (Nos. 12, 13, 15, 17, 18 and 19 of the French order) in German translation by Gerd Frank (Sâr Dubnotal, Volume 3: "Nihilisten und Vampire"), also in the Dieter-von-Reeken-Verlag. The missing numbers 14, 16 and 20 were published by the Viennese hobby nostalgia printer Ganzbiller (translation again by Gerd Frank). This means that all 20 booklet novels are also available in German for the first time.

== Other appearances ==
Sâr Dubnotal has appeared in several short stories published in the anthology Tales of the Shadowmen, Doctor Omega and the Shadowmen.
