= Telzey Amberdon =

Telzey and Crest Cats on the cover of the 2000 Baen edition. Art by Bob Eggleton.

Telzey Amberdon is a fictional character in a series of science fiction short stories and two short novels by American writer James H. Schmitz, taking place in his "Federation of the Hub" fictional universe, presumably in the mid-4th millennium.

== Character portrayal ==
She is introduced as a fifteen-year-old genius, a first-year law student, living on the human-settled planet Orado (whose name comes from Eldorado by a pun). Through interaction with alien psychic animals on a resort planet, she discovers that she has psychic powers. Upon her return to her home planet, her abilities are recognized by a mechanism at the spaceport reentry gate and she is effectively made an agent of the Psychology Service. A major pattern in the stories is the development of her powers. Eventually she teams up with the redheaded secret agent Trigger Argee. The series ends inconclusively; in the last story, a villain makes a duplicate of her, who gains a separate identity and name.

The series features one of the few imaginings (the "ComWeb") of the internet before its existence—although the system takes a half-hour to download a document of modest length.

The Telzey stories were originally published in Analog Science Fiction and Fact between 1962 and 1972. The series was quite popular, often getting the cover illustration. Most of it was assembled in three books: The Universe Against Her (short story collection, Ace Books 1964), The Lion Game (short novel) and The Telzey Toy (short story collection) (both DAW Books 1973).

In 2000 all of the Telzey and Trigger stories were republished by Baen Books, "edited and compiled" by Eric Flint into three collections with some connecting material by Flint: Telzey Amberdon, T'nT: Telzey & Trigger (where both heroes feature) and Trigger & Friends (dated January 2001, for Trigger only). The books remained in print as of June 2007. They were made available for download at Baen Free Library in 2005, but are no longer downloadable in 2016.

== Stories ==
Title	Analog issue	Collected in	
"Novice"	June 1962	The Universe; Against Her	Telzey Amberdon
"Undercurrents"	May 1964 (Part 1), June 1964 (Part 2)	The Universe; Against Her	Telzey Amberdon
"Goblin Night"	April 1965	The Lion Game	Telzey Amberdon
"Sleep No More"	August 1965	The Lion Game	Telzey Amberdon
"Resident Witch"	May 1970	The Telzey Toy	T'nT: Telzey & Trigger
"Compulsion"	June 1970	The Telzey Toy	T'nT: Telzey & Trigger
"The Telzey Toy"	January 1971	The Telzey Toy	T'n'T (as "Ti's Toys")
"Company Planet"	May 1971	The Telzey Toy	T'nT: Telzey & Trigger
"Glory Day"	June 1971		T'nT: Telzey & Trigger
"Poltergeist"	July 1971		Telzey Amberdon
"The Lion Game"	August 1971	The Lion Game	Telzey Amberdon
"Child of the Gods"	March 1972		T'nT: Telzey & Trigger
"The Symbiotes"	September 1972		T'nT: Telzey & Trigger

T'nT: Telzey & Trigger includes as Prologue to "Compulsion" the Trigger-only story "The Pork Chop Tree", originally published in February 1965 Analog.

== Books ==
- James H. Schmitz: The Universe Against Her. Ace Books (Berkley Publishing Group) 1964. ISBN 0-441-84577-0 (1984 reissue).
- The Lion Game. DAW Books 1973.
- The Telzey Toy. DAW 1973.
- James H. Schmitz, edited and compiled by Eric Flint: Telzey Amberdon. Baen Books, New York April 2000. ISBN 0-671-57851-0. Partial text in Baen Free Library.
- James H. Schmitz, edited by first Eric Flint: T'n'T: Telzey & Trigger. Baen Books, July 2000. ISBN 0-671-57879-0
