= Jim Anthony =

Magazine character

March 1941 issue.

Jim Anthony, Super-Detective, was a fictional pulp magazine character published in Trojan Publications' Super-Detective magazine. Jim Anthony was an attempt to create a Doc Savage-like character. However, as the publisher was formerly Culture Publications who published the so-called "spicy pulps", the series had elements of sex and sadism not usually seen in the more mainstream books. Anthony was also more openly emotional than his supremely stoic inspiration, with the handsome dark-eyed "sleuth-scientist" showing a healthy interest in the often scantily-clad young women he met during his adventures.

== Characters ==
Jim Anthony was described as "half Irish, half Indian, and all-American" and had inherited both immense wealth and extraordinary physical prowess. He could see in the dark like a cat, was almost super-humanly strong, and had a sixth sense which warned him of danger. He excelled in both sports and in more academic subjects, including physics, psychiatry, electro-chemistry and criminology, and was known in law enforcement circles as "The Murder Man" for his forensic skill in solving homicide cases.

An electronics genius with many of his inventions decades ahead of their time, he owned businesses around the country, including the Waldorf-Anthony Hotel in New York, where he maintained a penthouse apartment and secret laboratory. There was also the "Tepee", his hidden mansion in the Catskills Mountains with its proto-Batcave-style set-up built into the caverns beneath the property, and the "Pueblo" in the Southwest, a hotel/resort built at an oasis by Anthony.

His father was Shean Boru Anthony, an Irishman who had traveled the world as an adventurer, becoming rich in the process. His mother was Fawn Johntom, daughter of a Comanche chief.

Anthony was aided by several others:

- Tom Gentry, Anthony's longtime big and burly best friend, a two-fisted redhead who acted as his loyal Man Friday and served as both his chauffeur and as the pilot of his plane, the Thunderbird II.
- Dawkins, his Cockney butler/valet.
- Mephito, Anthony's grandfather, an ancient and wise Comanche shaman who guarded the Tepee and had taught his grandson everything his people knew about hunting and tracking.
- Delores Colquitt, beautiful blond daughter of Senator Colquitt, and Anthony's love interest and companion on his adventures.

The first ten novels pitted Anthony against a variety of supervillains bent on the destruction of the United States, his muscular body often stripped down Tarzan-style to yellow trunks or loincloth and a pair of moccasins, with the first three stories showing Anthony going up against the sadistic foreign spy/criminal mastermind Rado Ruric who was both a scientific genius and a master of disguise.

After Spies of Destiny, the Anthony stories were changed to a more hard-boiled detective stories. This was probably done by direction of the publisher. The larger-than-life superhero elements were dropped, along with most of his supporting characters except for Tom Gentry.

== Stories ==
1. Dealer in Death, 10/01/40
2. Legion of Robots, 11/01/40
3. Madame Murder, 12/01/40
4. Bloated Death, 01/01/41
5. Killer in Yellow, 02/01/41
6. Murder in Paradise, 03/01/41
7. Murder Syndicate, 04/01/41
8. The Horrible Marionettes, 06/01/41
9. Border Napoleon, 08/01/41
10. Spies of Destiny, 10/01/41
11. I.O.U. Murder, 12/01/41
12. Cold Turkey, 02/01/42
13. Mrs. Big, 04/01/42
14. Needle's Eye, 06/01/42
15. Mark of the Spider, 08/01/42
16. Hell's Ice-Box, 10/01/42
17. The Days of Death, 11/01/42
18. The Caribbean Cask, 12/01/42
19. Murder Between Shifts, 01/01/43
20. Cauldron of Death, 02/01/43
21. Murder's Migrants, 03/01/43
22. Death For a Flying Dutchman, 04/01/43
23. Homicide Heiress, 06/01/43
24. Curse of the Masters, 08/01/43
25. Pipeline to Murder, 10/01/43

== Authorship ==
All novels were published under the house name of John Grange (a reference, perhaps, to legendary football players Jim Thorpe and Red Grange, the former a famous Native American athlete). The first three novels are known to have been written by Victor Rousseau Emanuel. From the sixteenth novel to the end, they were written by Robert Leslie Bellem and W.T. Ballard. The authorship of the others is unknown, but is suspected to be Victor Rousseau Emanuel.

== Reprints and new stories ==
A few of the stories have been reprinted by pulp small presses and fanzines. Altus Press will begin a complete reprinting of the stories starting in the summer of 2009. The first volume has come out, reprinting the first 3 stories.

Ron Fortier's Airship 27 published the first collection of new Jim Anthony stories in 2009, with a second out in 2010, and a new novel in 2011.
