= Les Habits Noirs =

- Cover for a French edition of Les Habits Noirs.
- 1: Les Mystères de Londres (Gentlemen of the Night); 2: Bel Demonio; 3: Les Compagnons du Silence (The Companions of Silence); 4: Jean Diable (John Devil); 5: Les Habits Noirs (The Black Coats: The Parisian Jungle); 6: Cœur d'Acier (Heart of Steel); 7: L'Avaleur de Sabre (The Sword Swallower); 8: La Rue de Jerusalem (Jerusalem Street; The Black Coats: Salem Street); 9: L'Arme Invisible (The Invisible Weapon; The Black Coats: The Invisible Weapon); 10: Les Compagnons du Trésor (The Companions of the Treasure; The Black Coats: The Companions of the Treasure); 11: La Bande Cadet (The Cadet Gang; The Black Coats: The Cadet Gang)
- Author: Paul Féval, père
- Country: France
- Language: French
- Genre: Fantasy, Children's
- Published: 1843–1875
- Media type: Print (hardback & paperback)

Les Habits Noirs (English: The Black Coats) is a book series written over a thirty-year period, comprising eleven novels, created by Paul Féval, père, a 19th-century French writer.

By its methods, themes and characters, Les Habits Noirs is the precursor of today's conspiracy and organized crime fiction. Féval's heroes, from Gregory Temple, the first "detective" in modern detective fiction, to Remy d'Arx, the investigative magistrate, are also the first modern characters of their kind.

In 1862, Féval founded the magazine Jean Diable, named after his eponymous Habits Noirs novel, and Émile Gaboriau, future creator of the police detective Monsieur Lecoq (a hero seemingly unrelated to the villainous Lecoq of the Habits Noirs), was his assistant.

== Novels ==
- Les Mystères de Londres (Gentlemen of the Night, serialized in Le Courrier Français, 1843–44; rep. Comptoir des Imprimeurs Réunis, 1844)
- Bel Demonio (serial. in Le Pays, 1850; rep. Permain, 1850)
- Les Compagnons du Silence [The Companions of Silence] (serialized in Le Journal Pour Tous, 1857; rep. Cadot, 1857)
- Jean Diable (John Devil, serialized in Le Siècle, 1862; rep. Dentu, 1863)
- Les Habits Noirs (The Black Coats: The Parisian Jungle, serial. in Le Constitutionnel, 1863; rep. Hachette, 1863)
- Cœur d'Acier [Heart of Steel] (serial. in Le Constitutionnel, 1865; rep. Hachette, 1865)
- L'Avaleur de Sabre [The Sword Swallower] (serial. in L'Époque, 1867; rep. Dentu, 1867)
- La Rue de Jerusalem [Jerusalem Street] (The Black Coats: Salem Street, serial. in Le Constitutionnel, 1867–68; rep. Dentu, 1868)
- L'Arme Invisible [The Invisible Weapon] (The Black Coats: The Invisible Weapon, serial. in Le National, 1869; rep. Dentu, 1869–70)
- Les Compagnons du Trésor [The Companions of the Treasure] (The Black Coats: The Companions of the Treasure, serial. in Le National, 1870, then after the war 1871–72; rep. Dentu, 1872)
- La Bande Cadet [The Cadet Gang] (The Black Coats: The Cadet Gang, serial. in L'Evènement, 1874–75; rep. Dentu, 1875)

== Cinema ==
Les Habits Noirs (1914), Pathé silent feature directed by Daniel Riche

== Television ==
An O.R.T.F. French TV adaptation was made in 1967, "Les Habits Noirs".
