= Pao Tcheou =

Villain in French novel series

Pao Tcheou is a fictional character from a series of French novels. Referring to himself as "Maitre de L'invisible" ("Master of the Invisible"), due to his ability to turn himself invisible, Pao is a megalomaniacal Chinese villain, evocative of the Yellow Peril and similar to the famous Fu Manchu; indeed he is supposedly his cousin.

Pao Tcheou was created by "Edward Brooker", the nom de plume for a French writer who has never been identified, and the series was continued by the equally pseudonymous "Sam P. Norwood". The first series of novels ran from 1946 to 1947, and the second from 1953 to 1956.

The Pao Tcheou series was massive in its scope, spanning all of the Earth and beyond, including a journey to Mars. The evil conqueror Pao is opposed by the heroic team of Lapertot, a stalwart adventurer, and Professor Faustulus, a learned doctor who assists with the scientific aspects of the adventures. Pao's efforts to take control of the world are many and varied, including robots, atomic bombs, and giant monsters.
