= Frank Howel Evans =

Welsh author

- Born: 1867
- Died: 1931 (aged 63–64)
- Other names: Atherley Daunt; Crutchley Payne

Francis (Frank) Howel Evans (1867–1931) was a Welsh author who wrote for many British story papers such as Chums, The Boy's Own Paper, and The Boys' Friend during the first few decades of the 20th century. He also wrote under the pen names Atherley Daunt and Crutchley Payne. Many of his stories take place in the theatre.

Evans is probably best remembered for his "Old Pawray" stories featuring the retired French detective Monsieur Jules Poiret, likely an inspiration for Agatha Christie's Hercule Poirot. He also wrote six Sexton Blake stories for The Union Jack and The Penny Popular. One of his stories was filmed as In the Shadow of Big Ben (1914), directed by Frank Wilson and starring Tom Powers, Alma Taylor, and Jack Raymond.
