= Marie Nizet =

Belgian writer (1859–1922)

Marie Nizet (19 January 1859 – 15 March 1922), married name Marie Mercier, was a Belgian writer.

== Life ==
Marie Nizet was born in Brussels into a literary family. She was a student at Isabelle Gatti de Gamond's secondary girls' school (Cours d'Éducation pour jeunes filles). Her father, employed at the Royal Library of Belgium, had published patriotic poetry and works on history and librarianship. Her brother Henri was to become a journalist and novelist.

Nizet developed an interest in Romania, perhaps due to the influence of émigrés and students who lodged with the family. Her first poetic works were published in 1878, written during the Romanian War of Independence and before the Congress of Berlin secured Romania's independence, expressed her support for the Romanians and her opposition to Russia's attempts to dominate Romania. Her early work met with some success but her literary career was to be short, ending in 1879 when she married.

Her marriage ended in acrimonious divorce and Nizet was left to raise her son alone. Following her death at Etterbeek in 1922, her son found a collection of love poems, dedicated to Nizet's late lover Cecil Axel-Veneglia, which were published the following year as Pour Axel to critical acclaim.

== Selected publications ==
- Moscou et Bucharest (1877)
- Pierre le Grand à Jassi (1878)
- România (chants de la Roumanie) (1878)
- Le Capitaine Vampire (1879) (translated by Brian Stableford as Captain Vampire ISBN 978-1-934543-01-6
- Pour Axel de Missie (1923)

=== Translations ===
- Linkhorn, Renée & Judy Cochran (eds), Belgian women poets: an anthology (2000)
- Shapiro, Norman R. (ed.), French Women Poets of Nine Centuries: The Distaff and the Pen (2008)
- Stableford, Brian (adapted by), Captain Vampire (2007)
