= Philippe Ward =

French novelist (1958–2025)

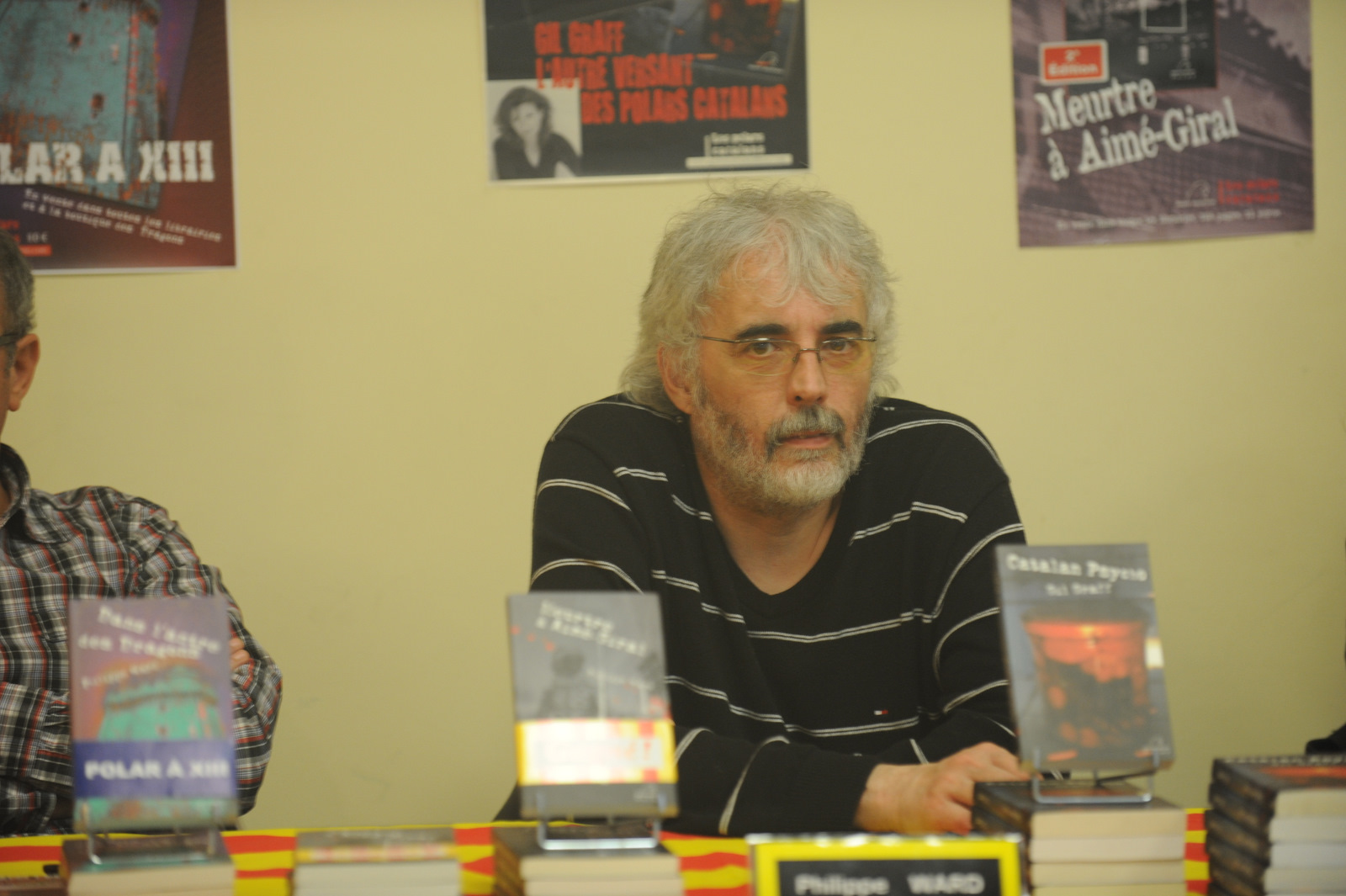
- Ward in 2011
- Born: Philippe Laguerre; 13 July 1958; Bordeaux, France
- Died: 11 September 2025 (aged 67); Pamiers, France
- Occupation: Novelist

Philippe Laguerre (French: [filip laɡɛʁ]; 13 July 1958 – 11 September 2025), better known by the pen name Philippe Ward (French: [filip vaʁd]) was a French novelist.

Ward was primarily well known for his fantasy novels. He also co-wrote and translated with Sylvie Miller.

Ward died in Pamiers on 11 September 2025, at the age of 67.

== Works ==
=== Lasser series ===
- Un privé sur le Nil (2012)
- Mariage à l'égyptienne (2013)
- Mystère en Atlantide (2014)
- Dans les arènes du temps (2015)

=== Independent books ===
- Artahe (1997)
- Irrintzina (1999)
- Le Chant de Montségur (2001)
- La Fontaine de jouvence (2004)
- Meurtre à Aimé Giral (2006)
- Dans l'antre des dragons (2008)
- 16, rue du repos (2009)
- Mascarades (2009)
- Le glaive de justice (2010)
- ..Ceci est mon sang (2011)
- De Barcelona à Montsegur (2012)
- Magie rouge (2014)
- Danse avec le taureau : Serial killer aux fêtes de Bayonne (2015)

=== Novels ===
- Martha (1990)
- Les vignes du seigneur (1998)
- Le mur (2000)
- Prorata temporis (2001)
- After midnight (2002)
- Mau (2002)
- Le fils de l'eau (2003)
- Le survivant (2003)
- Les ferrets invisibles (2005)
- Les chemins de l'esprit (2006)
- Pas de pitié pour les pachas (2006)
- Un futur inimitable (2007)
- Noir Duo (2007)
- La belle au poids mordant (2009)
- N'est pacha qui veut (2009)
- Le crépuscule des maudites (2010)
- Le pacha botté (2010)
- Voir Pompéi et mourir (2012)

== Distinctions ==
- Prix Masterton for Irrintzina (2000)
- Prix ActuSF de l'uchronie for Lasser Détective des Dieux (2013)
