= Neil Penswick =

British writer (born 1960s)

Neil Penswick is a British writer born in the 1960s, known for writing the Doctor Who New Adventure "The Pit".

== Writing career ==
While working as a social worker, Penswick submitted a "very Predator-style" script to Doctor Who, and also won a BBC drama competition with a script Andrew Cartmel described as "a kind of David Lynch homage." He would go on to write "The Pit" for Virgin Publishing. In the mid 1990s, he wrote an episode for the television drama Casualty though the episode never reached the production stage. He then made a short film in June 2012 as, Parental Love, and was assumed for being a recurring contributor to writers Jean-Marc and Randy Lofficier.

== Personal life ==
Penswick's main work was in child protection services as an advisor to prevent child abuse. He then was a specialized social worker. He lives in Britain and spends most of his free time reading and traveling. He was born on 4 April 1962.

== About Doctor Who: Hostage ==
Synopsis

The story would feature the Doctor and Ace encountering soldiers on a mission to take out two sinister, shape shifting creatures, Butler and Swarfe.

Production

Penswick submitted the three-episode story to then Doctor Who script editor Andrew Cartmel. While Cartmel deemed the script too expensive, he liked the short scenes, action and snappy dialogue, leading him to keep Penswick in mind for future writing on the show, however the show was cancelled in September 1989 after its 26th season. Penswick later said of the story's plot:

"It was about an elite group of soldiers sent after shape-changing criminals Butler and Swarfe, who had stolen a new weapon and taken it to an overgrown jungle planet. The end of the first episode had Swafe change in full view into a monster, before it went on the hunt in the second episode. The Doctor and Ace were involved and it turned out that the planet was the last battleground between the Time Lords and the Scaroth [sic]. The end piece was set in a castle — the whole thing had a fairy tale feel — where the criminals intended to ignite the bomb. It was Doctor Who "meets Predator and Aliens."
