= Les Belles-de-nuit ou Les Anges de la famille =

1850 novel by Paul Féval and père

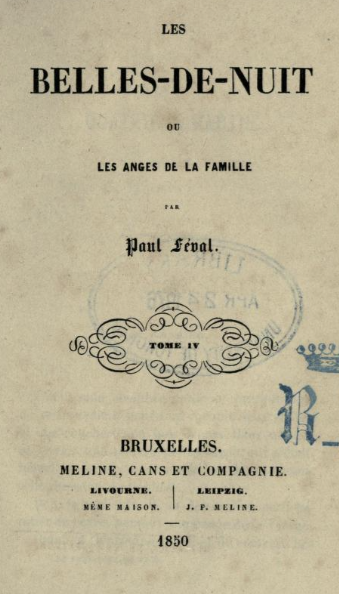
- Title page for Les Belles-de-nuit ou Les Anges de la famille (1850)
- Author: Paul Féval, père
- Language: French
- Genre: Adventure novel
- Publication date: 1850
- Publication place: Belgium
- Preceded by: Le Jeu de la mort ou la Tirelire
- Followed by: Beau Démon

Les Belles-de-nuit ou les Anges de la famille (Beauties of the Night or The Angels of the Family) is an adventure novel by Paul Féval. It was first published as a roman feuilleton in the French newspaper L’Assemblée nationale from the September 21, 1849 to the April 27, 1850. The story takes place from November 1817 to November 1820 in Brittany and in Paris. The book is divided in five parts of unequal length.

== Summary ==
=== Part 1, Le Déris (The Flood) ===
In November 1817, in the Breton town of Redon, three strange characters – two men and a woman – stop at the inn of the Mouton Couronné (The Crowned Sheep) for the night. They are Robert and his accomplice Blaise, aka l’Américain (The American) and l’Endormeur (Sleepy-Maker), and beautiful but soulless Lola. The two men are hard up and Robert, who has just discovered the existence of the Vicomte René de Penhoël, decides to get hold of his estate and fortune. He manages to wrest the Penhoëls’ story from the inn-keeper Géraud and pretends to be a friend of Louis’s, René’s elder brother, who left Brittany fifteen years before, following an unhappy love affair: both he and René had fallen in love with Marthe, an orphan. Everyone thought Marthe was in love with Louis but the latter went away and Marthe eventually married René. Yet the Viscomtesse is still very melancholy and Robert suspects that she never stopped loving Louis.

Robert and Blaise go to the manor – although the boatman Benoît Haligan, who guessed the truth, warned René – and introduce themselves as Louis’s friends.

=== Part 2, Le Manoir (The Manor) ===
Almost three years later, the first steamboat leaves London for Bordeaux. On board is Major Berry Montalt, a mysterious English adventurer who hates Brittany and the Bretons. Nevertheless, he rescues a young Breton sailor who tried to drown himself. The young man is none other than Vincent, René's young cousin, who left the manor five months before: one day he was suffering from fever and drunkenness, he raped his cousin Blanche, with whom he is desperately in love. As Vincent tells Montalt this story, the adventurer goes into a towering rage and accuses Vincent of recalling his own crime to him.

Meanwhile, in Penhoël, René, who has become Lola’s lover, gambles his fortune and estate away. Robert, Blaise and their accomplices, the Marquis de Pontalès, his son Alain and the Maître le Hivain, a dubious lawyer, are almost the masters of the estate. During a party, Marthe discovers that her daughter Blanche is pregnant and thinks that Robert is the father of the unborn child. Her pain is all the greater as she thinks Blanche underwent the same fate as she did years ago.

Diane and Cyprienne de Penhoël, René's cousins and Vincent’s younger sisters, have found out Robert’s schemes. They decide to rob some documents that René signed in Louis’s name and that can help Robert to become the master of the estate. The girls are unmasked and drowned by Bibandier, one of Robert’s accomplice. Robert kidnaps Blanche and has Étienne Moreau, a painter, and Roger de Launoy, René’s adoptive son, thrown out of Penhoël. Soon after the young men depart, the others members of the family are also forced to leave the manor. The Marquis de Pontalès, now master of Penhoël, throws out Robert and Blaise as well.

=== Part 3, Le Voyage (The Journey) ===
In Rennes, a stagecoach is about to leave, bringing Montalt to Paris. Étienne Moreau, who has just left Redon, meets the mogul and tells him his story, without telling him Penhoël’s name. In spite of the respect he instinctively feels towards Montalt, the young man is appalled his immorality. As for Montalt, he is very interested by two girls who travel in another mail coach going to Paris. Strangely enough, they pull down the blinds when Étienne turns towards them. When they reach Laval, Étienne and Montalt stop at an inn and the young man meets Roger, whose departure he did not know of.

When the stagecoach reaches Paris, Montalt suggests Étienne and Roger to settle as painter and secretary in his household. Presently one of the mysterious passengers of the second stagecoach throws out two notes signed "BEAUTY OF THE NIGHT" and addressed to Étienne and Roger, arranging to meet them at Notre-Dame de Paris. The young men, faithful to Diane and Cyprienne, whom they love, refuse to go.

=== Part 4, Paris ===
Robert, Blaise, Lola and Bibandier are now living in Paris under false names, with Blanche. Robert decides to acquaint himself with Montalt, hoping to make him his accomplice to buy Penhoël’s manor.

Marthe, René, Uncle Jean and old Géraud live in a slum, and Diane and Cyprienne, who came through drowning, struggle to survive, singing in the streets. In desperation, they decide to go and ask Montalt, who is interested in them, to help them buy back Penhoël.

During a party at Montalt’s residential hotel, Robert meets the adventurer and tells him how he swindled Penhoël’s out of his estate without telling any names. Meanwhile, two mysterious girls enter the ball, tell Étienne and Roger of the murder of Diane and Cyprienne, and charge Robert with the crime in Montalt’ presence.

Coming back to his hotel, Montalt hears that the girls of the stagecoach – Diane and Cyprienne – want to meet him. They tell him their story but call themselves Louise and Berthe. Montalt takes pity on them and decides to let them live in the hotel as his own daughters. Presently, Bibandier shows Étienne and Roger the girls, saying that Montalt seduced them.

In the meantime, Vincent, who has heard of Blanche’s being kidnapped and his family’s having left Penhoël, manages to reach Paris but is arrested and imprisoned opposite the house that Lola is renting and where Blanche is imprisoned. The girl is pregnant and mourns her family. Diane and Cyprienne, disguised in men, come and set their cousin free, then take her to Montalt’s hotel.

Robert, who now wants to get rid of Montalt, asks Lola to persuade Alain de Pontalès to challenge the Englishman to a duel. Then he tells Vincent, who escaped and witnessed Blanche’s kidnapping, that Montalt ordered it. As a result, the young man challenges Montalt to a second duel. Then Étienne and Roger come, seeking compensation for Montalt’s attitude towards them and the twin sisters. After that, Jean de Penhoël, also deceived by Robert, decide to challenge Montalt to a fifth duel.

Meanwhile, René de Penhoël, who has become nearly mad since he lost his estate, takes advantage of Jean’s having left their slum and Géraud’s being in hospital to try and kill Marthe and commit suicide. They are saved by Diane and Cyprienne. The girls come back to the hotel and Montalt encourages them to tell their real name. Then he tells them his story: he left his family several years before because both he and his best friend were in love with the same girl. Montalt would rather give up his love but he never forgot the girl. Then he gives Diane and Cyprienne a sandalwood box set with diamonds that contains a lock of the girl’s hair. He asks Diane and Cyprienne to burn the lock if he dies and to keep the diamonds. After he leaves, the twins go and aid Blanche, who gives birth to her child.

Montalt goes to the Bois de Boulogne. He kills Alain de Pontalès but not the other four. Jean de Penhoël suddenly recognises him and pronounces him to be his nephew Louis. As they come back to the hotel, they find Robert and his two accomplices, who were trying to rob the sandalwood box. Robert is then accused by Jean, Vincent and the girls. Yet, Montalt agrees to save him if he gives him a letter that Marthe had written to him but never sent. Presently Jean explains that Diane and Cyprienne are Louis and Marthe’s illegitimate children, whom he and his late wife adopted. They decide to go back in Brittany and buy back the estate. But they have got only three days left before Penhoël legally becomes Pontalès’s property.

=== Part 5, Penhoël ===
Robert, Blaise and Bibandier go back to the Mouton Couronné, in Redon, bringing Marthe and René with them. They arrange to meet René on the riverbank, luring him into thinking that he may buy the estate back. They then go to the boatman’s lodge. Benoît Haligan is now dying. They force Maître Le Hivain to bring Pontalès to Haligan’s house. After the Marquis arrives, they order him to help them if he wants to retain the estate, for Penhoël is coming back. Pontalès grudgingly agrees to share Penhoël’s estate with Robert, Blaise and Bibandier and to kill René and Louis if necessary.

When the five of them reach the place of their appointment with René, the latter goes in the boat, scared by a mysterious stranger who has been following him since he left Redon. The stranger, Louis de Penhoël, manages to stop the boat before Bibandier can distance the bank. Pontalès stabs René but is battered to death by Louis, who then kills Robert, Blaise and Le Hivain, while Bibandier runs away. After the killing, Louis tries to bring back his brother, whom he thinks is still alive, but René makes a last dying movement and lets himself slip into water. Then the boat sails away on the river and sinks with the four dead bodies in the Femme Blanche's (White Woman) chasm, in which Robert had ordered Diane and Cyprienne to be drowned.

Meanwhile, Jean de Penhoël has taken Marthe back to the manor. The latter is almost dying after enduring so much sorrow and she wakes up hearing the Beauties of the Night song. Seeing her daughters and Louis, who came back to the manor, she prays: "My God! (…) if it is a dream again, let me never wake up!" (« Mon Dieu! (…) si c’est encore un rêve, faites que je ne m’éveille jamais ! »).

== Characters ==
False names are written in [square brackets].

=== The Penhoëls ===
Diane and Cyprienne de Penhoël, [Louise and Berthe], [Édouard and Léon de Saint-Remy]. Diane and Cyprienne are twin sisters. They were born a few months after Louis de Penhoël left his home. They are both alike and different. Both are brown-haired and look like Louis de Penhoël, but Diane is "tallest, more earnest and perhaps more beautiful than her sister" (« plus grande que sa sœur, plus sérieuse et peut-être plus belle »). Diane has brown eyes, whereas Cyprienne's are dark blue. She also is more serious, more grown up, cleverer and stronger. Cyprienne compares her sister to a captain and herself to her soldier. They love each other very much but Diane sometimes acts with Cyprienne like a mother would do with her daughter. Although they are introduced at the beginning of the novel as Jean’s daughters and the secret of their birth is uncovered at the end of the story only, the reader soon guesses that they are Louis and Marthe’s illegitimate children. They are both devoted to the people they love and show both great courage and naïveté against the danger that threatens their family.

Louis de Penhoël, [Lord Berry Montalt]. René’s elder brother leaves Brittany when his brother tells him that he loves Marthe. Torn between his love for Marthe and his love for his brother, he decides to make a sacrifice of the former. He writes to his brother one year after he left but René does not answer. Towards the time when Blanche was conceived, he came back to Penhoël, but René refuses to let him in. He then goes away for good. He calls himself Berry Montalt, says that he is English, makes a fortune but does not find happiness. Then he grows fond of Vincent, Étienne, Roger, Diane and Cyprienne, whereas he does not even know that they are related to Penhoël. During the duel, he is recognized by Jean de Penhoël. He does not feel grudge against René and tries to save him, but he does not spare Pontalès, nor Robert and his accomplices.

Marthe de Penhoël. She is an orphan who was brought up by the Commandant de Penhoël and his wife after her parents' death. Both Louis and René fall in love with her. Whereas she is in love with Louis, his parents and brother make her think that he never loved her and marries René after he left. Only Uncle Jean and his wife support her and know her secret: they and Benoît Haligan helped her when she gave birth to Diane and Cyprienne, Jean's wife brought up the children as their own. When her daughter Blanche was born, she transfers her whole love to her and displays strictness and sometimes harshness towards Diane and Cyprienne. Her tenderness towards Blanche weakens once only: after her eldest daughters' "death", she reproaches Blanche, ill and asleep, of having rob from them the love they that was due to them. Diane's and Cyprienne's "death" and the kidnapping of Blanche deprives her from her strength and she sinks into apathy until she comes back in Penhoël, where she finds again her daughters, Louis and all those she loves but despaired of seeing again. Marthe's part is a passive one in the novel.

Roger de Launoy. Roger is Marthe's and René's adoptive son. He was adopted because the couple despaired of having a male heir. He is of the same age as Vincent – eighteen at the beginning of the story. Later, it is said that ha has lived for twenty years at Penhoël's, meaning that he has been adopted soon after Louis left.

Although he sometimes seems fickle, he is really devoted to his adoptive mother and deeply in love Cyprienne. The girl's nocturnal getaways make him think she loves someone else. He becomes Étienne Moreau's best friend and loves him as a brother. He is also proud, clever and brave. His affection towards René de Penhoël dies down as the latter gets influenced by Robert and shows less consideration for him. When he is thrown out of Penhoël, he decides to leave Brittany and catch up with Étienne at once.

Blanche de Penhoël. She is Marthe's and René's only daughter and looks like her mother. She is pretty, but has a languishing kind of beauty unlike her half-sisters. She also is a very fragile and naïve girl. Her father thinks she is Louis's daughter, because Louis came back at the time she was conceived. Robert de Blois decides to marry to inherit the estate. She does not play an active part in the novel.

René de Penhoël. He is Louis's younger brother. He is only one year younger and from his childhood, he has been the weaker of the two. Louis used to make a sacrifice of everything for him, so when he fell in love with Marthe, he told his brother of it and Louis decided to make a sacrifice once more and left Brittany. He is mad about his wife but suspects her of being in love with Louis. He is pathologically jealous, even after he became Lola's lover. He even uses violence against Marthe, who is protected by Uncle Jean only. In the end of the story he is ready to let his brother be killed and while dying, he seems to prefer letting himself drown rather than accept Louis's outstretched hand.

Jean de Penhoël is the Commandant de Penhoël's younger brother. He is a poor man and lives thanks to his brother's generosity. He never forgot Louis, whom he loves as his own son. He also loves Marthe, whom he sees as a daughter, and he and his wife decide to adopt their children. He brings Diane and Cyprienne up, telling them to adore God and love Penhoël above all. He recognizes his nephew during the duel.

Vincent de Penhoël. He is Jean's only child. He is secretly in love with his cousin Blanche but does not say anything about it since Blanche is a rich heiress and he is hard up. He leaves Penhoël after he raped her. It is the main difference between Louis and Vincent: Louis leaves Brittany so that his brother can marry Marthe but not because he had sexual relations with her, whereas Vincent goes away because he is ashamed of his act. When he hears that Blanche was kidnapped, he goes to Paris and is imprisoned because of another crime he committed: he killed an officer in a duel. Robert makes him think that Blanche has been kidnapped by Montalt, so that he challenges the Englishman to another duel.

=== Other characters ===
Robert Camel, aka l’Américain (American), [Robert de Blois, the Chevalier de las Matas]. He is twenty-five at the beginning of the story and has been mixing with mobsters for ten years. He is a ruthless, talented actor and he extorts the family's story from old Géraud, the inn-keeper. He is unscrupulous and decides to marry Blanche to inherit the fortune. He kidnaps her and has her guarded by Lola in Paris. He thinks that he can buy Penhoël's Manor with Montalt's money and tries to make an accomplice of him – in vain.

Étienne Moreau. He is a Parisian painter of about twenty in 1820. He is sent for by René to decorate Lola's chamber. Étienne does not know if he has talent – and many people think he has none and say that he is a "dauber who came from Paris to put red and blue upon the walls". Only Roger thinks he is really talented. The relations between Étienne and Roger are much the same as between Diane and Cyprienne. Although they are not related, they love each other like brothers and when Étienne is thrown out of Penhoël he leaves Roger with these words: "Remember that I am your brother and that my home, although small and poor, will always be large enough to shelter us both. « Souviens-toi que je suis ton frère et que ma demeure, si petite et si pauvre qu’elle soit, sera toujours assez grande pour nous abriter tous deux. » The likeliness between Diane and Cyprienne, and Étienne and Roger is also perceptible in their personalities. They have the same qualities and faults. Diane and Étienne are more earnest than Cyprienne and Roger, whereas Cyprienne and Roger are more frivolous than Diane and Étienne. The young men have different ways of behaving towards their girlfriends. Cyprienne's strange behavior makes Roger fear that she does not love him, Étienne trusts Diane in spite of her strange attitude.

Blaise Jolin, aka l’Endormeur (Sleepy-Maker), [the Count de Manteïra]. Blaise is Robert's accomplice. He is physically stronger but not so shrewd than Robert. At the beginning of the story, fate – or Robert's cheating at cards – makes him Robert's manservant. His part is minor since it is Robert who is working toward René's ruin. Yet Blaise does not despair and thinks that he may become the only master of the estate. When the Penhoëls leave, he does not hesitate to cross swords with Robert, but he knows which side is bread is buttered and he makes up with Robert when they are thrown out by Pontalès.

Bibandier, [the Baron de Bibander]. He is a former receiver of stolen goods who was imprisoned in Brest. He introduced Robert and Blaise to each other. A good-humored gangster, he spares Diane's and Cyprienne's lives in exchange for money. He is the only one who survives at the end of the story. After he escaped from penal colony, he lives on in Brittany with his dog as his only accomplice. he hopes that Robert and Blaise will share Penhoël's fortune with him but is bitterly disappointed, so he gets on the right side of Pontalès and then rejoins Robert and Blaise.

The Marquess Basile de Pontalès. He belongs to a poor family who made a fortune during the French Revolution, in 1793. He becomes Robert's accomplice as the latter thinks he can be useful to appropriate the estate. Pontalès himself decides to use Robert to seize the whole estate. Although he is a cautious man, he is dragged by Robert into the "murder" of Diane and Cyprienne. His hate toward Penhoël became a kind of idée fixe and he stabs René when Robert's attention is diverted.

Lola, [The Marchioness d'Urgel]. Lola comes from the side streets of Paris. She used to dance "on a tightrope not to be beaten" before she was taken away by Robert. The relations between them are not unclear. They are not in love: Robert treats Lola almost like a slave and Lola is used to obeying him.

The Count Alain de Pontalès is The Marquess's son. He is described as a wicked and wayward young man. He is passionately in love with Lola and becomes her lover. Lola persuades him to challenge Montalt to a duel during which he will be killed.

François Géraud. He is an inn-keeper of the town of Redon and a faithful servant to Penhoël. He naively tells Robert the story of the family because he thinks him to be a friend of Louis's, then repents himself. He ruins himself to give René money and pay his debts. When the family is forced to leave the Manor, Géraud goes to Paris with them to help them, but is taken ill soon after.

Mr. Protais Le Hivain, aka Macrocephalic. Le Hivain is a dubious lawyer. He is called Macrocephalic (i.e. long-shaped head) by the schoolmaster of the village of Glénac and plays a double game. He seems to be a faithful servant to Penhoël and makes him run into debts. He lets Robert think he is his accomplice but is on Pontalès's side. He is eventually killed by Louis.

Benoît Haligan. He is a boatman, a bonesetter and a former Chouan. He is also psychic and slightly xenophobic, but he is faithful to Penhoël. His gifts for mediumship allow him to guess who Robert really is from the very moment when they meet. He slowly dies but only Diane and Cyprienne come and take care of him? He leaves them his whole fortune – sixty one-hundred-livres coins. He predicts more than once that the three Penhoël girls will die and that Louis will come back too late, but hopes that he is mistaken. The night he is murdered by Robert de Blois, he sees the Penhoëls coming back home in his ecstasy.

==== Nicknames resulting from judicial slang ====
Robert's and Blaise's nicknames (American and Sleepy-maker) result from the slang of the time. Americain (American) results from the vol à l'américaine (American stealing). The crook pretends to be rich (and coming from America, which was considered to be a kind of El Dorado). Endormeur (Sleepy-maker) was a nickname given to the thieves who would operate in trains, putting a narcotic in the passengers' drinks and then robbing them.

== Commentary ==
Paul Féval's novels are often about an heir who disappear several years before coming back. Yet there is an important difference between Les Belles-de-nuit ou Les Anges de la famille and some others stories. In Le Bossu or Le Loup blanc, the heirs disappear against their will: Lagardère kidnaps Aurore de Nevers in order to protect her from Gonzague; Jean Blanc kidnaps Georges Treml after an attempted murder, but the child disappears once more — kidnapped by a street acrobat. In Les Belle-de-nuit, Louis goes away willingly.

Likeliness between the characters are also found in different novels by Féval. Diane and Étienne are as earnest as Lagardère and Aurore, whereas Roger and Cyprienne are much more like the Marquess de Chaverny and Flor. Séid, Montalt's manservant, symbolizes blind obedience; he never questions his master's orders and takes decision only when the circumstances require such a behavior (like Jude Leker in Le Loup blanc). On the contrary, Benoît Haligan does not hesitate to show René that he disagrees with him when he thinks he must do it to protect his master.

=== Publication ===
After the Belles-de-nuit were published in a newspaper, they were published in six volumes by a Belgian publisher in 1850. The novel will be published again in 1850, then in 1859, 1861, 1866 and 1874.

In the second 1850 publication, the novel is followed by Miss Olivia a short story by Paul Féval. 1859 and 1861 publication also contain the short story Les Armuriers de Tolède, also by Féval.

In the end of his life, converted to an uncompromising kind of Roman Catholicism. He rewrote most of his stories, including Les Belles-de-nuit ou Les Anges de la famille in 1887. The story is the same, but some passages are changed, cut or added, and the author wrote an epilogue in which he explains the fate of the main characters. Vincent marries Blanche and makes Penhoël's estate thrive with help from his father Jean. Étienne and Diane settle in Paris and the painter lives on his talents without making use of the diamond Montalt gave his wife. The law having found that Pontalès had seized Penhoël's estate unlawfully, Roger de Launoy buy them back with Cyprienne's dowry. But Marthe dies – killed by the joy of seeing all those she thought dead and by the grieves she has endured for twenty years. Louis spends the rest of his life cherishing her memory, happy to see his own family happy. The end is thus a bit more dramatic because of Féval's new ideas. He must have thought that Louis, after living with impiety, had to repent himself. Louis could only repent with Marthe's dying.

The year before, the book had already been published again under another title: L'Oncle Louis (Uncle Louis).

In 1927 and 1928, the French publisher Albin Michel published the novel in three volumes:

- Diane et Cyprienne [Diane and Cyprienne] (Part 1 + the first eight chapters of part 2)
- L'Aventurier [The Adventurer] (end of part 2 + part 3 + the first five chapters of part 4)
- Les Filles de Penhoël [The Penhoël girls] (end of part 4 + part 5).

In July 2011, Nabu Press published some parts of the novel.

=== Discrepancies in the novel ===
There some discrepancies in the story – in the description of the characters, in their age and in the date. At the beginning of the story, it is said that Louis went away fifteen years ago. The age of the characters is according to this statement: Diane are between fourteen and fifteen, Blanche is twelve, Vincent eighteen, René, thirty-five... The other parts of the story take place three years later, but Féval writes that Louis went away twenty years ago and the age of the characters also changes: Diane and Cyprienne are nineteen, Blanche is seventeen etc.

As for Mr. Géraud, the inn-keeper, he is first described as an old bachelor, then it is said that he was married even when he was cook on a boat.

The physical description of the characters also changes. When they are first described, it is said that Diane's eyes are dark blue, while Cyprienne's are dark. Later, Diane is said to have brown eyes and Cyprienne dark blue ones. Then Paul Féval changed his mind and made Benoît Haligan tell the twins: "You have his [Louis's] wide fiery eyes" ("Vous avez ses grands yeux de feu"), meaning that Louis, Diane and Cyprienne have dark eyes.

René too is described differently in some parts of the story. It is first said that he has chestnut brown hair, then that his hair was blond and became white.

As for Marthe, Féval first describes her as a fair-haired woman, then writes "her black let down hair".

=== Stage adaptation ===
The very year of the beginning of the publication, the novel is adapted as play by Amédée Achard, Paul de Guerville and Paul Féval in 1849. Many changes occurred, more particularly in the number of characters and the end of the story.

=== Translations ===
The novel was translated into several languages, more particularly once into Russian (Ночные красавицы, [Beauties of the Night] and twice into Gertman (Die Nachtschönchen, oder: die Schutzengel der Familie, [Beauties of the Night, or the Guardian Angels of the Family], in 1850 and Die Engel des Hauses, [The Angels of Home], in 1851).

=== Beauties of the night ===
Beauties of the night (in Breton Boked ar sterenn, plural form Bokidi ar sterenn) are creatures of Breton folklore who remind one of the Willis. They are girls who died of a broken heart. Bretons also call "Beauties of the night" the Mirabilis jalapa and the stars.

The Beauties of the night in the story are Diane and Cyprienne de Penhoël, who are also named "Angels of the Family". Blanche may be called a Beauty of the night too, since she is nicknamed the "Angel" and Benoît Haligan always talks of the beauties of the night as if there were three of them.

The legend of the Beauties of the night gave birth to a Breton lament that Paul Féval rewrote in his novel.

Breton lyrics	Literal English translation	Adapted lyrics by Paul Féval	Translation of Paul Féval's lyrics
Krennblac’hig, sterennig, bleuñvennig!	Little flower, little star, little girl!	Anges de Dieu, qui souriez dans l'ombre, Blanches étoiles, vierges, fleurs, Vous qui des nuits semez le manteau sombre, Anges aimés, Pour guérir nos terreurs...	You angels of God, smiling into darkness, You white stars, virgins, flowers, You who sow night's dark cloak, You beloved angels, To heal our fears...
Ar boked ar sterenn a zo ar bleuñvenn karet gant ar Werc’hez Mari. Ar bleuñvenn bihan rosoc’h eget ar rozenn, gwennoc’h al lilienn, ken glas hag ar pers ar baradoz. Ar bleuñvenn a stou, a-veure, heñvel ar gristennez a bed...	Beauty of the night is the Virgin's Mary beloved flower. The little flower pinker than the rose, whiter than the lily, as blue as the azure of Paradise. The flower that bents in the morning, like the Christian woman praying...	Belle-de-nuit, fleur de Marie, La plus chérie De celles que l’ange avait mis Au paradis! Le frais parfum de ta corolle Monte et s’envole Aux pieds du Seigneur, dans le ciel, Comme un doux miel.	Beauty of the night, Mary's flower, the dearest Of those the Angel had put In Paradise! The fresh fragrance of your corolla Goes up and flies away At the feet of the Lord in Heaven, like sweet honey.
Ar boked ar sterenn a zo ar sterenn bihan, diamant glan an neñv. Ar sterenn a re kalon pa eer a-raok na karje an heol en hentoù riv adarre leun gant tasmantoù...	Beauty of the night is the little star, pure diamond of the sky. The star who gives courage when one is wending before sunrise in the cold paths, still full of ghosts...	Belle-de-nuit, pourquoi ce voile, Petite étoile Que le grand nuage endormi Couvre à demi? Montre-nous la vive étincelle De ta prunelle, Qui semble au bleu du firmament Un diamant.	Beauty of the night, what for this veil, You little star That the large asleep cloud Half covers? Show us the bright flash Of your eye, That seems, in the blue of firmament A diamond.
Ar boked ar sterenn a zo ar grennblac’h yaouank marv, an hini goant, an hini zous! marv dre garantez... Ar paourkaezh plac’h disliv a ouel a-hed an dour hag amaint o selaou ar c’haloned trist selaont. An hini goant ha zous na oa nemet c’hwezek vloaz, siwazh! pa gouskjomp hi dindan al louzou... Gant an noz adreñv an haleg eo, gwisket holl e wenn evel ur vestrez. An avel-mañ a glemmgan en ar brankoù, he anal eo... Ar berlezenn emañ oc’h ober lugern an heol mintinek war ar zelienn kouezhet, ur daer he faourkaezh daoulagad eo...	Beauty of the night is the dead young girl, she pretty and gentle! dead of a broken heart... The wretched pale girl who weeps along the river and that sad hearts listen to. The pretty and gentle one who was sixteen, alas! when we laid her out under grass... At night she is under the willows, dressed all in white like a fiancée. This wind that complains in the branches is her breath... This pearl that the sun makes glint on the fallen leaf is a tear from her poor eyes...	Belle-de-nuit, ombre gentille, Ô jeune fille! Qui ferma tes beaux yeux au jour? Est-ce l’amour? Dis, reviens-tu sur notre terre Chercher ta mère? Ou retrouver le lieu si doux Du rendez-vous?… C’est bien toi qu’on voit sous les saules: Blanches épaules, Sein de vierge, front gracieux Et blonds cheveux… Cette brise, c’est ton haleine, Pauvre âme en peine, Et l’eau qui perle sur tes fleurs, Ce sont tes pleurs…	Beauty of the night, you nice shade, O you, young girl! Who closed your eyes to daylight? Is it love? Tell me, do you come back in this world To looking for your mother? Or to see again the so sweet place Of the date?... It is you that one sees under the willow: White shoulders, Virginal breast, graceful brow And fair hair... This breeze is your breath, You wretched soul in torment, And the water that stands out on your flowers are your tears...
