= Belle de nuit =

Belle de nuit is a French phrase meaning "Beauty of the night".

Belle de nuit may refer to:

- Belle de Nuit (horse), a horse winner of the Test Stakes race in 1966
- Belle de nuit (film), a 1933 French film with Véra Korène
- Belle de Nuit, a 2017 French biopic film about Grisélidis Réal
- Les Belles de nuit (US title: Beauties of the Night), a 1952 French language motion picture fantasy directed and written by René Clair

== Plants ==
- Mirabilis jalapa or four o'clock flower, an ornamental plant
- Epiphyllum oxypetalum or queen of the night, a species of cactus
- Oenothera macrocarpa or bigfruit evening primrose, a flowering plant

== See also ==
- Les Belles-de-nuit ou les Anges de la famille, an adventure novel by Paul Féval
