= Fort of Rosemont =

Coordinates: 47°13′19″N 6°00′01″E

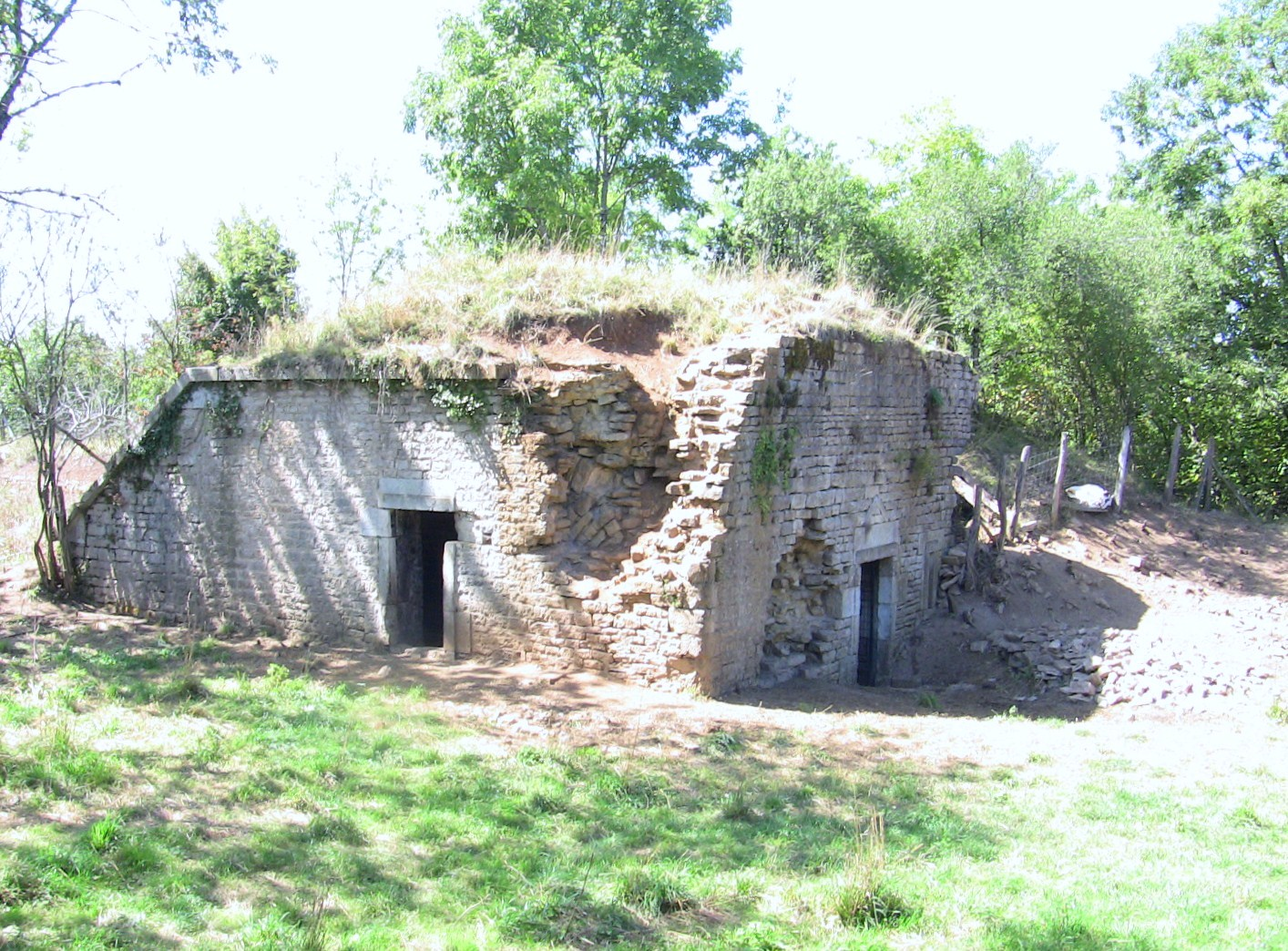
The fort of Rosemont

The fort of Rosemont is a fortification located in the French city of Besançon (Franche-Comté). Built on the summit of the hill of Rosemont during the Franco-Prussian War to support the fort of Planoise and the fort of Chaudanne, it was composed of two buildings (one small fort and one magazine) which had six rooms. However, no battles took place in the city, and Rosemont was dismantled just before World War I. It has since been vandalised; recently the two buildings were restored, but visitors are still prohibited. Rosemont is the smallest fort in the city after the lunettes of Trois-Châtels and Tousey.
