= Vaudey =

Vaudey may refer to:

- Elisabeth de Vaudey (1773–1833), famous for her affair with French Emperor Napoleon I
- Muriel Vaudey (born 1976), French ski mountaineer
- Vaudey Abbey, English Cistercian abbey
- Vellexon-Queutrey-et-Vaudey, commune in the Haute-Saône department in the region of Franche-Comté in eastern France
- Villers-Vaudey, commune in the Haute-Saône department in the region of Franche-Comté in eastern France
