= Sylvain-Denis Houdan Deslandes =

French Historian, Poet, Army Officer

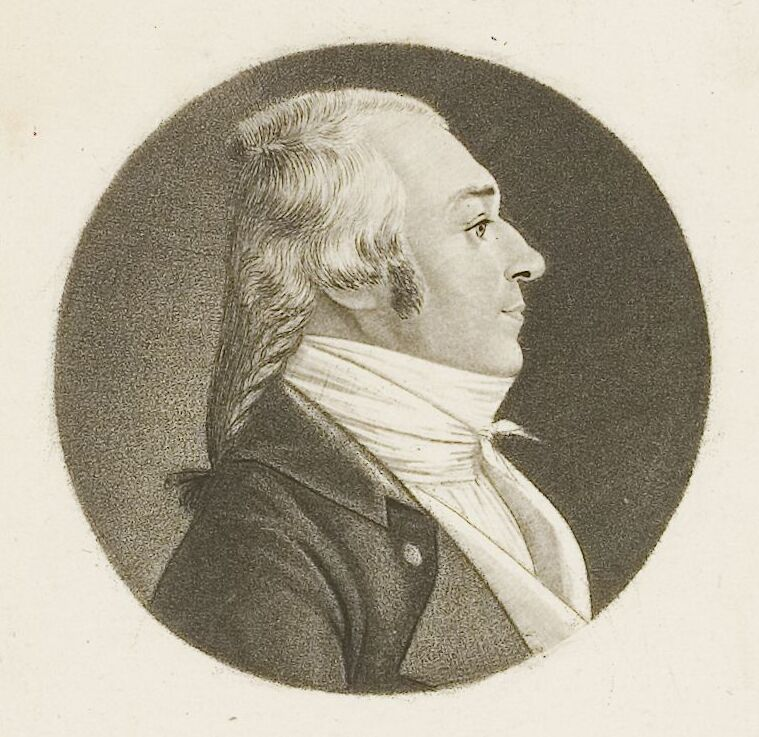
- Born: 5 June 1754; Vernou-sur-Brenne, Touraine, France
- Died: 28 June 1807 (aged 53); Chinon, Centre-Val de Loire, Indre-et-Loire
- Education: école militaire
- Occupation: Army Officer Poet Land Owner
- Known for: Correspondent of the Musée de Paris; Correspondent-national of the Société philotechnique

Sylvain-Denis Houdan Deslandes (5 June 1754 – 28 June 1807) was a French military officer, a correspondent of the Musée de Paris, and a national correspondent of the Société Philotechnique.

He authored The History of the Siege of Gibraltar and Discourse on the Greatness and Importance of the Revolution in North America.

== Biography ==
He was educated at École Militaire and emerged from it as a sub-lieutenant in the Régiment de Bretagne, where he served some time under General Louis Desaix. He served at both the Siege of Minorca and at the Great Siege of Gibraltar, latter he authored the History of the Siege of Gibraltar, by an officer of the French army. A book that has wrongly been attributed to General Jean Le Michaud d'Arçon

He held the rank of captain when the French Revolution began. Although he did not share its principles, he continued to serve until a decree by the National Convention excluded all nobles from the armies.

After retiring with the rank of chef de brigade, he lived with his family on his estate in Chinon. Here he studied and wrote poetry, which was published after his death under the title Wild and Picturesque Nature. He died suddenly on 28 June 1807, at the age of fifty-three.
