= Raoul Billerey =

French actor and stuntman(1920–2010)

Raoul Billerey (1920 - 2010) was a French actor and stuntman.

== Partial filmography ==
- The Three Musketeers (1953)
- Cadet Rousselle (1954) - Un soldat à l'auberge des Trois Pichets / Un garde au Tribunal Révolutionnaire / Un sans-culotte
- The Impossible Mr. Pipelet (1955) - Un pompier (uncredited)
- La fierecilla domada (1956) - Truhán
- Mémoires d'un flic (1956) - Un truand (uncredited)
- Ce soir les jupons volent (1956) - Un photographe
- Fernand cow-boy (1956) - Mario
- The Twilight Girls (1957) - Bill (uncredited)
- Action immédiate (1957) - Fondane
- Back to the Wall (1958) - (uncredited)
- Le Bossu (1959)
- Austerlitz (1960) - Savary
- Captain Blood (1960) - Un homme de Concini (uncredited)
- Captain Fracasse (1961) - Mérindol
- Le Miracle des loups (1961) - Jérôme
- Cartouche (1962) - Un complice de Cartouche
- The Mysteries of Paris (1962) - Amédée
- Le Chevalier de Pardaillan (1962) - Bussy
- Le masque de fer (1962)
- The Reluctant Spy (1963) - Un collaborateur de Thirios
- À toi de faire... mignonne (1963)
- Shadow of Evil (1964) - Christopher Lemmon
- Lagardère (1967, TV series) - Auriol
- Mr. Freedom (1968)
- Naked Childhood (1968) - Roby
- Les camisards (1972) - Un brigadier
- Les yeux fermés (1972) - Bernard
- Les loulous (1976) - Tramoneur - le patron du Favori
- Perceval le Gallois (1978) - Gornemant de Goort
- Family Rock (1982)
- Hors-la-loi (1985) - Le patron de la buvette du dancing
- An Impudent Girl (1985) - Antoine Castang
- Mon beau-frère a tué ma soeur (1986) - Grand Patron
- Betty Blue (1986) - Le vieux policier
- Attention bandits! (1986)
- The Grand Highway (1987) - Le curé
- If the Sun Never Returns (1987) - Denis Revaz
- Le moine et la sorcière (1987) - Siméon
- Noyade interdite (1987) - Le maire
- Chouans! (1988) - Grospierre
- The Little Thief (1988) - André Rouleau
- Après la guerre (1989) - Le maire
- The Handsome Priest (1989) - Grandfather of Sergio
- Un type bien (1991) - Tonton
- Dien Bien Phu (1992) - Le père Bambourger
- Dead Tired (1994) - Le père de Michel Blanc
- Revenge of the Musketeers (1994) - Porthos
- Unpredictable Nature of the River (1996) - Father Fleuriau
- Oranges amères (1996) - Grand-père Tomani
- Jet Lag (2002) - Félix's Father
- Ripoux 3 (2003) - Raoul, le vétérinaire
- À ton image (2004) - Le père de Thomas
