= Austerlitz (1960 film) =

1960 film

- Directed by: Abel Gance
- Written by: Abel Gance; Nelly Kaplan; Roger Richebé
- Produced by: Antoinette Coty; Alexander Salkind
- Starring: Pierre Mondy; Martine Carol; Claudia Cardinale; Leslie Caron
- Cinematography: Henri Alekan; Robert Juillard
- Edited by: Léonide Azar; Yvonne Martin
- Music by: Jean Ledrut
- Release date: 1960
- Countries: France; Italy; Yugoslavia
- Language: French
- Box office: 3,460,070 admissions (France)

Austerlitz is a 1960 French historical drama film directed by Abel Gance and starring Jean Marais, Rossano Brazzi, Martine Carol, Jack Palance, Claudia Cardinale, Vittorio De Sica, Orson Welles, Leslie Caron and Jean-Louis Trintignant. Pierre Mondy portrays Napoleon in this film about his victory at the Battle of Austerlitz. Leslie Caron plays the role of his mistress Élisabeth Le Michaud d'Arçon.

== Plot ==
The first half of this film covers Napoleon's coronation as Emperor and political manoeuvrings while the second half covers the actual battle, where he beat both Austrian and Russian forces in his drive eastward.

== Cast ==
- Pierre Mondy as Napoléon Ier
- Jean Marais as Lazare Carnot
- Martine Carol as Joséphine de Beauharnais
- Elvire Popesco as Lætitia Bonaparte
- Georges Marchal as Jean Lannes
- Vittorio De Sica as Pius VII
- Michel Simon as Alboise
- Rossano Brazzi as Lucien Bonaparte
- Claudia Cardinale as Pauline Bonaparte
- Leslie Caron as Élisabeth Le Michaud d'Arçon
- Ettore Manni as Murat
- Jack Palance as General Franz von Weyrother
- Daniela Rocca as Caroline Bonaparte
- Orson Welles as Robert Fulton
- Nelly Kaplan as Juliette Récamier
- Jean-Louis Trintignant as Ségur son
- Lucien Raimbourg as Joseph Fouché
- Rowland Bartrop as Admiral Horatio Nelson
- Anna Moffo as Giuseppina Grassini
- Janez Vrhovec as François II
- Guy Haurey as Friant
- Jean Mercure as Talleyrand
- Anna Maria Ferrero as Élisa Bonaparte
- Anthony Stuart as William Pitt
- Maurice Teynac as Schulmeister
- Henri Vidon as Fox
- Jacques Castelot as Cambacérès
- Guy Delorme as General Exelmans
- Louis Eymond as Lebrun
- Jean-Louis Horbette as Constant
- Pierre Tabard as General Andrault, count of Langeron
- Claude Carliez as Margaron
- Polycarpe Pavloff as Koutouzoff
- Jean-François Rémi as Duroc
- Jean-Marc Bory as Soult
- Georges Demas as Daumesnil
- André Randall as Whitworth
- André Certes as Berthier
- Antoine Baud as Bernadotte
- Jean Berger as Hédouville
- Raoul Billerey as Savary
- Jean-Louis Richard as Alexandre Ier de Russie
- Pierre Marteville as Joseph Bonaparte
- Pierre Peloux as Daru
- Davout d'Auerstaedt as Davout
- Claude Conty as Dolgoroukov
- Henri Cote
- Sophie Daria
- Henri-Jacques Huet
- Robert Lepagès
- José Squinquel
- André Oumansky
- Dominique Zardi

== Noteworthy ==
Composer Jean Ledrut claimed that "La Marche d'Austerlitz" from his score had been plagiarised by producer/composer Joe Meek in the 1962 pop hit "Telstar". The case was eventually dismissed, but the lawsuit prevented Meek from receiving royalties from the record during his lifetime, and the issue was not resolved in Meek's favour until three weeks after his suicide in 1967. Austerlitz was not released in the UK until 1965, and Meek was unaware of the film when the lawsuit was filed in March 1963.

== Versions ==
The original French version runs longer than the English dubbed international version. The French version contains extra scenes including ones with Napoleon visiting his mistress and of Jean Louis Trintignant imagining the coronation for the palace staff.

== DVD ==
A French DVD was released including interviews with star Pierre Mondy and other participants.
