= Lagardère (TV series) =

French television series

- Genre: Historical adventure
- Based on: Le Bossu by Paul Féval
- Written by: Jean-Pierre Decourt; Marcel Jullian
- Directed by: Jean-Pierre Decourt
- Starring: Jean Piat; Sacha Pitoëff; Jacques Dufilho
- Composer: Jacques Loussier
- Country of origin: France
- Original language: French
- No. of series: 1
- No. of episodes: 6

Production
- Running time: 50 minutes
- Production companies: Les Films Corona; Vé Film

Original release
- Network: ORTF
- Release: 20 September – 25 October 1967

Lagardère is a French historical adventure television series that was originally broadcast by ORTF in six episodes from 20 September to 25 October 1967. It is inspired by the 1858 novel Le Bossu by Paul Féval, set during the early eighteenth century. The series was co-produced by Les Films Corona who released a version of it as a feature film Les aventures de Lagardère in cinemas in November the same year.

== Main cast ==
- Jean Piat as Henri de Lagardère
- Sacha Pitoëffas Le prince Gonzague
- Jacques Dufilho as Passepoil
- Marco Perrin as Cocardasse
- Raymond Gérôme as Philippe d'Orléans
- Jean-Pierre Darras as Peyrolles
- Nadine Alari as Blanche de Caylus/Blanche de Caylus, Blanche de Nevers
- Michèle Grellier as Aurore
- Josée Steiner as Flor
- Dominique Paturel as Chaverny
- Jean-Michel Dhermay as Philippe de Nevers
- Raoul Billerey as Auriol
- Clément Thierry as Taranne
- Michel Soulez-Larivière as Batz
- Marcel Cuvelier as Philippe V
- Bulle Ogier as Mariquita
- Françoise Giret as Jacinta
- Jean-Pierre Carmona as Laho

== Bibliography ==
- Chapman, James. Swashbucklers: The Costume Adventure Series. Manchester University Press, 2015.
- Klossner, Michael. The Europe of 1500–1815 on film and television. McFarland & Co, 2002.
