= On Guard (1997 film) =

- French theatrical release poster
- Directed by: Philippe de Broca
- Written by: Philippe de Broca; Jean Cosmos; Jerome Tonnerre
- Based on: Le Bossu by Paul Féval
- Produced by: Patrick Godeau
- Starring: Daniel Auteuil; Marie Gillain; Vincent Perez; Fabrice Luchini
- Cinematography: Jean-François Robin
- Edited by: Henri Lanoë
- Music by: Philippe Sarde
- Production company: Canal+
- Distributed by: AMLF
- Release date: 3 December 1997 (France)
- Running time: 128 minutes
- Countries: France; Italy
- Language: French
- Budget: $23.6 million
- Box office: $14.6 million

On Guard (French: Le Bossu) is a 1997 French swashbuckler film directed by Philippe de Broca and starring Daniel Auteuil, Fabrice Luchini, Vincent Perez, and Marie Gillain. Adapted from the 1858 historical novel Le Bossu by Paul Féval, the film is about a skilled swordsman named Lagardère who is befriended by the Duke of Nevers. When the duke is attacked by his evil cousin Gonzague, the duke in his dying moments asks Lagardère to avenge him and look after his infant daughter.

On Guard was released on 3 December 1997 in France. The film had 2,385,688 admissions in France and grossed $96,750 in the United States. On Guard received the César Award for Best Costume Design, and eight César Award nominations for Best Film, Best Actor, Best Actress, Best Supporting Actor, Best Cinematography, Best Editing, Best Music, and Best Production Design in 1998. The film also received a BAFTA Film Award nomination for Best Film in 1999.

== Plot ==
In 1700 in Nevers, France, a skilled swordsman named Lagardère (Daniel Auteuil) challenges Duke Philippe de Nevers (Vincent Pérez) to a friendly duel in order to learn his secret lethal maneuver known as the "Nevers Attack". Nevers agrees and quickly dispatches the upstart whom he soon befriends. Nevers learns that he has a "son" by Blanche de Caylus—a fact previously concealed by his cousin and would-be heir, the wicked Comte de Gonzague (Fabrice Luchini). That night Nevers escapes an assassination attempt by Gonzague's men.

Determined to claim his bride, Nevers leaves for Caylus with Lagardère along as his escort. They are followed by Gonzague and his men who plan to murder Nevers before he can marry Blanche and claim his son and heir. Along the way Nevers teaches Lagardère the "Nevers Attack"—an acrobatic sleight of hand that ends with a blade between the opponent's eyes. Soon after, they spot the assassins, and Lagardère is able to delay the attackers long enough to allow Nevers to reach Caylus and marry Blanche. The newlyweds' happiness, however, is short-lived.

When Gonzague and his men arrive at Caylus, they murder the entire wedding party. Lagardère arrives, and after a lengthy sword fight, Nevers is fatally stabbed by a masked Gonzague, who is "branded" by a sword thrust on the hand by Lagardère. Lagardère threatens the unseen killer: "If you do not come to Lagardère," he states, "Lagardère will come to you!" With his dying breath, Nevers implores Lagardère to avenge him and his wife (who he believes was killed) and to look after their infant child. Lagardère flees Caylus with the infant and finds refuge in the mountains in an abandoned farmhouse, where he discovers that the "son" is in fact a girl, who carries a locket naming her as Aurore.

Gonzague's men track Lagardère to his mountain hideaway looking to kill Nevers' rightful heir. Lagardère and Aurore escape with the help of a band of strolling players who convince the pursuing killers that Lagardère and Aurore have plunged to their deaths in a mountain torrent. After Gonzague's men leave, Lagardère and Aurore join up with the strolling players. Back in Nevers, after attending the funeral of her daughter — the coffin actually contains a wax doll — Blanche retires to a convent, and the evil Gonzague is named executor of her estate.

Sixteen years later, Lagardère and Aurore (Marie Gillain) are still with the players. After witnessing Lagardère defend her against three outlaws using sophisticated swordplay with a stick, Aurore asks about his past. Lagardère keeps his past hidden, but he teaches her the "Nevers Attack". One night after a performance, Aurore is taken to a party given by one of Gonzague's men, Louis-Joseph, and is soon assaulted by the host. Using fencing skills she learned from Lagardère, Aurore escapes her attacker, killing him using the "Nevers Attack". When Gonzague learns how his "finest blade" was killed, he suspects that Aurore is still alive; his suspicions are confirmed when Aurore's tomb is opened revealing a decayed wax doll. Gonzague then orders his men to find and kill her.

Lagardère sets out to plan his revenge on Gonzague. After revealing to Aurore that she is the daughter of the late Duke of Nevers, and that her mother is still alive, he gains employment as Gonzague's secretary disguised as a hunchback, makes contact with Blanche revealing that her daughter is alive, and then engineers a stock market raid on shares in the Mississippi Company supposedly on behalf of Gonzague — in fact he purchases the stock using gold provided by Blanche for her daughter's benefit.

When Aurore is captured by Gonzague's men, Lagardère executes a daring rescue. That night, the Regent Philippe d'Orléans arrives prepared to name Gonzague a royal agent to Louisiana. The ceremony is interrupted, however, by Lagardère who escorts Aurore into the hall, introducing her as the majority holder of the Mississippi Company stock. Blanche confirms Aurore is her daughter. Lagardère then discards his disguise and accuses Gonzague of murdering Duke Philippe de Nevers. As proof he exposes Gonzague's hand — the one he branded at the scene of the murder. In the swordfight that follows, Lagardère kills Gonzague using the "Nevers Attack". Aurore then instructs Lagardère to kiss her, and the two embrace each other.

== Cast ==
- Daniel Auteuil as Lagardère
- Fabrice Luchini as Gonzague
- Vincent Pérez as Nevers
- Marie Gillain as Aurore de Nevers
- Yann Collette as Peyrolles
- Jean-François Stévenin as Cocardasse
- Didier Pain as Passepoil
- Charlie Nelson as Esope
- Claire Nebout as Blanche de Caylus
- Philippe Noiret as Philippe d'Orléans
- Jacques Sereys as Caylus
- Renato Scarpa as Paolo
- Ludovica Tinghi as Ornella
- James Thiérrée as Marcello
- Urbain Cancelier as Argenson
- Sacha Bourdo as Giuseppe
- Margot Marguerite as Bergues
- François Levantal as The Knight
- Jean Antolinos as Magistrat
- Simon Doniol-Valcroze as Agioteur d'Ursulines
- Xavier Doumen as Spadassin cour de ferme
- Etienne Draber as Un courtier
- Gérard Gros as D'Esparon
- Jean Le Rouzic as Chapelain Caylus
- Thierry Nenez as Domestique Caylus
- Jacques Villa as Chambellan

== Production ==
=== Filming locations ===
On Guard was filmed on location in France at the Château-Ville-Vieille, in Hautes-Alpes, the Hôtel de Sully in Paris 4, Le Mans in Sarthe, and the Place des Vosges in Paris 4, and various locations in Queyras in Hautes-Alpes.

== Release ==
On Guard was released on 3 December 1997 in France.

== Reception ==
=== Critical response ===
On Guard received generally positive reviews in the United States. In his review in The New York Times, A. O. Scott described the film as "full of durable cinematic pleasures: a little sex, a lot of sword fighting and a plot that combines heady passion with complicated political intrigue." Scott singled out Auteuil's performance delivered with "unabashed gusto and unexpected warmth."

In his review for Salon.com, Charles Taylor called On Guard "one of the best swashbucklers in movie history", writing, "For sheer entertainment it puts nearly everything else that's playing to shame. De Broca's film is a delight from top to bottom, packed with romance, adventure, beautifully executed swordplay and a sumptuous period look." Taylor described Auteuil's performance as "simply wonderful" and that "his range seems to be as wide as that of almost any actor now working in the movies". Taylor continues:

The glory of his role in On Guard is that it's basically a showcase for that range. Auteuil's compact build and the precision he has always brought to his physical movements make him particularly suited to the elegant brio of fencing scenes. And his imitation of a hunchback to get close to Gonzague in the film's last act provides him with a great opportunity for clowning. Auteuil puts on a raspy voice; he walks through scenes stooped over and rolling his eyes so that you might almost believe you're looking at Groucho's French ancestor ... He makes Lagardère one of those screen heroes who feel close to us instead of one we regard from an admiring distance.

In his review in the Los Angeles Times, Kevin Thomas called the film "an enchanting, richly detailed period piece" and arguably Philippe de Broca's "most substantial film." Thomas goes on to write:

Indeed, On Guard has been made much in the same spirit as Richard Lester's 1974 version of The Three Musketeers in that it has been made by a filmmaker with a sense of humor and an affection for the swashbuckler; but resisting the easy spoof, De Broca has made it as emotionally engaging as it is amusing.

In his review on the What's on TV website, Jason Best writes, "As adroit and artful as his hero, de Broca gets the tone of Le Bossu perfectly right—romantic, thrilling and with a sense of fun that never slips into parody or self-mockery." In his review on the Foster on Film website, Matthew Foster wrote, "On Guard is the kind of fun Swashbuckler that Hollywood has forgotten how to make. A few subtitles are well worth the price for some stirring adventure."

On the review aggregator web site Rotten Tomatoes, the film holds an 87% positive rating from top film critics based on 31 reviews.

=== Accolades ===
Award	Category	Nominee	Result	Ref
British Academy Film Award	Best Film, Foreign	Patrick Godeau, Philippe de Broca	Nominated	
Cabourg Film Festival Award	Best Actor	Vincent Perez	Won	
César Award	Best Costume Design	Christian Gasc	Won	
César Award	Best Film	Philippe de Broca	Nominated	
César Award	Best Actor	Daniel Auteuil	Nominated	
César Award	Best Actress	Marie Gillain	Nominated	
César Award	Best Supporting Actor	Vincent Perez	Nominated	
César Award	Best Cinematography	Jean-François Robin	Nominated	
César Award	Best Editing	Henri Lanoë	Nominated	
César Award	Best Music	Philippe Sarde	Nominated	
César Award	Best Production Design	Bernard Vézat	Nominated	

== See also ==
- Le Bossu (1959)
