= Le Bossu (novel) =

French historical adventure novel by Paul Féval

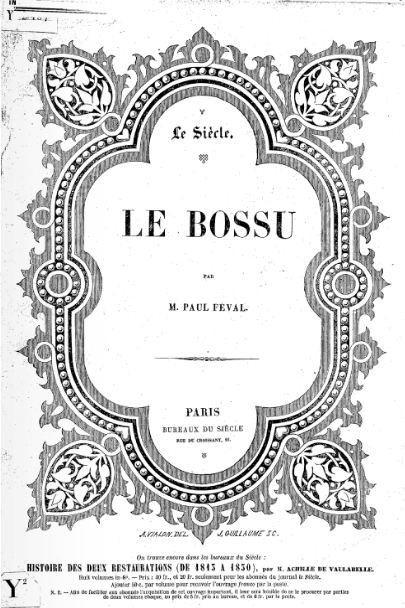
Original title page of Le Bossu, 1858

Le Bossu (transl. The Hunchback) is a French historical adventure novel by Paul Féval, first published in serial parts in Paris in 1858.

Loosely based on real events, the story is set in France in two distinct periods, 1699 and 1717, and incorporates real historical characters such as Philippe II, Duke of Orléans.

== Plot ==
Such is the oath given by the adventurer Lagardère to the wicked Prince de Gonzague, who has plotted to murder the daughter and seize the fortune of the dashing Duc de Nevers. In the first volume, Le Petit Parisien, the Prince de Gonzague murders the Duc de Nevers. Henri Lagardère rescues Nevers' daughter Aurore and raises her in exile, where she makes friends with a gypsy girl named Flor. The second volume, Le Chevalier de Lagardère, describes Lagardère's triumph over the Prince de Gonzague.

Proverbial quote

Si tu ne viens pas à Lagardère, Lagardère ira à toi! ("If you don't come to Lagardère, Lagardère will come to you!")

— Paul Féval, Le Bossu

== Influence ==
The novel is one of a number of works such as The Three Musketeers (1844) which helped define the genre of "swashbuckler" novel, known in French as a "roman de cape et d'épée".

Lagardère's promise of revenge – "Si tu ne viens pas à Lagardère, Lagardère ira à toi!" – became a proverbial phrase in the French language.

Paul Féval's son, himself named Paul Féval, borrowed his father's hero('s son) for his own series of "Lagardère"('s son) novels.

== Adaptations ==
Le Bossu has formed the basis for a large number of film versions, including:

- two silent (French) versions in 1912-1913 and 1925;
- one first speaking (-French) version out of theater, in 1934;
- two Spanish-speaking versions, in 1943–44 by Jaime Salvador and in 1955;
- one French version in black and white in 1944, by Jean Delannoy (later director of The Hunchback of Notre Dame starring Anthony Quinn and Gina Lollobrigida, in 1956), with Pierre Blanchar as Lagardère & this (other) hunchback;
- perhaps the most famous version in France, in colour, of 1959, by André Hunebelle with Jean Marais as the double character of the Bossu and Lagardère (also starring normand humourist and actor Bourvil, as manservant Planchet, like for instance in "The Longest Day", "The Brain" or "The Christmas Tree", etc.); famous on the other coast of Channel, particularly because its frequent diffusions on French TV for several generations;
- Lagardère a television version produced in 1967 with Jean Piat, subsequently edited into two films and released in cinemas, and 2005 with Bruno Wolkowitch;
- Le Bossu (released as On Guard in English-speaking countries), directed by Philippe de Broca in 1997, with Daniel Auteuil (Lagardère/the Hunchback), Marie Gillain (Aurore de Nevers) and Fabrice Luchini (Gonzague).

The novel was also made into an opera in 1888.
