= Jean Le Michaud d'Arçon =

French general (1733–1800)

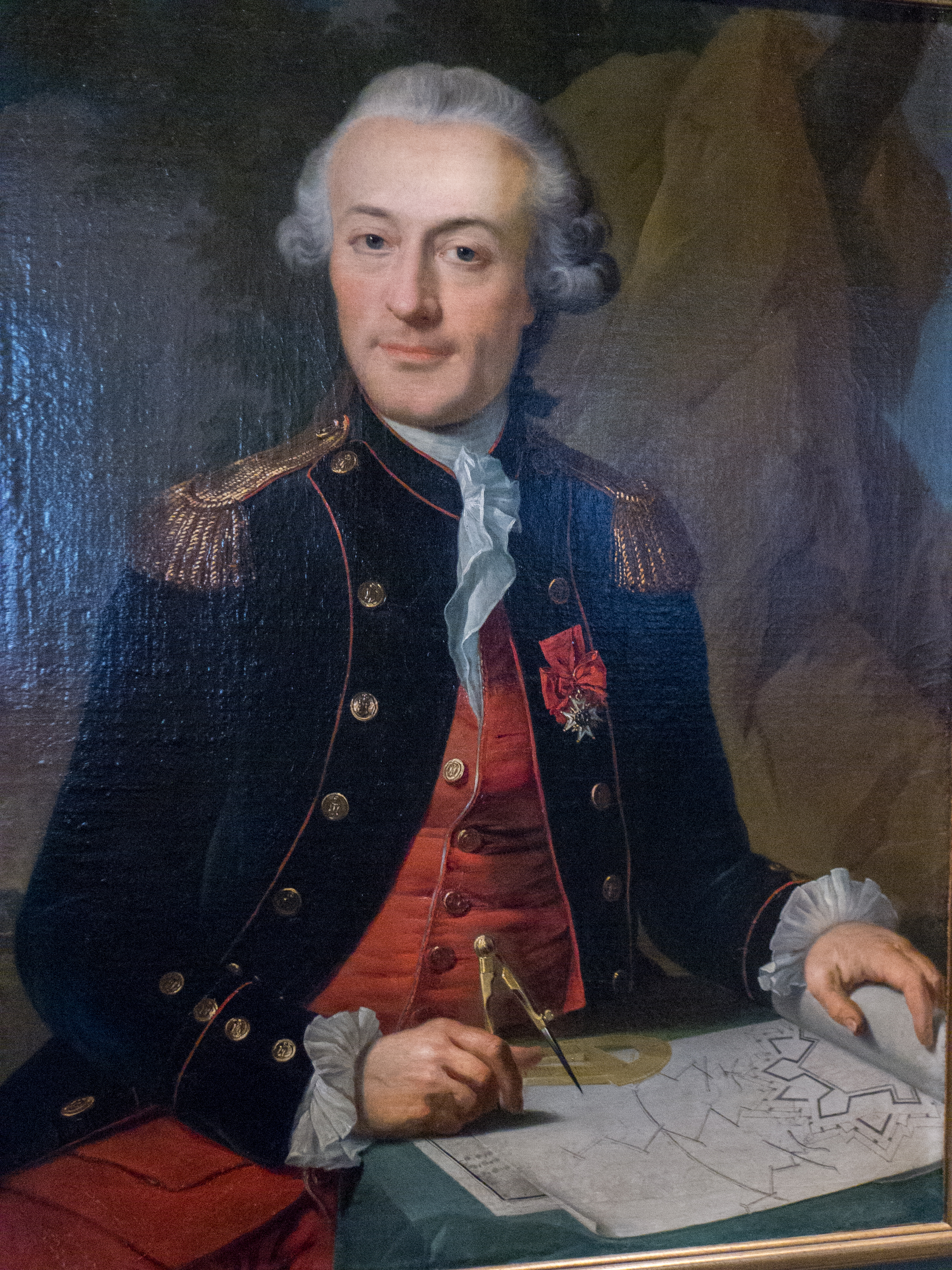
- Le Michaud at his drawing table
- Born: 18 November 1733
- Died: 1 July 1800 (aged 66)

Jean Claude Eléonore Le Michaud d’Arçon (18 November 1733 – 1 July 1800) was a French general, specializing in fortification. His designs include the forts at Pontarlier and Fort-Dauphin in Queyras.

== Life ==
=== Early life ===
He was the son of a lawyer who also wrote several short works on ancient custom of the Franche-Comté. Jean Claude was born in Besançon and was originally intended for a career in the church – he was sent to view a parish to win him round to this career, but he was keener on an army career, drawing and mapping fortifications instead of studying Latin. When someone was sent to draw his portrait for his parents, he opted to be shown in the dress of an engineer not a clergyman and his father agreed to support his choice of career. He studied at the École royale du génie de Mézières in 1754 and was made an engineer-in-ordinary the following year, fighting with distinction in the Seven Years' War, particularly in the defence of Hesse-Kassel in 1761.

=== Mapping and Gibraltar ===
In 1774 he was charged with mapping the southern Alps, the Jura and the Vosges. To speed up his work he invented a new form of ink wash painting with only one brush. In 1774 and 1775 he got into a debate with comte de Guibert over ordre profond versus ordre mince and ended up publishing two pamphlets entitled Correspondance sur l’art militaire which (as with all his writings) showed many new engineering ideas but also several neologisms and mistakes.

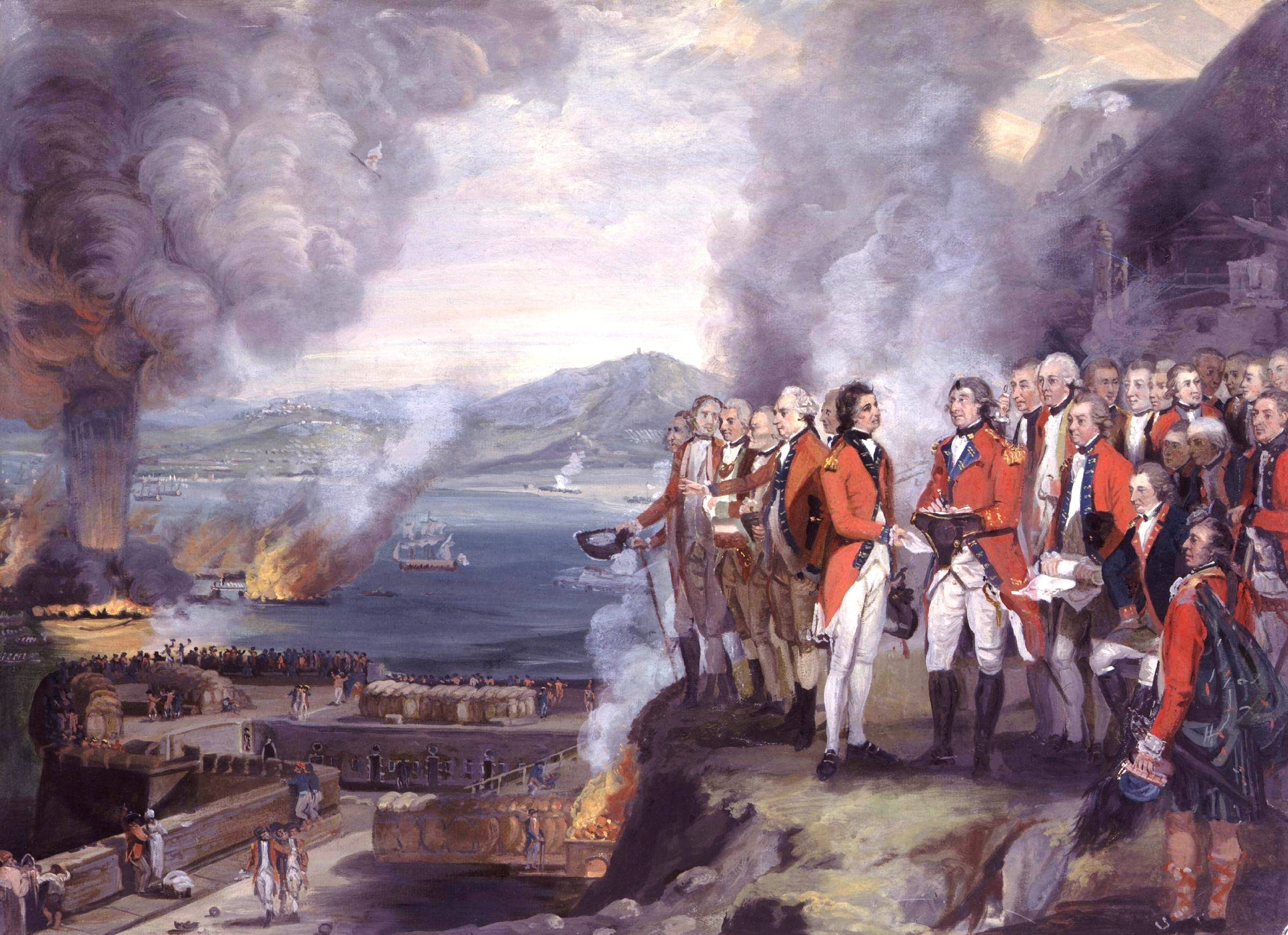
The attack on the floating batteries at Gibraltar.

Attached to marshal Broglie's force in 1780, he looked for ways to win the siege of Gibraltar. Attacking by land was impossible and so d’Arçon began designing "unsinkable and fire-proof batteries" intended to breakthrough from the coast in tandem with other batteries advancing the British rear from inland. These floating batteries would have strong thick wooden armour and water pumped around them to avoid fire breaking out, whilst old cables would also deaden the fall of enemy shot and their ballast would counterbalance the guns' weight. They would also be supported by ships of the line and bomb ships, who would try to draw away and split up the enemy fire. Five machines with two rows of batteries and a single row of five batteries would make up a total of 150 guns.

The Spanish enthusiastically received the proposal and D'Arcon sailed close to shore under enemy fire in a skiff to get more accurate calculations and intelligence. The attack took place on 13 September 1782 and was a complete failure. According to the Biographie Universelle (Michaud, 1843) some of its officers had the "evident intention of making [the attempt] fail" – two of them set off but eight followed too far behind, meaning that the first two drew all the enemy fire. Instead of having these ten ships retire to rejoin the rest of the force, orders were given to set fire to all ten to avoid them falling into enemy hands. This "reduced General d'Arcon to despair, and he was deeply resentful of the failure for the rest of his life", printing a vindication in 1783 under the title "Mémoires pour servir à l’histoire du siège de Gibraltar, par l’auteur des batteries flottantes". Jealousy between the Spanish and French officers had caused the plan to fail but the British governor of Gibraltar, George Eliott, praised D'Arcon.

=== French Revolution ===
He wrote and published an article on backward-firing batteries and on the outbreak of the War of the First Coalition he initially fought in the Army of the North under Charles François Dumouriez before being promoted to maréchal de camp on 13 June 1791. The Committee of Public Safety made him a member of the military committee charged with the direction of the war. He was sent on a reconnaissance mission to Mont Saint-Bernard in 1793, but there he was denounced and forced to retire to Saint-Germain, where he drew up a plan for a French invasion of Holland. He then became a divisional general and he and Pichegru successfully captured the fortress at Breda in January 1795, though that campaign damaged his health and forced him to leave active service.

=== Academia and death ===
In February 1795 he became professor of fortification at the École centrale des travaux publics, where he presented it as a combination of other sciences with important economic and political implications. Printed by order of the government, his last work was Considérations militaires et politiques sur les fortifications, summarizing all his previous work.

He was appointed to the Sénat conservateur in 1799 by Bonaparte during the latter's time as First Consul, but died at the château de la Tuilerie in Auteuil aged 67 the following year. Until his death he was a non-resident member of the geography section of the Institut de France. One of the Lunettes of Trois-Châtels and Tousey was named after him, whilst his daughter Élisabeth le Michaud d'Arcon de Vaudey was a lady in waiting to empress Josephine and mistress to Napoleon I.

== Published works ==
1. Réflexions d’un ingénieur, en réponse à un tacticien, Amsterdam, 1773, in-12°;
2. Correspondance sur l’art de la guerre, entre un colonel de dragons et un capitaine d’infanterie, Bouillon, 1774, deux parties, in-8°;
3. Défense d’un système de guerre national, ou analyse raisonnée d’un ouvrage intitulé : réfutation complette du système de M. de Mesnil-Durand (1779), Amsterdam, in-8°, 283 p.
4. Conseil de guerre privé sur l’événement de Gibraltar en 1782 (1785), in-8°
5. Mémoires pour servir à l’histoire du siège de Gibraltar, par l’auteur des batteries flottantes, Cadix, Hernill, 1783, in-8°
6. Considérations sur l’influence du génie de Vauban dans la balance des forces de l’État, 1786, in-8°
7. Examen détaillé de l’importante question de l’utilité des places-fortes et retranchements, Strasbourg, 1789, in-8°
8. De la force militaire considérée dans ses rapports conservateurs, 1789 (Lire en ligne)
9. Réponse aux mémoires de M. de Montalembert sur la fortification dite perpendiculaire, 1790, in-8°
10. Considérations militaires et politiques sur les fortifications (an III, 1795), impr. De la République, in-8°, Paris.

== Bibliography (in French) ==
- Marie-Nicolas Bouillet and Alexis Chassang (ed.), " Jean Le Michaud d'Arçon " dans Dictionnaire universel d’histoire et de géographie, 1878
- Biographie universelle ancienne et moderne : histoire par ordre alphabétique de la vie publique et privée de tous les hommes (Michaud), article "Arçon"
- J. Girod de Chantrans – Notice sur la vie et les ouvrages du général d’Arçon (imprimerie de Daclin, Besançon, an IX-1801, réimpr. chez Magimel, Paris, An X-1802).
- Jean-Marie Thiébaud et Gérard Tissot-Robbe, Elisabeth Le Michaud d’Arçon, maîtresse de Napoléon, Yens (Suisse), Cabédita, 2006
- " Jean Le Michaud d'Arçon ", in Robert et Cougny, Dictionnaire des parlementaires français, 1889 [détail de l’édition]
