= Le Bossu (1959 film) =

1959 film

Le bossu
- Directed by: André Hunebelle
- Written by: Jean Halain dialogue Pierre Foucaud; André Hunebelle
- Based on: Le bossu by Paul Féval
- Produced by: Paul Cadeac d'Arbaud
- Starring: Jean Marais; Bourvil; Sabine Sesselmann
- Cinematography: Marcel Grignon
- Edited by: Jean Feyte
- Music by: Jean Marion
- Distributed by: Lux Compagnie Cinématographique de France
- Release dates: November 26, 1959 (Eastern Germany); January 13, 1960 (France)
- Running time: 104 minutes
- Countries: France; Italy
- Language: French
- Box office: 5,845,980 admissions (France)

Le Bossu is a French-Italian adventure film starring Jean Marais and directed by André Hunebelle. The film also featured Bourvil, possibly the most popular French comedian of the time. So successful was the formula that Hunebelle teamed up the same two actors for his next adventure film, Captain Blood.

== Plot ==
Duke Philippe de Nevers (Hubert Noël) is an influential and popular man who is married to a beautiful wife called Isabelle (Sabine Sesselmann). His rival Philippe de Gonzague (François Chaumette) hates him enough to organise an attempt on him. The Duke is accompanied by Henri de Lagardère (Jean Marais) when de Gonzague's henchmen altogether attack him. Lagardère cannot save his friend because the both of them are hopelessly outnumbered. He has to escape in order to save the Duke's daughter and swears revenge. Together with his old buddy Passepoil (Bourvil) he raises the little girl in Spain. At the same time he returns frequently to France where he detects confronts his friend's murderers and puts them to the sword one by one until only their former leader is left. Finally he discovers that Philippe de Gonzague is the man for whom he is looking.

== Production ==
The film was shot between May 19 and July 28 in the "Franstudio" of Saint-Maurice and in the Pyrénées-Orientales. The scene showing how three henchmen are sent to Spain for Lagardère and the duke's daughter were shot at the Pont du Diable (Céret).
Maître d'armes André Gardère was the accountable instructor concerning the choreography of all fencing scenes.
Guy Delorme, who would play Comte de Rochefort in Bernard Borderie's 1961 version of The Three Musketeers appears here as a henchman.
Sabine Sesselmann was dubbed by Gilberte Aubry (as Aurore de Nevers) and Jacqueline Porel (as Isabelle de Caylus).

== Cast ==
Actor	Character
Jean Marais	Henri de Lagardère alias le Bossu
Bourvil	Passepoil
Sabine Sesselmann	Aurore de Nevers; Isabelle de Caylus
François Chaumette	Philippe de Gonzague
Jean Le Poulain	Monsieur de Peyrolles
Hubert Noël	Duke Philippe de Nevers
Paulette Dubost	Lady Marthe
Paul Cambo	Philippe II, Duke of Orléans
Edmond Beauchamp	Don Miguel
Georges Douking	Marquis de Caylus
Guy Delorme	henchman

== See also ==
- On Guard (1997)
