= Paul Féval, fils =

French adventure novelist

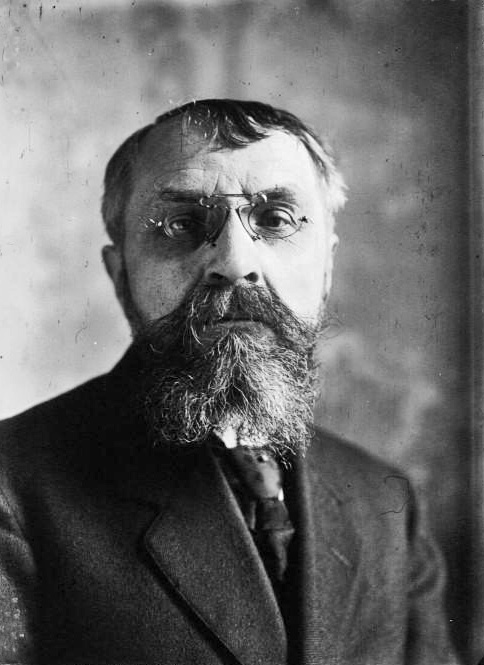
Paul Féval, fils

Paul Auguste Jean Nicolas Féval (called Paul Féval fils) (25 January 1860 – 15 March 1933) was a French adventure novelist, like his father Paul Féval, père. He was the third of eight children and the eldest son of Paul Féval, who was 42 years old and at the height of his success when Paul Féval fils was born.

Paul Féval fils became famous for writing sequels and prequels to his father's popular swashbuckler novel Le Bossu [The Hunchback] (1857), starting in 1893 with Le Fils de Lagardère [The Son of Largardère]. In 1914, he wrote Le Fils de d'Artagnan [The Son of d'Artagnan]. After that he published a more ambitious saga, pitting d'Artagnan himself against Cyrano de Bergerac.

Paul Féval fils' The Years Between series (French title d'Artagnan contre Cyrano) published in 1925 was written with M. Lassez and consists of four books: The Mysterious Cavalier, Martyr to the Queen, The Secret of the Bastille, and The Heir to Buckingham. These books supposedly fill in the missing twenty-year gap of d'Artagnan's life that Alexandre Dumas, père omitted between his stories of The Three Musketeers and Twenty Years After. Feval's stories take place in 1641, one year after Edmond Rostand's play Cyrano de Bergerac takes place.

In it, young Cyrano befriends a "Mystery Knight", who is revealed as the illegitimate son of the Duke of Buckingham and Anne of Austria, the Queen of France. On the other side politically is d'Artagnan who is helping Cardinal Richelieu and his successor, the wily Mazarin, to kidnap young George to use as leverage on the Queen to enlist Spain on the side of France. But d'Artagnan is still loyal to the Queen's family and uses his mission to help her son reclaim his inheritance. At first enemies, d'Artagnan acquires a grudging respect for young Cyrano, who is a little jealous of his elder. They then become true friends and allies. Aramis guest-stars.

Alone, in 1928, Féval fils wrote a further series of three stories called d'Artagnan and Cyrano Reconciled (French title d'Artagnan et Cyrano réconciliés) which are set directly after Twenty Years After. The stories in this series are: State Secret, The Escape of the Man in the Iron Mask, and The Wedding of Cyrano. These stories take place between 1649 (the year that Twenty Years After ends) and 1655, the year that Cyrano dies. In English, these three stories have been published into two books (one and a half stories in each book), and they are called Comrades at Arms and Salute to Cyrano.

In this sequel, d'Artagnan and Cyrano are good friends united by their respect for the Queen and their enmity towards the now-Cardinal Mazarin, who kidnaps George and uses his cunning to force the Queen to become his lover. With the help of Aramis, the two heroes team up to rescue George from his prison at the Mont Saint-Michel, and also rescue the Man in the Iron Mask (Louis XIV's twin brother, as per Dumas). When civil war threatens, the two heroes are forced to side with the Queen, young Louis XIV and, to their dismay, Mazarin, against the rebels who want to use the Man in the Iron Mask. The latter is eventually recaptured and sent to the Chateau d'If.

In the third part, Roxane is now willing to marry Cyrano, while d'Artagnan has proposed to her sister, Françoise. The wedding occurs at the Saintes Maries de la Mer. Barbary Coast pirates raid the town and capture d'Artagnan and the two women. Cyrano rushes to the rescue; unfortunately, he is fatally wounded and dies at the end of the novel before he could marry a willing Roxane.

Paul Féval fils also wrote two science fiction novels. During 1922 and 1923, he collaborated with writer H.J. Magog on a great, rambling serial entitled Les Mystères de Demain [The Mysteries Of Tomorrow] (1922–23), an obvious homage to Eugène Sue's Les Mystères de Paris. In it, the good scientist Oronius fights the evil schemes of an evil German mad scientist, Hantzen, and his female accomplice, a Hindu mystic, Yogha. Les Mystères de Demain takes a kitchen sink approach to the genre, using every cliché: hidden lair on top of the Everest, "carnoplastic" surgery, soul transfers, mountain dwarves, salamanders at the Earth's core, germ warfare, the return of Atlantis, etc.

In 1929, Féval fils wrote Félifax, the story of the eponymous Tarzan-like, man-made hybrid tiger-man and his adventures in India and England, pitted against British detective and successor of Sherlock Holmes, Sir Eric Palmer. The two "Félifax"-novels, L'Homme tigre and Londres en folie (1930), were published in English as one book, Felifax the Tiger Man.

== Sources ==
- Author and Book info.com
