= Le Loup blanc =

1843 novel by Paul Féval

The White Wolf
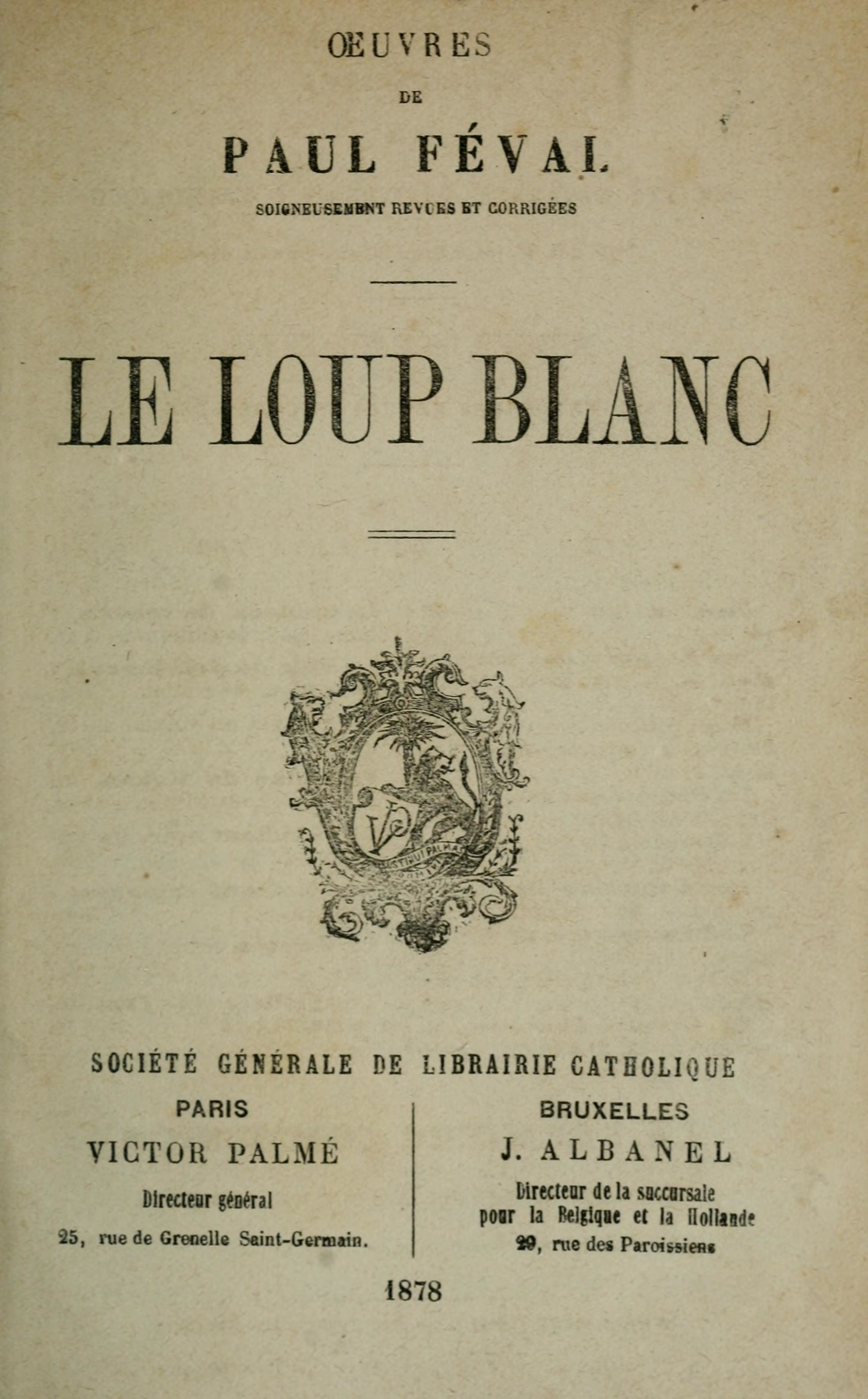
- Author: Paul Féval
- Original title: Le Loup blanc
- Language: French
- Genre: Historical novel
- Publication date: 1843
- Publication place: France
- English publication date: 1848

Le Loup blanc (The White Wolf) is a French historical novel by Paul Féval, père, first published in France in 1843.

The story takes place in Brittany in 1720 and 1740 and incorporates a real historical character: Philippe II, Duke of Orléans.

== Plot summary ==
Nicolas Treml de La Tremlays is a pro-independence Breton lord. He decides to go and fight in duel with Philippe II, Duke of Orléans: if he wins Brittany will be free, but if he loses he will be sentenced for crime of lèse-majesté. Before he leaves Brittany, he makes an agreement with his cousin Hervé de Vaunoy so that his grandson Georges Treml will not be deprived of his possession.

But Georges is just a five-year-old child and Nicolas is put in the Bastille with his servant Jude Leker. In Brittany Hervé tries to drown the boy but an albino peasant called Jean Blanc rescues him. Georges disappears however.

About twenty years later in 1740, the Breton forest of Rennes has become the Wolves' den: the Wolves are poor peasants who want to take revenge of the lords who oppress them. Their leader is called the White Wolf. A young officer of the King, Captain Didier, is sent out to bring them to heel.

== Characters ==
- Captain Didier. He is an orphan and has been brought up by an acrobat, Lapierre, who used him as a way of coaxing the public. He is noticed by Louis Alexandre, Count of Toulouse, who takes him on as a page, and later as a valet de chambre. He became a Captain of the Mounted Constabulary. He is assigned the mission of getting rid of the Wolves in the Forest of Rennes and protecting the convoy that will escort the takings of taxes. The reader soon guesses that Didier is none other than Georges Treml himself.
- Hervé de Vaunoy. Vaunoy belongs to the lower nobility. He affirms that he is a cousin of Nicolas Treml and calls himself "Vaunoy de La Tremlays". Nicolas Treml contests this kinship and brings Hervé to justice. When his son dies, Nicolas withdraws his complaint and welcomes Hervé at La Tremlays. The latter coaxes him into thinking he is a faithful cousin and Nicolas makes him the depositary of his whole estate before leaving for Paris. Hervé gets rid of Georges Treml, oppresses the peasants of the forest and even manipulates the Intendant of Brittany. He tries to have Didier murdered at all costs.
- Jean Blanc (John White) is a very poor peasant. He and his father survive thanks to Nicolas Treml. He is an albino and thus despised by most of men and women. A clever man but subject to terrible fits of delirium, he likes pretending to be really insane. IT allows him to talk to Nicolas Treml as if he were an equal man. He is also very proud and devoted to his ill father, whom he heals tenderly. Being devoted to the Tremls, he saves little Georges but abandons him during a fit. He then constantly looks for him. He becomes a charcoal maker and seller and calls himself Pelo Rouan. He becomes the Wolves' leader and is nicknamed the White Wolf. He has a daughter, Marie.
- Jude Leker. Jude is Nicolas Treml's squire. He is not very clever, but faithful to his master. Once he is released from the Bastille, he comes back in Brittany in order to give Georges the papers and money that will allow him to become the master of La Tremlays. When he hears about the child's disappearance, he makes up his mind to find Jean Blanc, hoping the latter can help him.
- Alix de Vaunoy. She is Hervé's daughter, described as a "noble creature whose charming face was less perfect than her mind, and whose mind was not even worth her heart". She falls in love with Didier, who loves another girl. Gifted with self-denial, she is ready to marry the Intendant of Brittany to help her father but refuses after meeting Didier.
- Marie Rouan. Marie is Jean Blanc's daughter. She is nicknamed Fleur-des-Genêts (Broom flower) because of her beauty and hair color. She falls in love with Captain Didier. Their meeting is told differently in the two versions of the novel: in the first version, Didier gets lost in the forest and enters the Rouans' house while Pelo is away. Marie then falls in love with him. In the second version, the meeting is described in more a romantic fashion: Marie is pursued by "French soldiers" and saved by Didier. She is a shy, wild, umbrageous, daring and religious girl, and is ready to brave all kinds of danger to save Didier.
- Nicolas Treml de La Tremlays. A fiercely pro-independence Breton lord, he has a chivalrous conception of things that will lead him toward his ruin. When his son dies, he agrees to consider Hervé de Vaunoy his cousin because he hopes that Vaunoy will be an adoptive father for Georges. Sent into the Bastille in 1719, he dies in 1737.
- Antinoüs de Béchameil, Marquis of Nointel. Béchameil is the Intendant of Brittany. The character is based on Louis de Béchameil. He is a greedy man but not very clever, and is manipulated by Hervé de Vaunoy, who promises him to give him his daughter in marriage in order to escape the tax authorities.
- Lapierre. He is an acrobat and brought up Didier, whom he used as a way of coaxing the public. When Didier is noticed by the Count of Toulouse and appointed valet de chamber, and then Captain of the Mounted Constabulary, Lapierre becomes a valet of Vaunoy's. Later, he will twice attempt to murder Didier.

== Translations ==
The novel was translated into English under several titles in the 19th century: The White Wolf (1848) The White Wolf, or, The Secret Brotherhood: a romance (1852) and The White Wolf of Brittany (1861). In 2019 a new translation by Jean-Marc and Randy Lofficier entitled The White Wolf was published by Black Coat Press.

== Adaptations ==
Le Loup blanc was adapted for French television in 1977 by Jean-Pierre Decourt. It starred Jacques Rosny as Jean Blanc, Jacques Weber as Didier and Claude Giraud as Hervé de Vaunoy.

The novel was translated in Breton by Ernest ar Barzhig in 1977.
