= Élisabeth de Vaudey =

French courtier

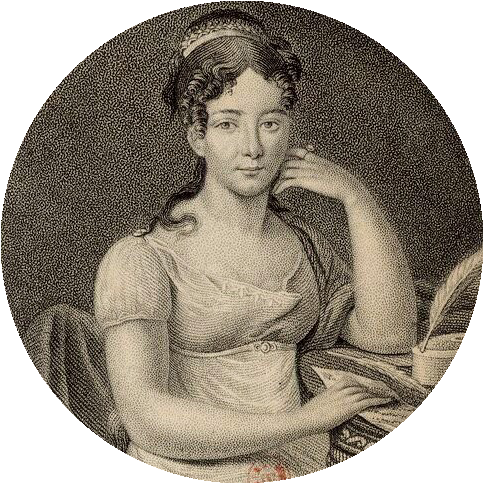
Engraving of Élisabeth de Vaudey

Élisabeth-Antoinette Le Michaud d'Arçon de Vaudey (27 October 1773, in Besançon – 1833?) was a French lady-in-waiting (Dame du Palais). She was famous for her affair with the French Emperor Napoleon, which was a cause of a violent scene between the Emperor and the Empress Joséphine shortly before their coronation.

== Life ==
She was born daughter of general Jean Le Michaud d'Arçon and in 1790 married at the age of 16 to captain François-Xavier-Octave Barberot de Vaudey de Vellexon, who emigrated the year after.

Elisabeth de Vaudey was a member of the lower nobility, described by her contemporaries as "a very pretty woman, witty, a musician, with a nice voice, well educated, but also very much an intriguer." By another she is described as "charming, entirely graceful, entirely sweet, with a pretty face, very good teeth, admirable blonde hair, an aquiline nose (if a bit long, hooked and of plain character), a remarkable hand, a very small foot."

=== Lady in waiting ===
She was chosen to be a lady-in-waiting for the Empress Joséphine, and took her oath at the Château de Saint-Cloud on 1 July 1804. On 24 July, de Vaudey was with the Emperor on a trip to visit the waters of Aix-la-Chapelle to improve his fertility. On this trip, de Vaudey caught Napoleon's attention and became his favorite mistress at the time. The affair was tumultuous and short-lived, however, and was the scene for one of the most famous romantic episodes of Napoleon. Eventually Joséphine's jealousy became aroused and she grew to suspect that the two were having an affair.

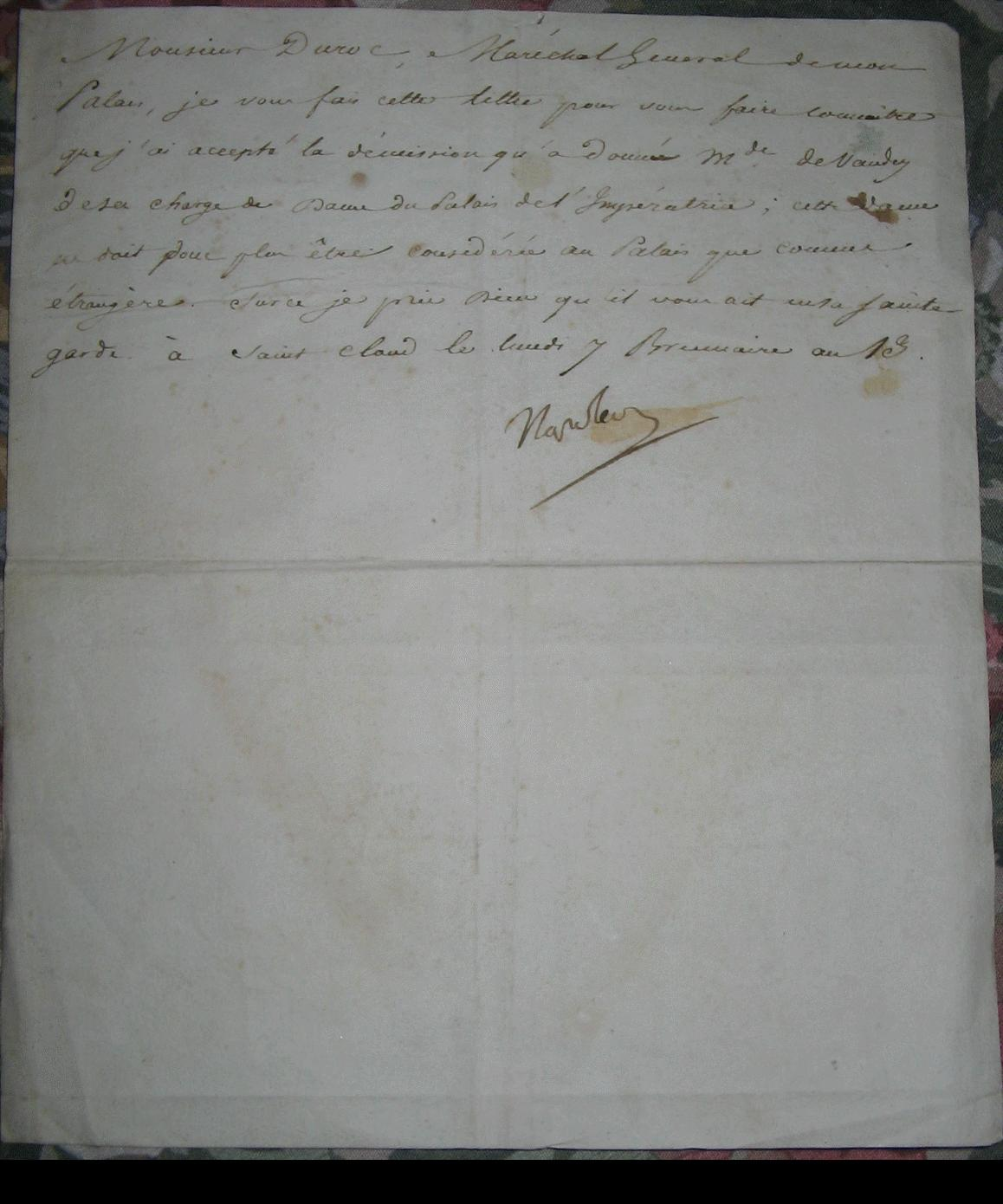
The letter in which Napoleon accepted the resignation of Mlle. de Vaudey

On 25 October of the same year, while Joséphine was in the salon entertaining guests at Saint-Cloud, through the window she saw de Vaudey quickly leave her apartment. She suspected something, and after telling her confidant Mme. de Rémusat her plans, she went to Napoleon's chamber only to find him absent. There was a small staircase which led from Napoleon's room to a small apartment on the higher level and after climbing the staircase Joséphine heard the two of them talking, and even mentioning Joséphine's name. Joséphine froze and then knocked on the door and ordered them to open it. After a long delay, the door was opened, with the room in obvious disarray. De Vaudey broke into tears. Napoleon, who had experienced the jealousy of his wife on previous occasions, was red with anger. Joséphine, although she feared the consequences, lashed out at the two of them with fierce remonstrances. Before Napoleon could respond, she left quickly and returned to the salon in a state of anxiety. Soon after, Napoleon approached her in her bedchamber and gave vent to his fury. He said he was sick of her spying on him, and was going to divorce her and marry a woman who could give him an heir. The threat was too much for Joséphine and she broke down. Napoleon's anger was abated only after his adopted daughter soothed him and encouraged him to reconcile with her mother. Eventually the two made up, and only a few weeks later were crowned Emperor and Empress by Pope Pius VII at Notre-Dame Cathedral. Mme. de Vaudey meanwhile had fled the palace that same day and was soon ordered by Napoleon to resign her post. The official reason was that she was a terrible spendthrift and was constantly in debt due to her insatiable appetite for shopping and "having fun" and always looked to the Imperial treasury to provide her with funds.

Although this is true, one cannot mistake the timing of this episode, and it is likely that the affair of 25 October contributed in no small part to her departure. De Vaudey submitted her resignation letter to Joséphine, but without "going into any details", as she was ordered to do. She lost her title and imperial allowance on 29 October 1804 (7 brumaire, an XIII).

== Death ==
She died in poverty in a poor house in Paris.

== Portrayal in popular culture ==
Elisabeth de Vaudey figures as a character in Abel Gance's 1960 film Austerlitz.

== References and further reading ==
- Avrillion, Marie Jeanne. Memoires de Mademoiselle Avrillion, Premiere femme sa chambre de l'imperatrice, sur la vie privee de Josephine. Sa famille et sa cour. (Paris: Garnier Freres, 1896)
- Masson, Frederic. Napoleon et les Femmes, 4e ed. (Paris: Paul Ollendorff, 1894).
- Remusat, Madame de. Memoires, 1802-1808, publies par son petit-fils Paul de Remusat. (Paris: Calmann-Levy, 1879-1880, 3 vols., t. II, pp. 44–47).
- Thiebaud, J.-M. & Tissot-Robbe, G. Elisabeth le Michaud d'Arcon: Maitresse de Napoleon. (Yens sur Morges: Cabedita, 2006).
- Vaudey, Mme. de. Souvenirs du Directoire et de l'Empire. (Paris: Imprimerie de Cosson, 1848).
