= Karl Schulmeister =

Austrian double agent for France during the reign of Napoleon I

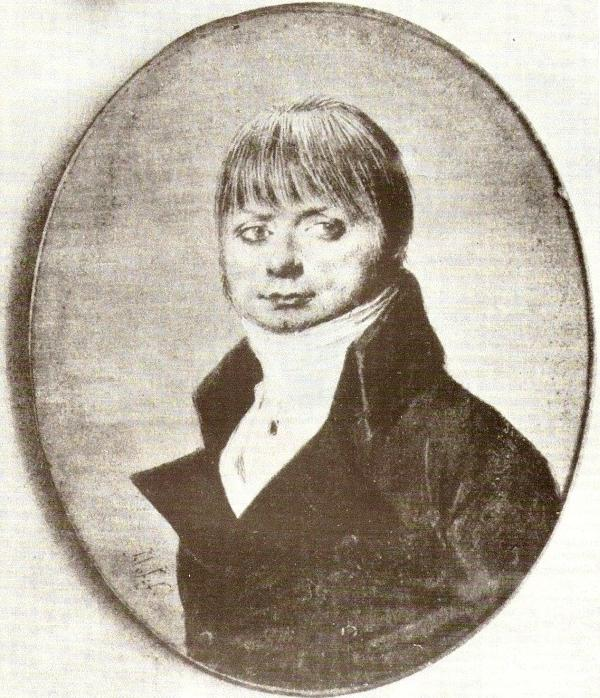
- Portrait of Karl Ludwig Schulmeister
- Born: Karl Ludwig Schulmeister; 5 August 1770; Neufreistett, Baden
- Died: 8 May 1853 (aged 82); Strasbourg, France
- Other names: Charles Louis Schulmeister
- Occupations: Spy, smuggler
- Known for: Double agent for France under Napoleon I

Karl Ludwig Schulmeister (Charles Louis Schulmeister) was born on 5 August 1770 in Neufreistett, Baden (now Rheinau) and died in 1853 in Meinau, Strasbourg. He is known for his career as an Austrian double agent for France during the reign of Napoleon I.

Schulmeister was the son of a sub-intendant who enrolled him as a cadet in the hussars of Conflans at 15 years old, which he left quickly. In 1788 he became an actuary (a secretary that drafted public documents) in the bailiwick of Kork, on the right bank of the Rhine. He eventually left to dedicate himself to farming, and in 1792 married the daughter of the director of the mines of Sainte-Marie-aux-Mines.

The unrest in France gave him the opportunity to begin smuggling, a profitable and dangerous activity. He began at the Rue des Récollets street in Strasbourg as a simple "transporter", then quickly rose to be the chief of a network operating on both banks of the Rhine. These large scale operations laid the foundations of his fortune. He opened a factory in 1800 without giving up his smuggling activities and drifted into trading information as well as goods, doing sporadic espionage on the Rhine and Germany. He started dedicating himself exclusively to espionage in 1804.

In 1804, Schulmeister was presented to Napoleon by aide-de-camp Jean Rapp in Paris, where he was given a rank in the army and assigned to Savary. Clever, shrewd, and loyal to Napoleon, Schulmeister became one of the most skilled and discreet agents of the imperial police.

At the beginning of the 1805 campaign, while the Austrian general Karl Mack was besieged in Ulm, he entered the city through a backdoor in disguise and met with Mack several times, posing as a Hungarian. These encounters are believed to have led to Mack's inexplicable surrender after the Battle of Ulm. He was tricked into believing there was a coup d'état to overthrow Napoleon and that his soldiers would soon leave. Schulmeister even had a fake newspaper fabricated to further persuade him. This allowed Mack to remain in Ulm awaiting his allies, which constituted his greatest military blunder.

On a different mission, he was captured by the Austrians, who intended to execute him, but he escaped. His audacity lead him to go so far as to participate in a council of war in the presence of the Emperor of Austria after bribing a general.

Napoleon appointed him Commissioner General of Police in Vienna after taking the city, a position he held from November 1805 to January 1806. He managed to maintain order throughout the occupation with a small force. However, he made the mistake of remaining in Vienna after the French troops departed. He was arrested on March 31, 1806, and imprisoned for three months.

After the Treaty of Pressburg in 1805, he bought the Canardière estate in Meinau, south of Strasbourg, where he retired.

The Prussian campaign recalled him to the army and he was given command of a small vanguard composed of part of the ^{1st} Hussar Regiment and the ^{7th} Chasseurs à Cheval. After the Battle of Waren, he was ordered to capture the town of Wismar. He took it on the night of November 4, 1806, by taking fifteen officers and a hundred men comprising the town's garrison as prisoners.

His information led to the French capture of Louis-Antoine-Henri de Bourbon and also contributed to the victory at Austerlitz. Schulmeister also acted as a General in Napoleon's army, undertook espionage missions that took him into England and Ireland, and was appointed commissioner of police for Vienna during Napoleon's second occupation in 1809. At the peak of his career, he was director of the French Secret Service, but he ended life as a modest tobacconist in Strasbourg after the Hundred Days ended Napoleon's rule. Several books (in German and in French) have been written about him:

- L. F. Dieffenbach, Carl Ludwig Schulmeister, der Hauptspion, (1897)
- A. Elmer, Napoleon's Leibspion, (1931)
- Gérald Arboit, Schulmeister, l'espion de Napoléon, Paris, Edilarge, 2011, 176 pages
- Abel Douay, Gérard Hertault, Schulmeister. Dans les coulisses de la Grande Armée, Paris, Éditions de la Fondation Napoléon - Nouveau Monde Éditions, série Biographies, 2002, 350 p.
- Alexandre Elmer, L'Agent secret de Napoléon, Charles-Louis Schulmeister, Paris, Payot, 1932 [réédité en 2006 chez Lavozelle].
- Paul Muller, L'espionnage militaire sous Napoléon Ier. Ch. Schulmeister, Paris, Berger-Levrault, 1896.
