= Jean Piat =

French actor and writer

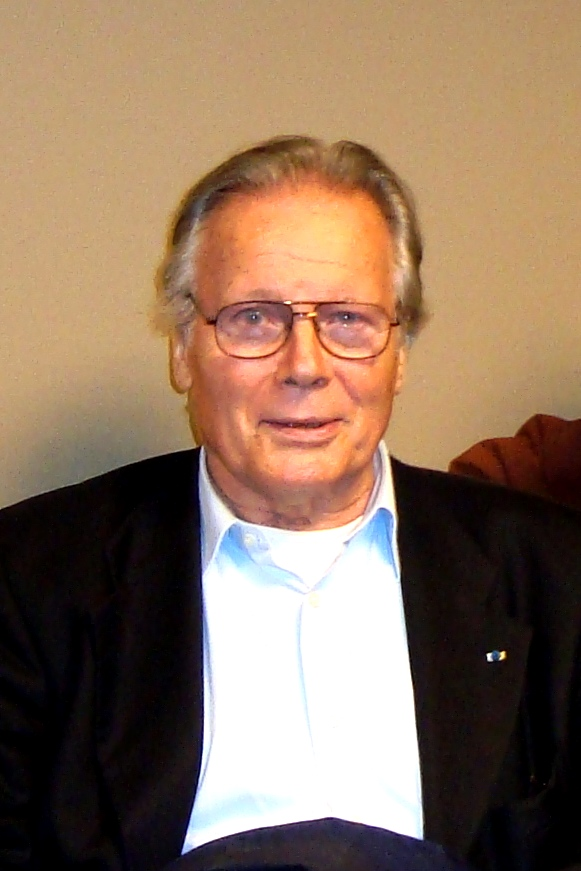
- Piat in October 2008
- Born: 23 September 1924; Lannoy, France
- Died: 18 September 2018 (aged 93); Paris, France
- Occupation: Actor
- Years active: 1947–2017
- Spouse: Françoise Engel
- Children: Dominique and Martine

Jean Piat (French: [ʒɑ̃ pja]; 23 September 1924 – 18 September 2018) was a French actor and writer.

== Life ==
Piat was born in Lannoy, Nord. He enlisted in the Comédie-Française on 1 September 1947, and became a member on 1 January 1953. He left the Comédie-Française on 31 December 1972, and became an honorary member the following day. He was an officer in the Légion d'honneur and the Ordre des Arts et des Lettres, and a grand officer in the Ordre national du Mérite. He was married to actress Françoise Engel (who died in 2005), and was a professor in the dramatic arts of the Simon Course.

He died on 18 September 2018, at age 93, of a heart attack, five days before his 94th birthday.

== Theater ==
=== Roles in the Comédie-Française ===
- Victor Hugo's Ruy Blas (An usher, Gudiel, an alguazil, Don Manuel Aeias, Don César de Bazan)
- Man of LaMancha (Don Quixote)
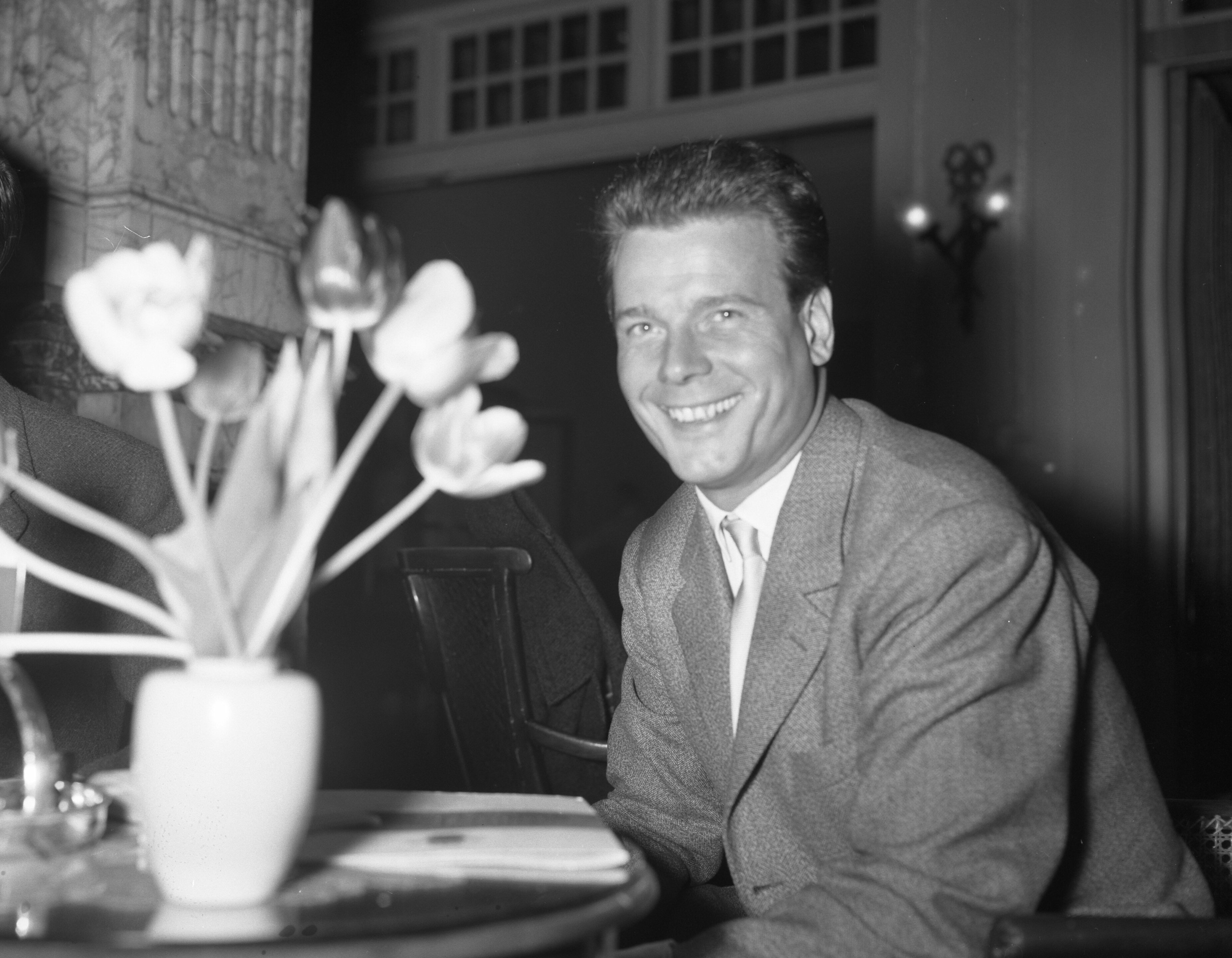
- Jean Piat in 1960
  Edmond Rostand's Cyrano de Bergerac (A guard, Bellerose, a musketeer, Cadet, Brissaille, Jodelet, Cyrano
- Pierre Beaumarchais's The Barber of Seville (Figaro)
- Molière's The Miser (La Flèche)
- Eugène Marin Labiche's The Voyage of Mister Perrichon (Daniel Savary, Joseph)
- Pierre de Marivaux's Le Jeu de l'amour et du hasard (Pasquin)
- William Shakespeare's Othello (Gentleman)
- William Shakespeare's As You Like It (Amiens)
- William Shakespeare's Romeo and Juliet (Benvolio)
- Molière's Le Bourgeois gentilhomme (Covielle)

== Filmography ==
=== Acting ===
- 1947: Rouletabille joue et gagne as Joseph Rouletabille
- 1948: The Lame Devil (Le Diable boiteux) as Figaro in The Barber of Seville
- 1948: Rouletabille contre la dame de pique as Joseph Rouletabille
- 1951: Clara de Montargis as Jean Claude
- 1953: The Porter from Maxim's as André de Velin (as Jean Piat sociétaire de la Comédie Française)
- 1955: Napoléon as Junot (uncredited)
- 1958: Le bourgeois gentilhomme as Cléonte, amoureux de Lucile
- 1959: Le mariage de Figaro as Figaro
- 1961: Les moutons de Panurge as Serge
- 1967: Lagardère (TV Mini-Series, 6 episodes) as Henri de Lagardère
- 1968: Tower of Screaming Virgins as Bouridan
- 1969: The Milky Way (La Voie lactée) as The Jansenist
- 1970: Rider on the Rain (Le Passager de la pluie) as M. Armand
- 1972-1973: Les Rois maudits (TV Mini-Series) as Robert d'Artois
- 1974: La rivale as Pierre
- 1979: Ciao, les mecs as L'avocat
- 1999: A Monkey's Tale as Sebastian (voice)
- 2003: Kaena: The Prophecy as Le grand prêtre (voice)
- 2007: Go West! A Lucky Luke Adventure as Spike Goodfellow (voice)

=== Voice acting ===
- Lawrence of Arabia (Thomas Edward Lawrence (Peter O'Toole))
- Kaena: The Prophecy (Grand Priest (Gary Martin))
- The Lion King (Scar (Jeremy Irons))
- The Hunchback of Notre Dame (Judge Claude Frollo (Tony Jay))
- The Lord of the Rings: The Fellowship of the Ring (Gandalf the Grey (Ian McKellen))
- The Lord of the Rings: The Two Towers (Gandalf the White (Ian McKellen))
- The Lord of the Rings: The Return of the King (Gandalf the White (Ian McKellen))
- The Golden Compass (Iorek Byrnison (Ian McKellen))
- The Hobbit: An Unexpected Journey (Gandalf the Grey (Ian McKellen))
- The Hobbit: The Desolation of Smaug (Gandalf the Grey (Ian McKellen))
- The Hobbit: The Battle of the Five Armies (Gandalf the Grey (Ian McKellen))
