= Lunettes of Trois-Châtels and Tousey =

Coordinates: 47°13′23″N 6°02′05″E

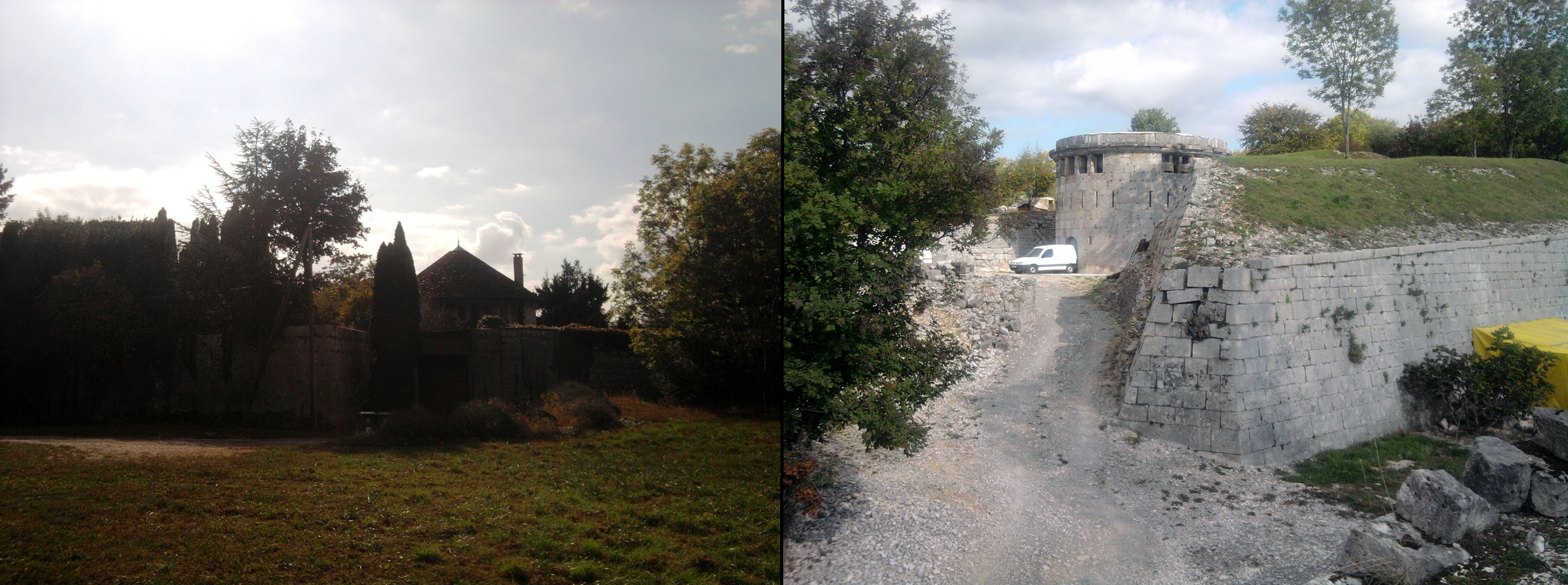
The two lunettes.

The lunettes of Trois-Châtels and Tousey are two lunettes located in the French city of Besançon. Their foundations were constructed in 1792 to support the citadel of Vauban but the structure was badly built and they were rebuilt during the Bourbon Restoration. In World War II, American forces liberated the city after a few battles in the two fortifications to reach the citadel. In the 1990s, they were bought by a man who now lives in the lunette of Tousey. Trois-Châtels has been an official historical monument of France since 1995.
