= Paul Féval, père =

French novelist and dramatist

Paul Féval
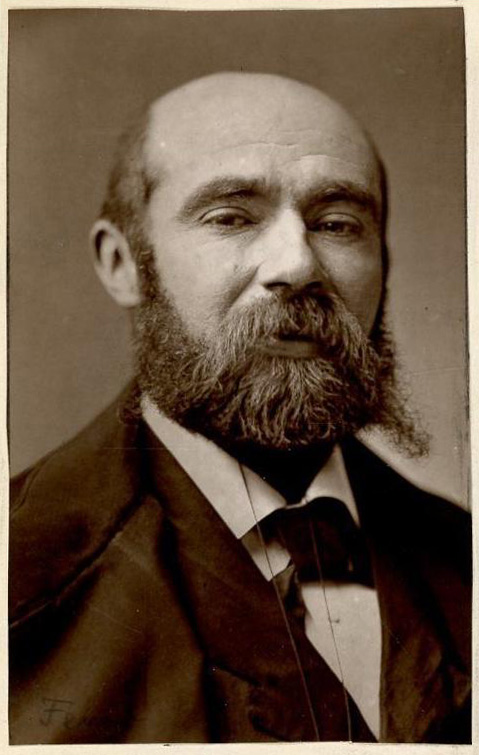
- Born: Paul Henri Corentin Féval; 29 September 1816; Rennes, France
- Died: 8 March 1887 (aged 70); Paris, France
- Occupations: Novelist, dramatist
- Children: 8, including Paul Féval, fils
- Writing career
- Genres: Historical fiction, crime fiction, fantastic fiction

Paul Henri Corentin Féval, père (29 September 1816 - 8 March 1887) was a French novelist and dramatist.

He was the author of popular swashbuckler novels such as Le Loup blanc (1843) and the perennial best-seller Le Bossu (1857). He also penned the seminal vampire fiction novels Le Chevalier Ténèbre (1860), La Vampire (1865) and La Ville Vampire (1874) and wrote several celebrated novels about his native Brittany and Mont Saint-Michel such as La Fée des Grèves (1850).

Féval's greatest claim to fame, however, is as one of the fathers of modern crime fiction. Because of its themes and characters, his novel Jean Diable (1862) can claim to be the world's first modern novel of detective fiction. His masterpiece was Les Habits Noirs (1863–1875), a criminal saga comprising seven novels.

After losing his fortune in a financial scandal, Féval became a born-again Christian, stopped writing crime thrillers, and began to write religious novels, leaving the tale of the Habits Noirs uncompleted.

== Life ==
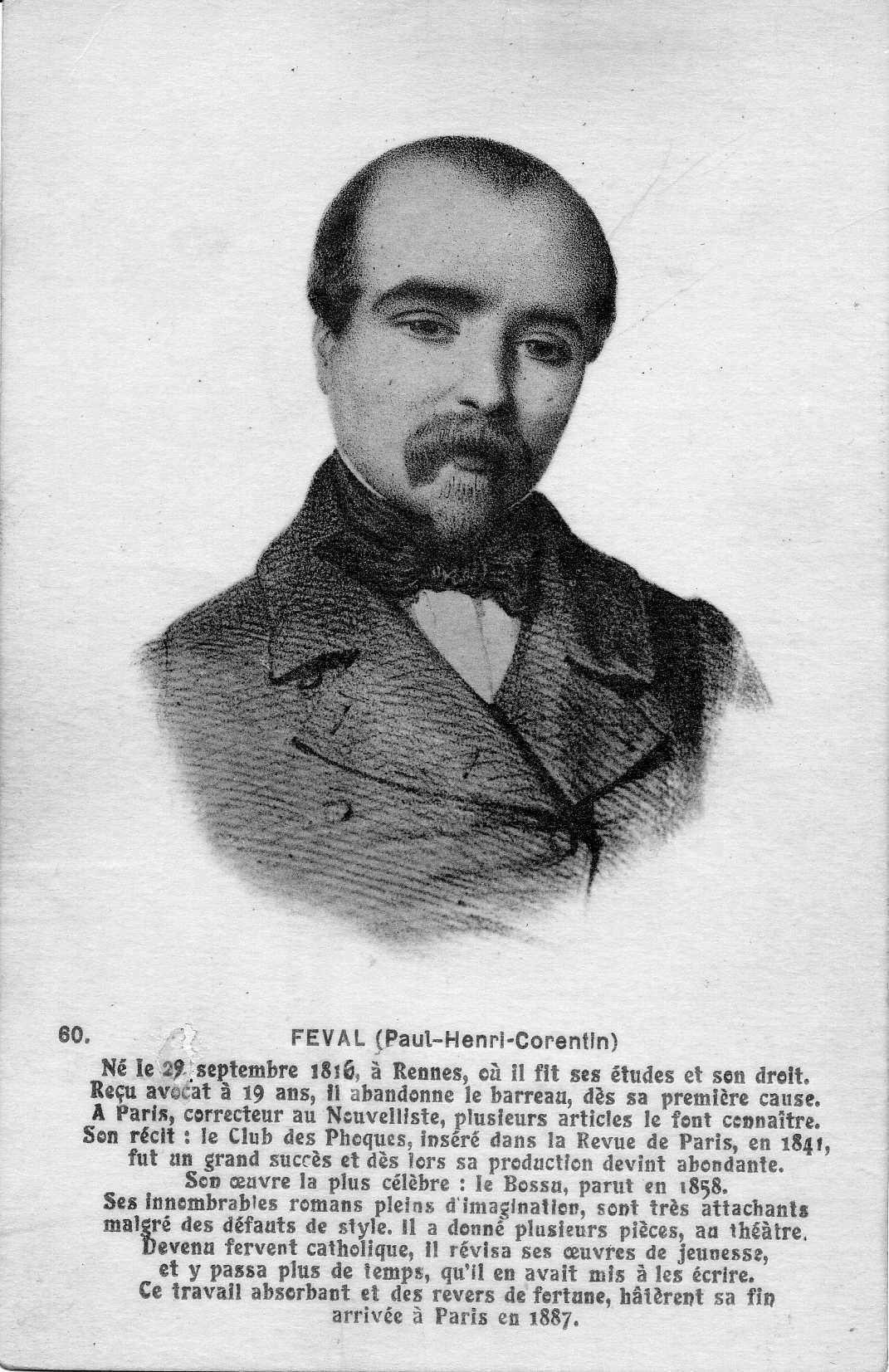
Paul Féval, postcard F. Château

Paul Henri Corentin Féval was born at the Hôtel de Blossac in Rennes in Brittany on 29 September 1816. A number of his novels deal with the history of his native province. He was educated for the bar and became a full-fledged lawyer in 1836. However, he soon moved to Paris, where he gained a footing by the publication of his novel Le Club des phoques (1841) in the Revue de Paris. It was soon followed by two more swashbucklers: Rollan Pied de Fer (1842), Les Chevaliers du Firmament and Le Loup Blanc (both 1843). The latter novel features a heroic albino who fights for justice in a Zorro-like disguise, one of the earliest treatments of a crimefighter with a secret identity.

Féval's break came with the Les Mystères de Londres (1844), a sprawling feuilleton written to cash in on the success of Eugène Sue's Les Mystères de Paris. In it, Irishman Fergus O'Breane tries to avenge the wrongs of his countrymen by seeking the annihilation of England. The plot anticipates that of Alexandre Dumas, père's The Count of Monte Cristo by one year. The novel also features a Mafia-like criminal secret society called the Gentlemen of the Night, a theme that will become recurrent in Féval's oeuvre. Féval published the series under the pseudonym Sir Francis Trollop.

With Les Mystères de Londres, Féval became the equal of Dumas and Sue in the eyes of his contemporaries. However, he was unhappy about his success as the author of adventure novels and soon tried to gain literary recognition with social satires such as Le Tueur de Tigres (1853), but in vain. He returned to popular literature with more swashbucklers such as La Louve (1855) (a sequel to his earlier Le Loup Blanc) and L'Homme de Fer (1856).

His biggest success in the genre was Le Bossu (1857) in which a prodigious swordsman, Henri de Lagardère, disguises himself as a hunchback to avenge his friend the Duke de Nevers, murdered by the villainous Prince de Gonzague. It features the famous motto: "If you don't come to Lagardère, Lagardère will come to you." Le Bossu has been the subject of half-a-dozen feature film adaptations and a number of sequels, written by Féval's son.

That same year, with Les Compagnons du Silence, Féval returned to the theme of criminal conspiracies. It was followed by Jean Diable (1862), arguably the first modern crime thriller. In it, Scotland Yard Chief Superintendent Gregory Temple is mystified by the actions of a supremely gifted crime leader who hides behind the identity of John Devil.

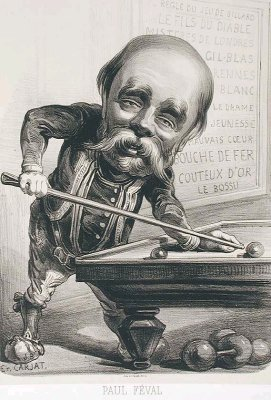
1862 lithographic caricature of Paul Féval by Étienne Carjat

In 1862, Féval founded the magazine Jean Diable, named after his eponymous novel. One of its editors was Émile Gaboriau, future creator of the police detective Monsieur Lecoq, a hero seemingly unrelated to the villainous Lecoq of the Habits Noirs first introduced by Féval. Gaboriau's Lecoq later influenced Conan Doyle's creation of Sherlock Holmes.

In 1863, Féval embarked on his masterpiece, Les Habits Noirs, a sprawling criminal saga written over a twelve-year period, comprising seven novels. He retroactively incorporated Les Mystères de Londres, Les Compagnons du Silence (itself a sequel to an earlier work, Bel Demonio (1850)) and Jean Diable into the chronology of Les Habits Noirs, creating a veritable human comedy of evil and secret conspiracies. By its methods, themes and characters, Les Habits Noirs is the precursor of today's conspiracy and organized crime novels. Féval's heroes, from Gregory Temple, the first detective, to Remy d'Arx, the investigative magistrate who pursues the Habits Noirs, are also the first modern heroes of their kind.

In 1865, Féval became President of the Société des Gens de Lettre (Society of Authors), a position he kept until 1868. He was President again from 1874 to 1876.

In 1865, Féval also wrote La Vampire, a seminal text featuring the perversely charismatic Countess Addhema, the first and foremost prototype of the female vampire-as-libido-run-wild theme. Some scholars claimed the text was initially penned in 1856, over 40 years before Bram Stoker's Dracula.

Féval returned to the theme of vampirism with La Ville Vampire (1867) in which the protagonist is Gothic novel writer Ann Radcliffe herself. In it, to save her friends from the dreaded vampire lord Otto Goetzi, Radcliffe and her fearless vampire hunting companions, Merry Bones the Irishman, Grey Jack the faithful old servant, the revenge-driven Doctor Magnus Szegeli, and Polly Bird, one of the vampire's earlier victims, mount an expedition to find the legendary vampire city of Selene.

In 1873 and 1875, Féval tried to join the Académie française but was rejected, because of the popular nature of his works, but also because of his political convictions.

In 1875, a few months after finishing La Bande Cadet, the seventh volume in the Habits Noirs series, Féval lost nearly all his fortune–the staggering sum of 800,000 francs–several million dollars by today's reckoning–in a financial scandal linked to the Ottoman Empire. As a result, he became what today would be called a born-again Christian, and stopped writing crime novels, which he then considered sinful. In fact, he reclaimed the rights to his earlier books and tried to rewrite them to better conform to his new principles. He also began writing religious-themed novels such as La Première Aventure de Corentin Quimper (1876) and Pierre Blot (1877).

In 1882, Paul Féval was again ruined, the victim of an embezzler. He became paralyzed and unable to write. In April 1884, he suffered another blow when he lost his wife. He was taken to the hospice of the Brothers of Saint-Jean de Dieu where he died on 8 March 1887.

His son, Paul Féval (1860–1933) also became a prolific writer.

== Sources ==
- Author and Book info.com
