= Pierre-Jean de Béranger =

French poet and chansonnier (1780–1857)

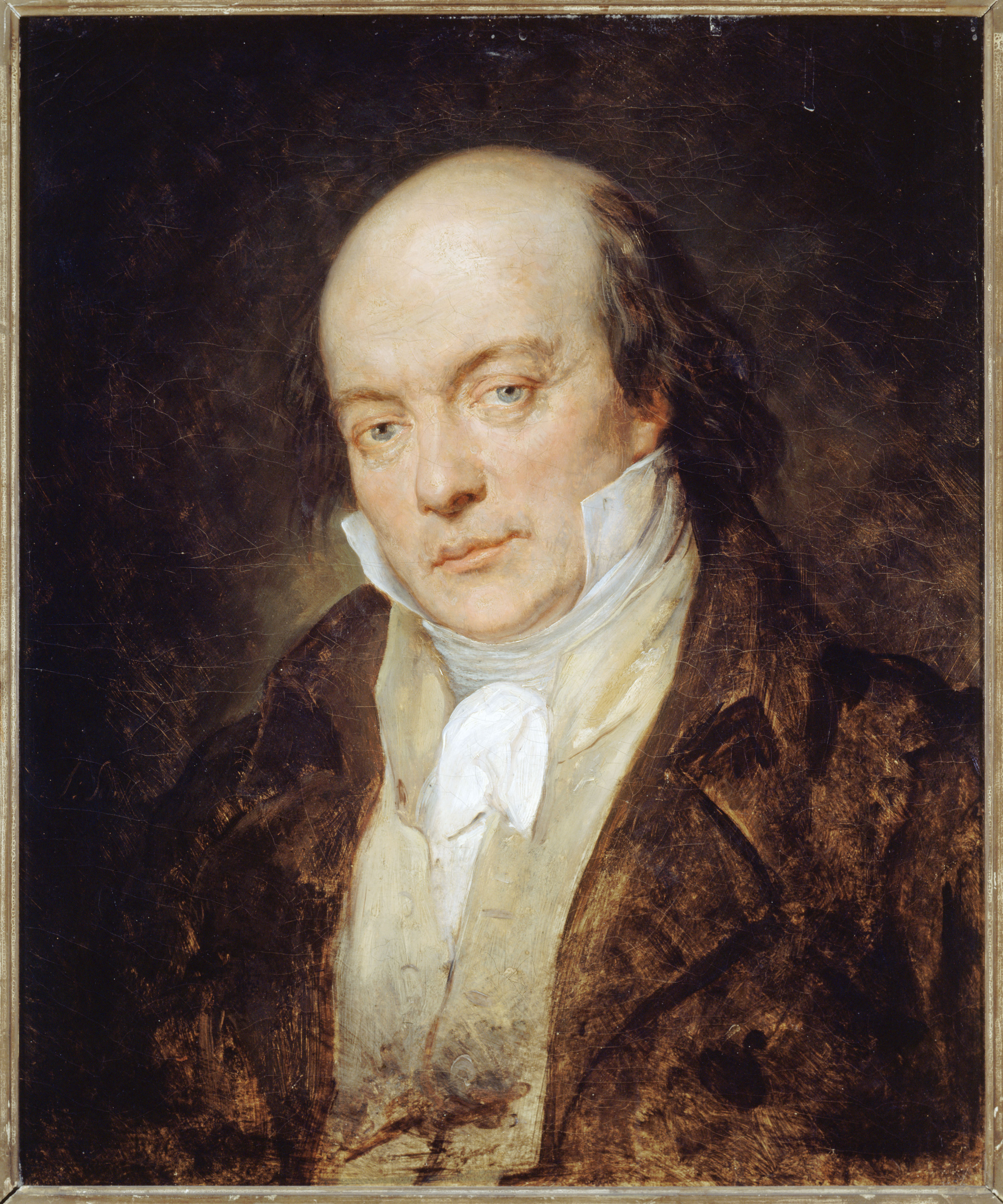
- Pierre-Jean de Béranger
- Born: Pierre-Jean de Béranger; 19 August 1780
- Died: 16 July 1857 (aged 76)

Pierre-Jean de Béranger (French pronunciation: [pjɛʁ ʒɑ̃ də beʁɑ̃ʒe]; 19 August 1780 – 16 July 1857) was a prolific French poet and chansonnier (songwriter), who enjoyed great popularity and influence in France during his lifetime, but faded into obscurity in the decades following his death. He has been described as "the most popular French songwriter of all time" and "the first superstar of French popular music".

== Early life and career, 1780–1803 ==
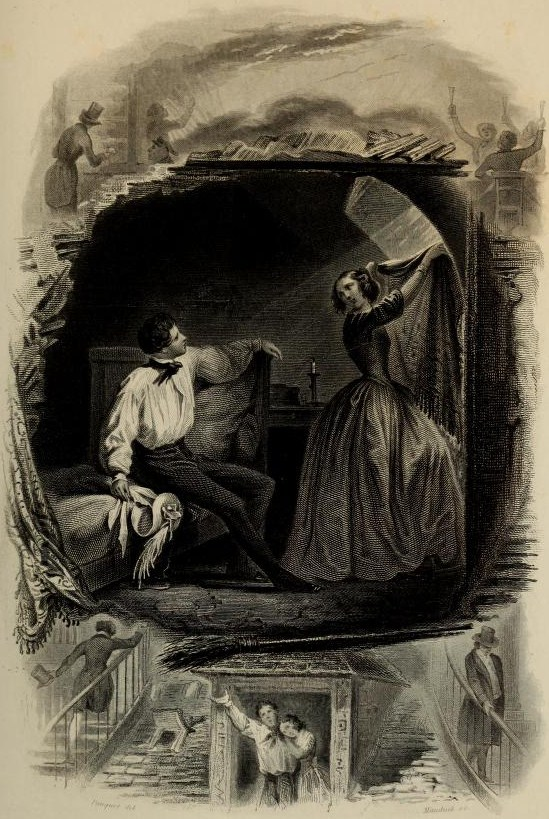
Le Grenier (The Garret - illustration to Béranger's poem of the same name)

Béranger was born at his grandfather's house on the Rue Montorgueil in Paris, which he later described as "one of the dirtiest and most turbulent streets of Paris". He was not actually of noble blood, despite the use of an appended "de" in the family name by his father, who had vainly assumed the name of Béranger de Mersix. He was, in fact, descended from more humble stock, a country innkeeper on one side of the family and a tailor on the other—the latter was later celebrated in a song, "Le tailleur et la fée" (The tailor and the fairy). He made much of his humble origins in "Le Villain" (The Plebeian):

« Moi, noble ? oh ! vraiment, messieurs, non.
Non, d'aucune chevalerie
Je n'ai le brevet sur vélin.
Je ne sais qu'aimer ma patrie... (bis.)
Je suis vilain et très-vilain... (bis.)
Je suis vilain,
Vilain, vilain. »

"I noble? no, sirs, I confess.
No—none, for me, of knightly race
The patent did on vellum trace;
To love my country's all I know…(twice.)
I'm of a breed that's low indeed…(twice.)
Yes, low, sirs, very low!"

As a child he was shy and sickly, but skilful with his hands and learnt to carve cherry stones. He was sent to school in the faubourg St. Antoine, and from its roof witnessed the storming of the Bastille in 1789, which was commemorated in his poem, "Le quatorze juillet" (The 14th of July). His father had been a business agent, but his royalist sympathies meant that he had to go into hiding after the French Revolution. Pierre-Jean was therefore sent to live with an aunt in Péronne, in Somme, who ran an auberge (boarding house). His aunt apparently taught him republican principles, and from her doorstep he heard the guns at Valenciennes (during the War of the First Coalition); he also developed a passionate love of France and distaste for all things foreign.

He attended a school in Péronne, L'Institut Patriotique, founded by M. Ballue de Bellenglise, one time deputy of the legislative assembly, which was run according to the educational principles of Jean-Jacques Rousseau. Here, the boys were organised into clubs and regiments, and taught to play at politics and war. Béranger was president of the club, made speeches before such members of the National Convention as passed through Péronne, and composed addresses to Jean Lambert Tallien and Robespierre.

Neither Greek nor Latin was taught at his school—nor even French language by all accounts, for it was only after he left school that he acquired the elements of grammar from a printer, in Péronne, called Lainez, with whom he served an apprenticeship from the age of 14 years of age (after a spell as a waiter, for his aunt). It was there that he acquired a taste for verse. Although he could never read Horace in the original, he had an acquaintance with Fénelon's Télémaque, Racine and the dramas of Voltaire.

After spending some time in Laisnez's printing-office, he was called to Paris, in 1796, to serve as an assistant in his father's business. In 1798, the firm went bankrupt, and Beranger found himself in straitened circumstances, though he now had more time to compose verse. Poems such as "Le Grenier" (The Garret) and "Mon Habit" (My Coat) belong to this period. He did literary hackwork, and wrote pastorals, epics and other works. However, by the end of 1803, Béranger was in direst poverty and poor health. His wardrobe consisted of one pair of boots, one greatcoat, one pair of trousers with a hole in the knee, and "three bad shirts which a friendly hand wearied itself in endeavouring to mend." The friendly hand was that of Judith Frere, whom he had known since 1796, and who continued to be his faithful companion until her death, three months before his own. She was not the Lisette referred to in his songs, but was the inspiration behind La Bonne Vieille and Maudit printemps.

=== Success, 1804–1821 ===
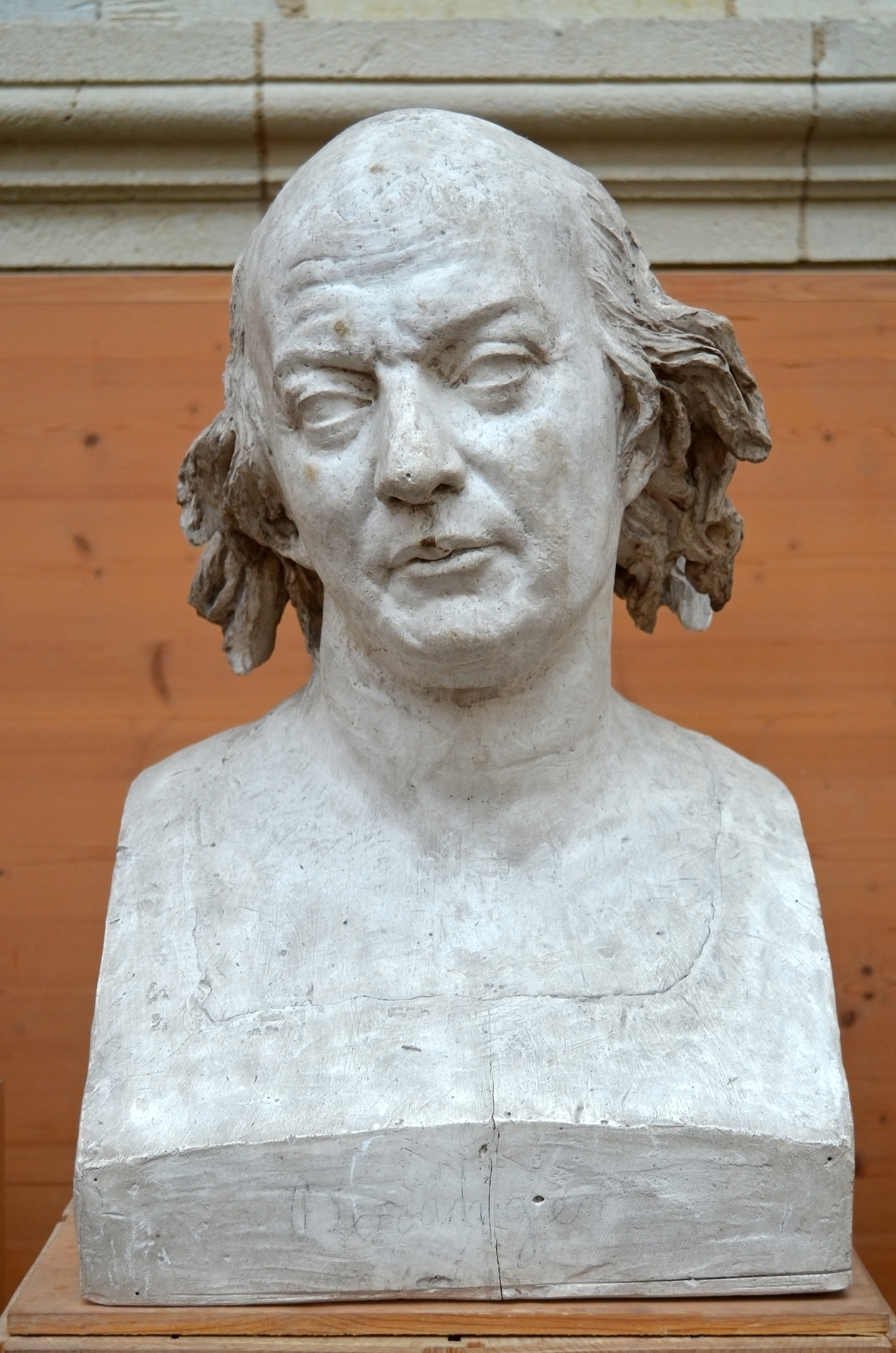
Bust of Pierre-Jean de Béranger by David d'Angers (1829).

Out of desperation Beranger wrote a letter to Lucien Bonaparte, brother of Napoleon, enclosing some of his work. Lucien Bonaparte took an interest in the young poet, even transferring to him his own pension of 1000 francs from the Institut de France, and persuaded him to write a poem on the Death of Nero. Five years later, in 1809, through the same patronage, but indirectly, he became a despatch clerk at the Imperial University of France, at a salary of an additional thousand francs. Now his life began to take on a more regular shape.

Meanwhile, he had written many songs for convivial occasions, and "to console himself under all misfortunes"; some had apparently already been published by his father, but he set no great store on them himself; and it was only in 1812, while keeping a sick friend company, that it occurred to him to write down the best of them. The following year he was elected to the Caveau Moderne, and his reputation as a songwriter began to spread. Manuscript copies of Les Gueux, Le petit homme gris, Le Sénateur, and, above all, of Le Roi d'Yvetot, a satire against Napoleon, passed from hand to hand, were spoken and sung, achieving both popularity and acclaim. Around this time, also, he made the acquaintance of the well-known songwriter, Désaugiers.

The disastrous events of the Napoleonic Wars, with the invasion of France by allied armies, the surrender of Paris in 1814, and, finally, the defeat at Waterloo in 1815, had a deep effect on Béranger, and gave a new stimulus and direction to his poetic output. After the restoration of the Bourbon monarchy, he turned his pen against the establishment, opposing the antinationalist tendencies of the government, revolting against the absurdities of the day and celebrating the former glories of the republic. He became the national poet of France.

Béranger's first volume of poetry ("Chansons morales et autres") appeared in 1815, and though it contained few political pieces, it aroused the suspicion of the department in which he worked due to its popularity; he was advised by his chief not to publish any similar material in the future. The advice went unheeded and Béranger issued another volume in 1821, by which time he had resigned from his regular employment.

=== Imprisonment ===
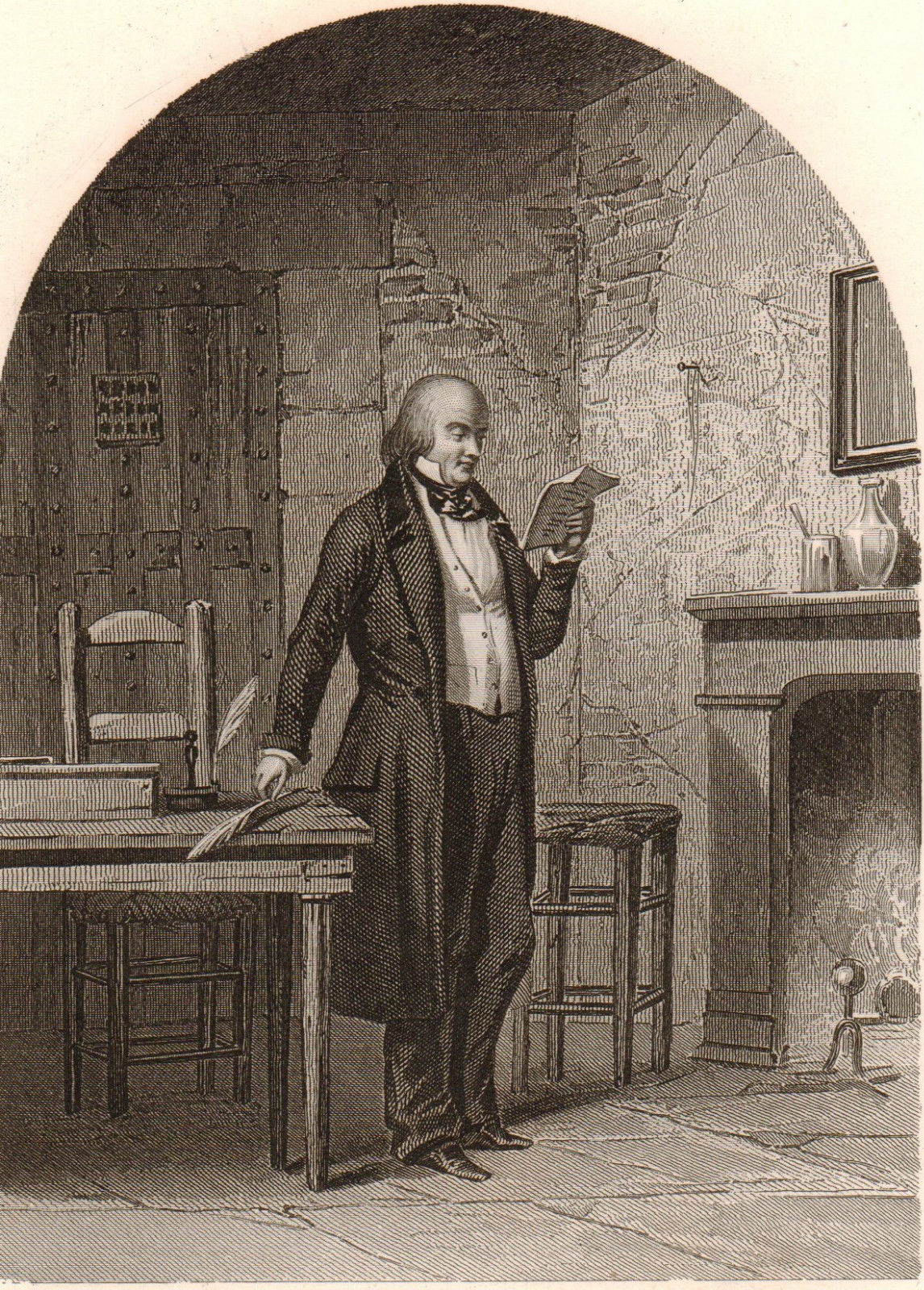
Béranger in La Force Prison, 1828.

The second volume of songs enjoyed huge sales, but also attracted judicial proceedings; Béranger's subsequent trial and conviction resulted in a fine of 500 francs and 3 months in Sainte-Pélagie Prison, though, from all accounts, his accommodation "inside" was actually more comfortable than the poor lodgings he had previously had to suffer on the "outside". Even in jail he continued to compose, producing songs such as, "Les Adieu à la Campagne," "La Chasse," "L'Agent Provocateur," and "Mon Carnaval".

Béranger's third collection went unpunished, but his 4th volume, published in 1828, was severely dealt with, the author being fined 1,100 francs and sentenced to nine months in La Force Prison. This was after the government had offered him a minimal penalty if he would offer no defence to the charges; Béranger, of course, refused the offer, not even asking for the option of passing his term in a Maison de santé, the French equivalent of an English madhouse.

=== The height of his career ===
This was the most brilliant period of Béranger's career. He had influence among the opposition to the government; his advice was sought for and respected; his even-handedness, his love of freedom of speech, courtesy, lack of personal ambition, generous disposition, and marked sympathy for the young, all endeared him to the nation, and especially to the common people. A volume of his song lyrics was published in 1836, Oeuvres complètes de Béranger, illustrated with 100 wood engravings by the French illustrator J. J. Grandville.

His songs (such as Le Vieux Drapeau), helped to bring about the revolution of 1830, and he played a part, with his friends Lafitte and Lafayette, in placing Louis Philippe I upon the throne, but refused all the appointments proffered by the king and his ministers; he simply desired to live as a philosopher, content with the income from the sale of his songs, and preserving his personal independence. He did, however, ask for a pension for his friend, Rouget de Lisle, author of the Marseillaise, who was now old and poor, and had been dependent on him for five years. In 1833, his 5th volume of songs was published

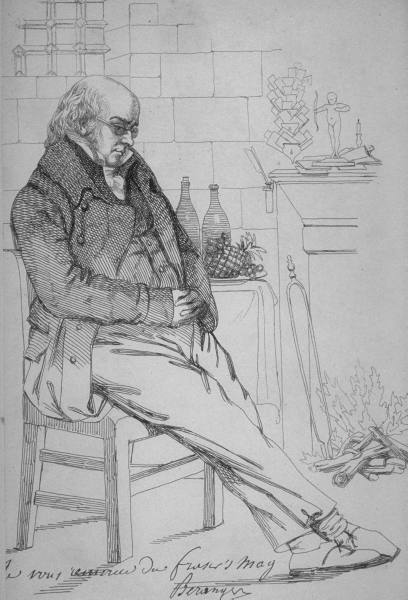
Pen and ink sketch of Bérenger from Fraser's (magazine), ca. 1833.

After the French Revolution of 1848, and despite his own reluctance, he was elected to the Constituent Assembly by so large a number of votes (204,471) that he felt himself obliged to accept the seat. Not long afterwards, with great difficulty, he obtained leave to resign. This was the last public event of Béranger's life.

=== Retirement ===
Béranger tried to live as quietly and privately as possible in retirement. He continued to polish his songs and had many illustrious visitors. He numbered among his friends Chateaubriand, Adolphe Thiers, Jacques Laffitte, Jules Michelet, Lamennais, Mignet. He was said to be amiable in character, ready to receive help when in need, but also ready to give help when needed by others. His correspondence is noted for its wisdom and kindness, reminiscent of Montaigne, and, occasionally, Charles Lamb.

It was in this period that he became a champion of the struggling artist Antoine Chintreuil, buying his work, paying for his supplies, and writing many letters of recommendation to collectors and connoisseurs.

He produced a book of memoirs, which was translated into English, and started work on a treatise, Social and Political Morality, which was left unfinished on his death. During his final illness, the street in which he lived was thronged with sympathisers and his death was an occasion for national sorrow and mourning. It was feared that the funeral would be the signal for some political disturbance; but the government took immediate measures, and all went quietly. The streets of Paris were lined with soldiers and full of townsfolk, silent and uncovered. From time to time cries arose: "Honneur, honneur a Béranger!"

== Songs ==
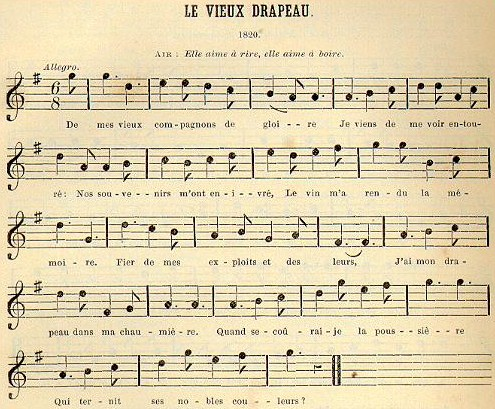
Music and first verse of "Le Vieux drapeau" ("The old flag", 1820)

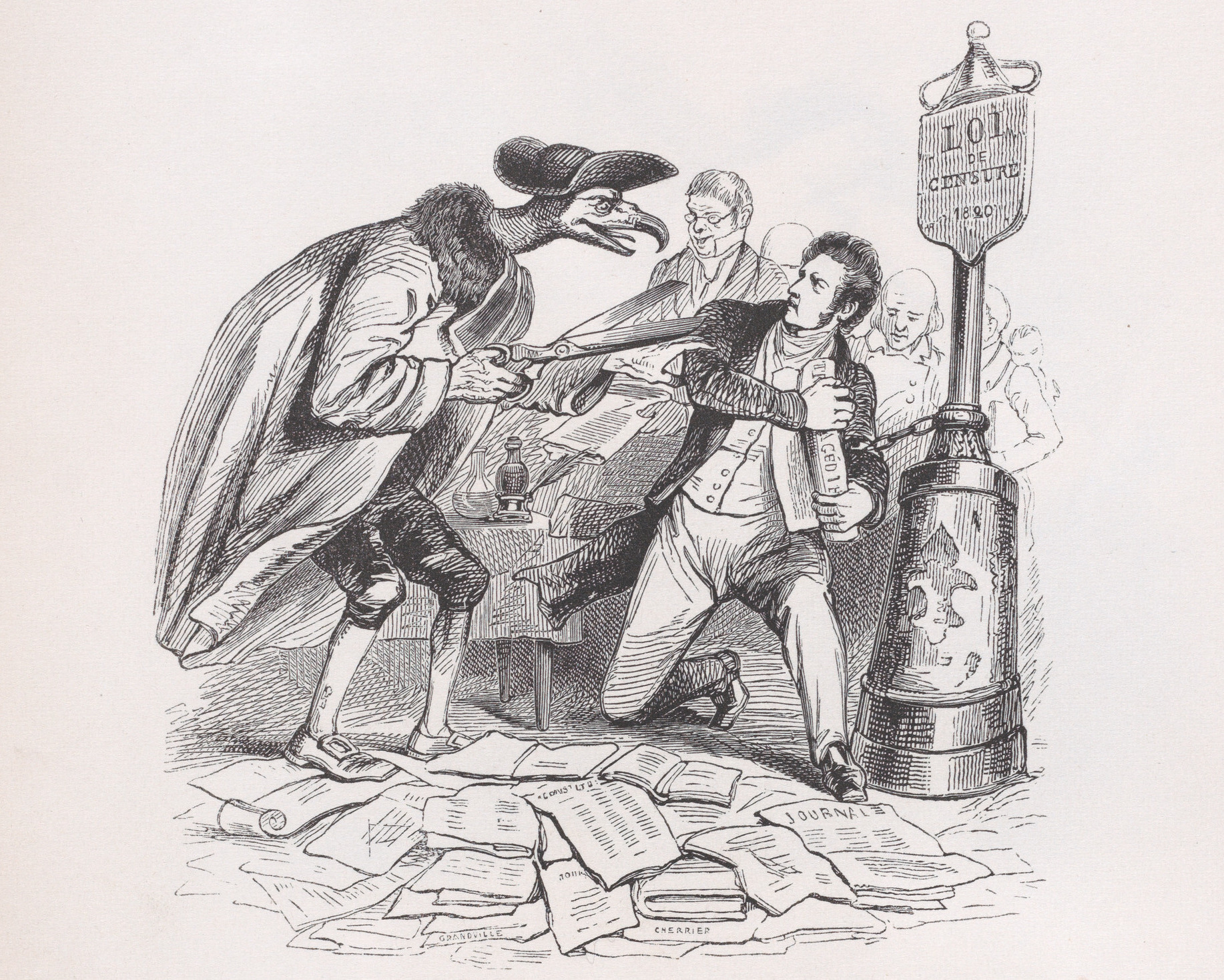
Illustration for the song, The Censor by J. J. Grandville (1836), wood engraving, 21.9 x 14 cm., Metropolitan Museum of Art.

Béranger has been described as "the most popular French songwriter of all time", and it is certainly true that, in the 19th century, no nation had a lyricist whose influence on his fellow countrymen compared to that exercised by Béranger on the citizens of Paris. Like all chansonniers, he wrote lyrics but did not compose any music; he set the words to a pre-existing melody such as a folk tune. "Le Roi d'Yvetot", for example, was sung to the traditional air "Quand un tendron vient en ces lieux", while others might be set to well-known melodies by various composers.

"I am a good little bit of a poet," Béranger said of himself, "clever in the craft, and a conscientious worker to whom old airs and a modest choice of subjects (le coin que me suis confine) have brought some success." His modest self-appraisal belies his importance in literary history. When he first began to cultivate the chanson, it was a minor and little-regarded form, restricted to slight subjects and a humorous guise of treatment. Béranger raised the standing of the art and imbued it with greater sentiment.

From early in his career, Béranger set out to write songs for ordinary people. He was helped in this by Emile Debraux, who often acted as an intermediary between him and a popular audience and shaped his sense of popular humour. Having noticed a prevailing tone of sadness in the songs of sailors and workers, he increasingly turned, as his skill developed, to the serious and lasting concerns of ordinary people. The change was gradual, and his work shows every stage, from the witty detachment of fifty pieces in his first collection to the serious and even tragic tone of Les Souvenirs du peuple and Le Vieux Vagabond. This change was accompanied by another, which anticipated the Romantic movement.

For the chanson, as he says himself, opened up to him a path in which his genius could develop itself at ease; he escaped, by this literary gateway, from strict academical requirements, and had at his disposal the whole dictionary, four-fifths of which, according to La Harpe, were forbidden to the use of more regular and pretentious poetry. If he still kept some of the old vocabulary, some of the old imagery, he was yet accustoming people to hear moving subjects treated in a manner more free and simple than before; so that his was a sort of conservative reform, preceding the violent revolution of Victor Hugo and his army of uncompromising romantics. He seems himself to have had glimmerings of some such idea; but he withheld his full approval from the new movement on two grounds: first, because the romantic school misused somewhat brutally the delicate organism of the French language; and second, as he wrote to Sainte-Beuve in 1832, because they adopted the slogan of "Art for art," and set no object of public usefulness before them as they wrote. For himself (and this is the third point of importance) he had a strong sense of political responsibility. Public interest took a far higher place in his estimation than any private passion or favour. He had little toleration for those erotic poets who sing their own loves and not the common sorrows of mankind, who forget, to quote his own words, "forget beside their mistress those who labour before the Lord." Hence it is that so many of his pieces are political, and so many, in the later times at least, inspired with a socialistic spirit of indignation and revolt. It is by this socialism that he becomes truly modern. and touches hands with Burns.

In Émile Gaboriau's novel Monsieur Lecoq (Mister Rooster), published in 1868, Monsieur Lecoq finds that a prisoner is communicating with his confederate using a cipher based on Béranger's poetry. It is noteworthy that in constructing the book's plot, Gaboriau found it plausible to depict The songs of Béranger as the only book possessed by the prisoner.

== See also ==
- Jacques-Antoine Manuel
- Goguette
- Veranzerou Street, a street in Athens, Greece, a Hellenized naming in his honor, originally called Hospital Street (Odos Nosokomeiou)

== Selected recordings ==
- Le Pape musulman & autres chansons: Arnaud Marzorati, Yves Rechsteiner, Freddy Eichelberger. Alpha.

== Portraits ==
- Ary Scheffer, oil on canvas, ca. 1830, Musée de la Vie romantique, Hôtel Scheffer-Renan, Paris.
- David d'Angers, profile, medallion.
- David d'Angers, bust in plaster.

== Bibliography ==
Biography and essays:

- Edwards, Amelia. Béranger and his poetry (article from "The ladies' companion", pub. Bradbury and Evans, 1855, Vol. VIII, 2nd series) pp. 119–122.
- De Béranger. Ma biographie (Paris: Perrotin,1858). French text.
- De Béranger. Memoirs of Béranger (London: Hurst & Blackett, 1858). English translation.
- Boiteau, Dieudonné A. P. Correspondance de Béranger (Letters of Beranger): Volume 1, Volume 2, Volume 3, Volume 4 (Paris: Garnier, 1860).
- Coquelin, Constant. Béranger, un poete national (Paris: Paul Ollendorff, 1884). French text.
- Causeret, Charles. Béranger (Paris: Lecène et Oudin, 1895).
- Henriet, Frédéric. "Chintreuil" in l'Artiste, October 24, 1858; reprinted as a monograph, Esquisse biographique, Chintreuil, Paris: J. Claye, 1858.*Mansion, J. E. (Jean Edmond). Chansons choisies de Béranger (Selected songs of Berenger) (Oxford: Clarendon Press, 1908). Includes detailed autobiography. French.
- Touchard, Jean. La Gloire de Béranger (A. Colin, 1968). French text.
- Rieger, Dietmar. La chanson française et son histoire (Gunter Narr Verlag, 1988) p. 103 ff.
- Portis, Larry. French Frenzies: A Social History of Pop Music in France (Virtualbookworm Publishing, 2004) p. 11 ff.

Songbooks:

- Oeuvres complètes de P.-J. de Béranger (Paris : Perrotin, 1847). French text:

Volume 1. Lyrics.
Volume 2. Lyrics.
Volume 3. Melodies of the songs.
Volume 4
Volume 5. Autobiography of Béranger.

- Young, William. One hundred songs of Pierre-Jean de Béranger (London: Chapman and Hall, 1847). English and French text.
- Young, William. Béranger: two hundred of his lyrical poems (G.P. Putnam, 1850). Includes biography. English.
- Brough, Robert B (trans.). Béranger's songs of the empire, the peace, and the restoration (Addey and co., 1856). In English.
- Toynbee William (trans.). Songs of Béranger (London & New York: W. Scott, ltd., 1892). In English.
