= Joaquina García Balmaseda =

Spanish actress (1837–1911)

Joaquina García Balmaseda de González (February 17, 1837 – April 12, 1911) was a Spanish actress, journalist, poet, humorist, and translator.

== Early life and education ==
Joaquina García Balmaseda was born in Madrid in 1837. Her parents, Dámaso García Fernández and Francisca Balmaseda Olivares, were of modest means. She studied declamation at the Madrid Royal Conservatory, then spent four years as an actress in the company of Joaquín Arjona.

== Career ==
García Balmaseda's literary career began in 1860, when she was 23 years old. Across her career, she wrote three plays, three books of advice for women, a book for young women subtitled Tratado de las labores frivolité y malla, three books of poetry, an instructional book for young readers, and various journalistic articles. She also produced many translations, some of which were offered "as a gift" to subscribers to La Correspondencia de España.

García Balmaseda's writing on women's education and labor were widely read, including her best-known work, La madre de familia. Her book Diálogos instructivos sobre la religión, la moral y las maravillas de la naturaleza, first published 1860, was printed in its 12th edition by 1919, and it was declared official reading among primary school students.

=== Journalism ===
Her career as a journalist began in 1957, when she started writing for the publications Educación Pintoresca and Barcelona's La Floresta. From there, she wrote for numerous magazines and newspapers over more than 35 years. For La Correspondencia de España, she translated many novellas from French, Italian, and English. In 1864, she began producing literary criticism for the publication, and she also wrote fashion dispatches. She also wrote for El Museo de las Familias (1861), La Aurora de la Vida (1861), La América (1861 and 1867), La Educanda (1862–1865), El Museo Literario (1863–1866), and La Violeta (1864). She worked frequently as an editor, and employed various pseudonyms, including Baronesa de Olivares, Aurora Pérez de Mirón, Adela Samb, and Condesa de Valflores.

In October 1883, at age 56, she was named the director of the magazine El Correo de la Moda, succeeding Ángela Grassi; she would lead the newspaper for a decade, until 1893. Her fashion column for the magazine, "Revista de Modas," ran for more than 20 years, from 1866 to 1886.

She frequently addressed women's issues, defending women's role in the arts and in society at large in her article "La mujer artista." While García Balmaseda was immersed in the prevailing neo-Catholic conservatism of Isabella II's reign, she made important strides in the area of women's education and in ensuring the well-being, independence, and freedom of single women.

=== Theater ===
García Balmaseda also had an interest in the theater, stemming from her youth as an actress. She detailed the medium's history from its Greek roots to its modern form in Spain in her essay "La actriz española." She also wrote three plays, beginning with Genio y figura at only 24 years old. These works developed the theme of antagonism between the sexes and women's fight for independence while still desiring love.

== Personal life and death ==
After many years as a defiantly single woman, Joaquina García Balmaseda married the military officer Eustaquio González Marcos in 1883, when she was 46 years old. She remained active in her journalistic career after her marriage. In 1907, she was widowed, and published the poetry collection Ecos de otra edad in honor of her late husband.

She died in 1911, at age 74. While some sources place her death in 1893, this is due to confusion with the death date of her mother.

== Selected works ==
=== Theater ===
- Genio y figura, Madrid, Imprenta de José Rodríguez, 1861.
- Donde las dan..., Madrid, Establecimiento tipográfico de Eduardo Cuesta, 1868.
- Un pájaro en el garlito, Madrid, Imprenta de José Rodríguez, 1871.

=== Poetry ===
- Entre el cielo y la tierra, 1868, with a prologue by Manuel Cañete.
- Ecos de otra edad, Madrid, Ducazcal, 1907.

=== Translations for La Correspondencia de España ===
- La dicha de ser rico, by Hendrik Conscience
- El Crimen de Orcival, El dinero de los otros, El legajo núm. 113, El proceso Lerouge, La canalla dorada, Los esclavos de Paris, and Los secretos de la casa Champdoce, by Émile Gaboriau
- Amada, El caballero Fortuna, El paraíso de las mujeres, and El pretil de aventureros, by Paul Feval
- Dos madres, El conde de Coulange, La encantadora, and La hija maldecida, by Jules Émile Richebourg
- Cesarina Dietrich, El marqués de Villemer, and Flamarandre, by George Sand
- El coche número 13, El médico de las locas, and El secreto de la Condesa, by Xavier de Montépin
- La hada de Auteuil, Los amores de Aurora, and Los misterios de una raza, by Pierre Alexis Ponson du Terrail
- La muerta viva, Marido y mujer, and Pobre Lucila, by Wilkie Collins
- Cecilia and Creación y redención by Alexandre Dumas
- Diario de una mujer by Octave Feuillet
- Dos miserias by Émile Souvestre
- El abismo, by Charles Dickens
- El beso de la Condesa Sabina, by Antonio Caccianiga
- El caballero de Pampelonne, by Henri Ange Aristide de Gondrecourt
- El capitán del buitre, by Mary Elizabeth Braddon
- El padre de Marcial, by Albert Delpit
- El prometido de Simona, by Victor Cherbuliez
- El renegado, by Jules Claretie
- El vampiro de Valdegracia, by Léon Gozlan
- Fremont joven y Risler mayor, by Alphonse Daudet
- La novia, by Emmanuel González
- Los amores de una gran señora, by Alfred de Bréhat
- Los malvados, by Fortuné du Boisgobey
- Madama Frainex, by Robert Halt
- Santiago Broneau, by Madame de Clesinger
- Sergio Panine by Georges Ohnet
- Un estreno en la Opera, by Ernest-Aimé Feydeau
- Un hogar en Akesta, by Émile Gaboriau

=== Essays ===
- "Lo que toda mujer debe saber" (1877), in La mujer en los discursos de género: textos y contextos en el siglo xix, Catherine Jagoe, Alda Blanco, and Cristina Enríquez de Salamanca, eds., Madrid, Icaria, 1995, pp. 95–99.
- "La actriz española" (1881), in Faustina Sáez de Melgar (editor), Las mujeres españolas, americanas y lusitanas pintadas por sí mismas, Alicante, Biblioteca Virtual «Miguel de Cervantes», 2006.

=== Other ===
- La madre de familia: diálogos instructivos sobre la religión, la moral y las maravillas de la naturaleza, Madrid: D. A. Santa Coloma, 1860.
- Tratado de las labores frivolité y malla.

== Bibliography ==
- Ermanno Caldera, "La perspectiva femenina en el teatro de Joaquina Balmaseda y Enriqueta Lozano", in VV. AA. Escritoras románticas españolas, Madrid: Fundación Banco Exterior, 1990, pp. 207–216.
- Andrea Smith, "Joaquina García Balmaseda: desconocida dramaturga decimonónica", in Stichomythia 8 (2009): 30–42.
- Alda Blanco, "Teóricas de la conciencia feminista", in La mujer en los discursos de género: textos y contextos en el siglo x i x, Catherine Jagoe, Alda Blanco y Cristina Enríquez de Salamanca, eds., Madrid, Icaria, 1995, pp. 445–472.
- David Gies, "Mujer y dramaturga: conflicto y resolución en el teatro español del siglo x i x," in Del romanticismo al realismo. Actas del I coloquio de la Sociedad de Literatura Española del siglo xix, Barcelona, Universidad de Barcelona, 1996, pp. 119–129.
- David Gies. "Romanticismo e histeria en España", Anales de Literatura Española 18 (2005), pp. 215–225.
- Dorota Heneghan, "Shopping Angel: Fashion, Gender, and Modernity in Galdos' La de Bringas", Dissidences: Hispanic Journal of Theory and Criticism 2 (2006).
- Catherine Jagoe, Alda Blanco, and Cristina Enríquez de Salamanca, La mujer en los discursos de género. Textos y contextos en el siglo xix, Madrid, Icaria, 1995.
- Íñigo Sánchez Llama, "Joaquina García Balmaseda", in Antología de la prensa periódica isabelina escrita por mujeres (1843-1894), Íñigo Sánchez Llama, ed., Cádiz, Servicio de Publicaciones Universidad de Cádiz, 2001, pp. 221–241.
- Carmen Servén, "Fortunata y su época: sobre los modelos de mujer en la España de la Restauración", Alicante, Biblioteca Virtual Miguel de Cervantes, 2003.
- María del Carmen Simón Palmer, "García Balmaseda, Joaquina", in Escritoras españolas del siglo XIX. Manual bio-bibliográfico, Madrid, Castalia, 1991, pp. 284–293.
- Thion Soriano-Mollá, Dolores (2011). "Joaquina García Balmaseda: una escritora isabelina al servicio de la mujer". Anales de Literatura Española (Universidad de Alicante) 23: 381–403. ISSN 0212-5889.
