= Monsieur Lecoq =

Fictional character from novels by Émile Gaboriau

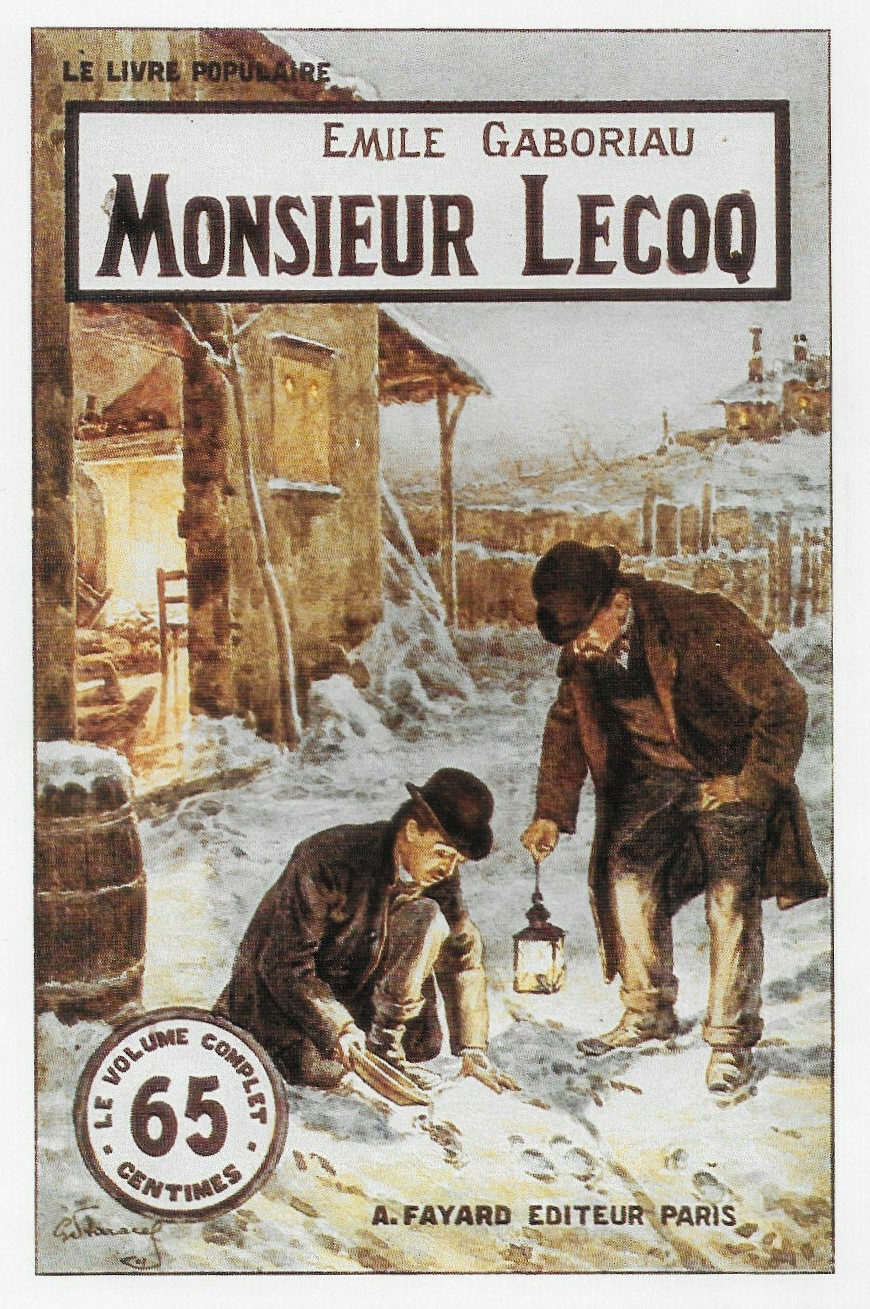
- Monsieur Lecoq, illustrated by Gino Starace
- First appearance: The Lerouge Case (1866)
- Last appearance: A Disappearance (1876)
- Created by: Émile Gaboriau

In-universe information
- Gender: Male
- Occupation: Police detective
- Nationality: French

Monsieur Lecoq is a fictional detective created by Émile Gaboriau, a 19th-century French writer and journalist. Monsieur Lecoq is employed by the French Sûreté. The character is one of the pioneers of the genre and a major influence on Sherlock Holmes (who, in A Study in Scarlet, calls him "a miserable bungler"), laying the groundwork for the methodical, scientifically minded detective. In French, "Monsieur" is "Mister" and his surname literally means "The Rooster".

In the person of armchair detective Tabaret, nicknamed Père Tirauclair (lit. Father Bringer of Light, or "Old man Brings-to-light"), a title Lecoq himself will eventually inherit, Gaboriau also created an older mentor for Lecoq who, like Mycroft Holmes and Nero Wolfe, helps the hero solve particularly challenging puzzles while remaining largely inactive physically. In Tabaret's case, aid is dispensed from the comfort of his bed.

== Inspiration ==
One inspiration for the character of Monsieur Lecoq came from a certain Eugène François Vidocq, a real life criminal who later became a policeman and eventually the first director of the Sûreté. Another influence was a character named Monsieur Lecoq, who appeared in Les Habits Noirs, written by Paul Féval, père who had been Gaboriau's employer in 1862.

Honoré de Balzac introduced the notorious Vautrin, also inspired by Vidocq, in Le Père Goriot in 1834. Also, Alexandre Dumas, père created the character of Monsieur Jackal, the mysterious head of the Paris Sûreté in Les Mohicans de Paris (1854–59).

Lecoq first appears in L'Affaire Lerouge, published in 1866, in which he is described as "formerly an habitual criminal, now at one with the law, skilful at his job". Lecoq plays only a minor role in this story, much of which is taken up by Mister Tabaret, an amateur sleuth nicknamed "Tirauclair" (French for "clarifier"), whom Lecoq recommends to help solve a murder.

== Books ==
Monsieur Lecoq appears in five novels and one short story written by Gaboriau and several pastiches.

=== French works and their English translations ===
1. L'Affaire Lerouge (1866) – The Lerouge Case, The Widow Lerouge
2. Le Crime d'Orcival (1867) – The Mystery of Orcival, Crime at Orcival
3. Le Dossier No. 113 (1867) – File No. 113, Dossier No. 113, The Blackmailers
4. Les Esclaves de Paris (1868) – The Slaves of Paris
5. Monsieur Lecoq (1869)
6. “Une Disparition” in Le Petit Vieux des Batignolles (1876) – “A Disappearance” in The Little Old Man of Batignolles

== Novels by others ==
1. La Vieillesse de Monsieur Lecoq (1878) by Fortune du Boisgobey – The Old Age of Monsieur Lecoq
2. La Fille de M. Lecoq (1886) by William Busnach and Henri Chabrillat – The Daughter of Monsieur Lecoq
3. File No. 114: A Sequel to File No. 113 (1886) by Ernest A. Young (written in English)
4. Le Dernier Dossier de M. Lecoq (1952) by J. Kéry (novella) – Monsieur Lecoq's Last File

== Other popular culture depictions ==
=== Films ===
- Monsieur Lecoq (Fr., B&W, 1914)
  - Dir/Wri: Maurice Tourneur.
  - Cast: Maurice de Féraudy, Charles Kraus, Fernande Petit, Henry Roussel.
- Monsieur Lecoq (US, B&W, 1915)
  - Dir/Wri: Maurice Tourneur.
  - Cast: William Morris (Lecoq), Alphonse Ethier, Florence La Badie, Reginald Barlow.
- The Family Stain [L'Affaire Lerouge] (US, B&W, 1915)
  - Dir/Wri: Wil S. Davis.
  - Cast: Dixie Compton, Frank Evans, Carl Gerard, Stephen Grattan, Edith Hallor.
- File 113 [Le Dossier No. 113] (US, B&W, 1932)
  - Director: Chester Franklin
  - Writer: Jack Natteford
  - Cast: Lew Cody, Mary Nolan, June Clyde.

Zero Mostel was due to co-star with Julie Newmar in Monsieur Lecoq for Columbia Pictures filmed in France and the U.K. in 1967, but the film was never completed.

=== Television ===
- L'Épingle du Jeu [Needle in a Haystack] (6 January 1962)
  - Episode No. 23 of Les Cinq Dernières Minutes [The Last Five Minutes]
  - Dir: Claude Loursais; Wri: André Maheux & Henri Grangé.
  - Regular Cast: Raymond Souplex (Insp. Bourrel), Jean Daurand (Ins. Dupuy).
- Nina Gypsy [Le Dossier 113] (24 July 1971)
  - Dir: Claude-Jean Bonnardoit.
  - Cast: Catherine Rouvel (Nina), Henri Lambert (Lecoq), François Perrot, Jacques Faber.
- Les grands détectives [Monsieur Lecoq] (12 May 1975)
  - Dir: Jean Herman.
  - Cast: Gilles Ségal (Lecoq)
