= Fortuné du Boisgobey =

French novelist

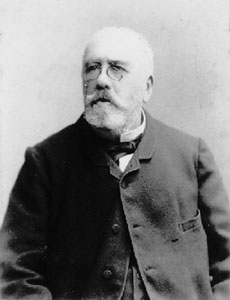
- Fortuné du Boisgobey
- Born: Fortuné Hippolyte Auguste Castille; 11 September 1821; Granville, France
- Died: 26 February 1891 (age 69); Paris, France
- Occupation: Novelist
- Writing career
- Genres: Crime fiction, Detective fiction, Historical fiction, Sensation novel
- Notable works: The Convict Colonel, The Chevalier Casse-Cou, The Old Age of Monsieur Lecoq, An Omnibus Mystery,The Severed Hand

Fortuné Hippolyte Auguste Abraham-Dubois (11 September 1821 – 26 February 1891), under the nom de plume Fortuné du Boisgobey, was a French novelist.

== Life ==
Fortuné du Boisgobey was born at Granville (Manche), and graduated from the Lycée Saint-Louis. He served as paymaster to the Army of Africa through several campaigns in Algeria from 1844 to 1848. His parents were wealthy, yet at forty or upwards, he took to writing.

In 1843, using the name Fortuné Abraham-Dubois, he made his literary debut in the Journal d'Avranches with a series entitled Lettres de Sicile recounting a voyage he had taken the year before. His first successful novel, Les Deux comédiens appeared in 1868, under the du Boisgobey pen name in the Petit Journal. The story was popular, and M. Paul Dalloz of the Petit Moniteur signed a contract with the author for seven years at 12,000ƒ a year. His reputation was increased by the publication of Une Affaire mystérieuse and Le Forçat colonel, both published there in 1869. In 1877, Figaro engaged him for a series of novels, which increased the success of that paper. He was prolific, with more than sixty works to his name, and became one of the most popular feuilleton writers. In 1885 and 1886 he was President of the Committee of the Société des gens de lettres. Du Boisgobey died in 1891 after a long illness.

== Works ==
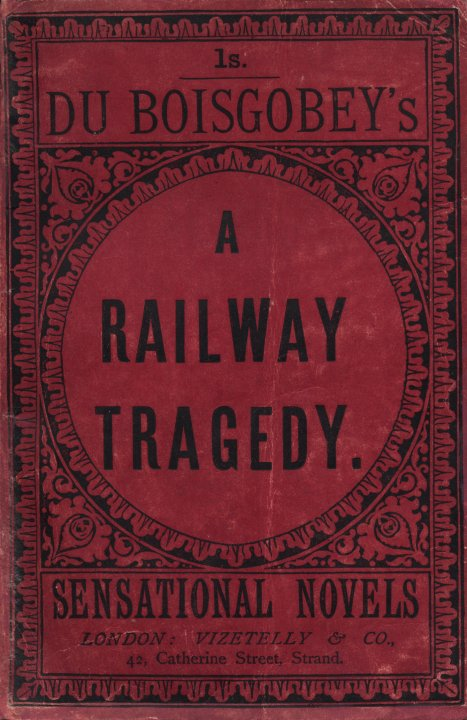
First UK edition of A Railway Tragedy in wraps.

Du Boisgobey was the chief of the followers of Émile Gaboriau, with whom his name is generally associated. He even wrote a sequel, La Vieillesse de M. Lecoq, using Gaboriau's character Monsieur Lecoq in 1877–78. His novels deal with crime, the police, and Parisian life. They had a high circulation, and the greater part of them have been translated into English.

English translations exist for the following works.

- Le Forçat colonel (1871) - The Convict Colonel at the Internet Archive
- Le Chevalier Casse-Cou (1873) - The Chevalier Casse-Cou / The Red Camelia at Google Books
  - Le Camélia rouge - The Red Camelia
  - La Chasse aux ancêtres - The Search for Ancestors
- Le Vrai Masque de fer (1873) - The Iron Mask
- L’As de cœur (1875) - The Ace of Hearts at the Internet Archive
- La Tresse blonde (1875) - The Golden Tress at Google Books
- Le Coup de pouce (1875) - The Thumb Stroke at the Internet Archive
- Les Mystères du nouveau Paris (1876) - The Mysteries of New Paris
- L'Enragé (1876) - Marie-Rose; or, The Mystery
- "La Jambe Noire" (1877) - The Phantom Leg at the Internet Archive
- Les deux merles de M. de Saint-Mars (1878) - Paris: E. Dentu
- Une Affaire mystérieuse (1878) - The Nameless Man at the Internet Archive
- La Vieillesse de M. Lecoq (1878) - The Old Age of Lecoq, the Detective at Google Books
  - Première partie - The Old Age of Monsieur Lecoq
  - Deuxième partie - The Nabob of Bahour
- L'Épingle rose (1879) - The Coral Pin at Google Books
  - Première partie - The Coral Pin
  - Deuxième partie - The Temple of Death
- L'Héritage de Jean Tourniol (1879) - The Robbery of the Orphans; or, Jean Tourniol's Inheritance
- Le Crime de l'Opéra ou "La Rideau Sanglante" (1879) - The Crime of the Opera House / The Opera-House Tragedy
  - Vol. 1 at the Internet Archive
  - Vol. 2 at the Internet Archive
- La Main coupée (1880) - The Lost Casket at Google Books / The Severed Hand at the Internet Archive
  - Première partie - The Countess Yalta; or, The Nihilist Spy
  - Deuxième partie - Doctor Villagos; or, The Nihilist Chief
- Où est Zénobie? (1880) - Where's Zenobia? / Zénobie Capitaine
  - Where's Zenobia? (Volume 1) at the Internet Archive
  - Where's Zenobia? (Volume 2) at the Internet Archive
- Le Tambour de Montmirail (1880) - The Youngest Soldier of the Grand Armée at the Internet Archive
- L'Affaire Matapan (1881) - The Matapan Affair at Google Books / The Matapan Jewels
- L'Équipage du diable (1881) - The Day of Reckoning at Google Books / Satan's Coach
- Le Crime de l'omnibus (1881) - An Omnibus Mystery at Google Books / The Crime in the Omnibus
- Le Pavé de Paris (1881) - A Mystery Still at the Internet Archive
- Les Deux bonnets verts (1881) - Cécile's Fortune at Google Books / Mérindol
- Le Pignon maudit (1882) - A Fight For A Fortune at the Internet Archive / The Privateersman's Legacy
- Le Bac (1882) - Who Died Last? or, The Rightful Heir at Google Books / Was it a Murder? or, Who is the Heir? / The Ferry-Boat / Article 722; or, Roger's Inheritance
- Les Suites d'un duel (1882) - The Results of a Duel at the Internet Archive
- La Revanche de Fernande (1882) - Fernande's Choice at the Internet Archive
- Le Cochon d'or (1882) - The Golden Pig; or, The Idol of Modern Paris at Google Books
- Bouche cousue (1883) - Sealed Lips
- Le Collier d'acier (1883) - The Steel Necklace at Google Books
- Le Coup d'œil de M. Piédouche (1883) - The Detective's Eye at Google Books / The Parisian Detective / Piedouche, a French Detective / The Severed Head; or, A Terrible Confession
- Le Billet rouge (1884) - The Red Lottery Ticket at Google Books / Lover or Blackmailer?
- Le Mari de la diva (1884) - The Prima Donna's Husband at the Internet Archive
- Le Secret de Berthe (1884) - Bertha's Secret at the Internet Archive
  - Première partie - Bertha's Secret
  - Deuxième partie - The Countess de Marcenac
- Babiole (1884) - Pretty Babiole at the Internet Archive
  - Première partie - Babiole, the Pretty Milliner at the Internet Archive
  - Deuxième partie - The Victim of Destiny
- Margot la Balafrée (1884) - In the Serpent's Coils at Google Books / The Vitriol Thrower
  - Première partie - The Sculptor's Daughter
  - Deuxième partie - The Count's Ring
- La Voilette bleue (1885) - The Angel of the Chimes at the Internet Archive / The Angel of the Belfry / The Blue Veil; or, The Crime of the Tower
- Le Cri du sang (1885) - The Cry of Blood at the Internet Archive / A Railway Tragedy at the Internet Archive
- Le Pouce crochu (1885) - Thieving Fingers at Google Books / Zig-Zag the Clown; or, The Steel Gauntlets
- La Belle geôlière (1885) - The Jailor's Pretty Wife at the Internet Archive
- La Bande rouge (1886) - The Red Band; or, The Siege and the Commune at Google Books
  - Première partie - The Red Band
  - Deuxième partie - Scarlet Mystery / The Mystery of the Oak
- Porte close (1886) - The Condemned Door; or, The Secret of Trigavou Castle at the Internet Archive / The Closed Door
- Rubis sur l'ongle (1886) - Cash on Delivery: A Novel of Love and the Passion for Gaming at the Internet Archive
- Cœur volant (1886) - Fickle Heart! a Novel of Love and Racing at the Internet Archive
- "Le Gredins" (1887)
  - His Great Revenge vol.1 at the Internet Archive
  - His Great Revenge vol.2 at the Internet Archive
- Jean Coup-en-deux (1887) - Death or Dishonor at Google Books
- Cornaline la Dompteuse (1887) - The Felon's Bequest at the Internet Archive
- L'Œil-de-chat (1888) - The Cat's-Eye Ring: A Secret of Paris Life
- Grippe-Soleil (1887) - The Bride of a Day: a Story of Paris Life
- Le Chalet des Pervenches (1888) - The Half-Sister's Secret at Google Books
- Mariage d'inclination (1888) - Married for Love at Google Books
- Le plongeur: scènes de la vie sportive (1889) - The High Roller; or, Plunging and Honeyfugling on the Race-Track: A Sporting Romance
- Fontenay Coup-d'Epée (1890) - Fontenay, the Swordsman at Google Books
- Le Chêne-Capitaine (1890) - In Chase of Crime
- Un Cadet de Normandie au XVIIe siècle (1891) - An Ocean Knight; or, The Corsairs and their Conquerors
- Acquittée (1892) - The Mysterious Juror at the Internet Archive
