= La Ilustración Española y Americana =

Magazine of Madrid, Spain, published between 1869 and 1921

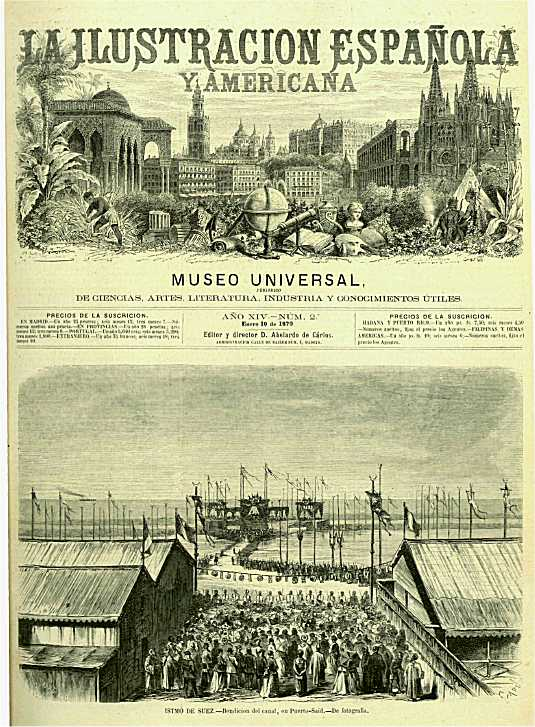
- Cover from January, 1870
- Frequency: Weekly
- Founded: 1869
- Final issue: 1921
- Country: Spain
- Based in: Madrid
- Language: Spanish
- ISSN: 1889-8394

La Ilustración Española y Americana was a weekly Spanish magazine that was published from 1869 to 1921 on the 8th, 15th, 22nd and 30th of every month. It was also published biweekly.

== History ==
The magazine was a continuation of El Museo Universal, which was published from 1857 to 1869, and was modeled after prestigious European publications such as L'Illustration and Le Monde Illustré in France, the Illustrirte Zeitung in Germany, and L'Illustrazione Italiana.

On its masthead, it was described as a magazine of "sciences, arts, literature, trade and useful knowledge". It was founded in 1869 in Madrid by Abelardo de Carlos, a writer and entrepreneur who had previously published two other magazines (La Revista Médica and La Moda Elegante e Ilustrada). Three years later, the building where it was printed collapsed, killing three people, so Carlos rebuilt with a new, state-of-the-art press. He served as the magazine's Director until 1881, when management passed to his sons Abelardo and Isidro, and he died in 1884.

Among the major writers who made contributions may be numbered José Zorrilla, Ramón de Campoamor, Juan Valera, Leopoldo Alas, Ramón del Valle-Inclán and Miguel de Unamuno. It was also one of the vehicles favoured by Emilia Pardo Bazán for the publication of her short stories, in particular between 1909 and 1913. Regular political and journalistic contributors included Emilio Castelar and Manuel Cañete.

== Contents ==
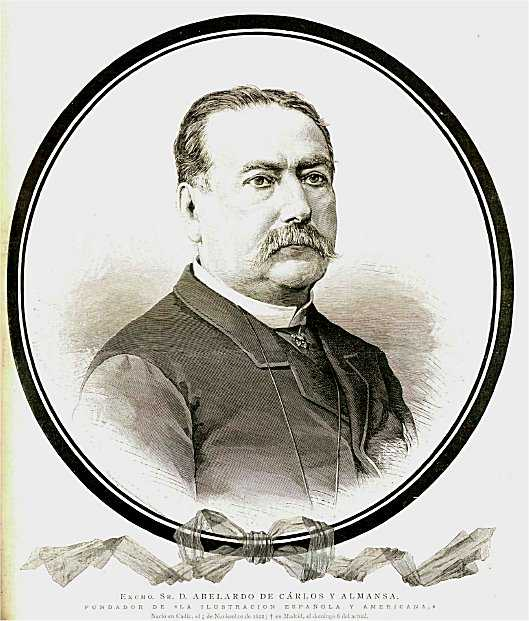
Abelardo de Carlos

As its name would indicate, it was profusely illustrated with scenes from daily life in Spain and Hispanic America, where it was also distributed. It became an "authentic school for masters of the graphic arts". Bernardo Rico y Ortega, an engraver and brother of the painter, Martín Rico, was the Artistic Director; responsible for the magazine's design and printing.

The variety of themes encouraged specialization among the magazine's artistic contributors, such as Josep Lluís Pellicer who, like the later photojournalists of the 20th century, produced first-hand scenes from the Third Carlist War and the Russo-Turkish War. It included also the Restoration, costumbrism and realism.

The long list of regular illustrators included the painters Alejandro Ferrant, Enrique Simonet and Valeriano Bécquer, and humorous cartoonists such as Francisco Ortego Vereda. Also notable were engravings based on images by the French-born photographer Jean Laurent.
