= Monsieur Lecoq (novel) =

1868 novel by Émile Gaboriau

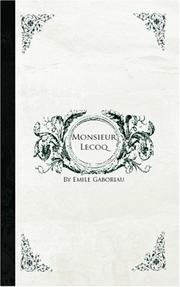
- Author: Émile Gaboriau
- Language: French
- Genre: Detective novel
- Publication date: 27 May 1868 (1st edition)
- Publication place: France
- Media type: Print (Newspaper)

Monsieur Lecoq (trans. Mister Rooster) is a novel by the nineteenth-century French detective fiction writer Émile Gaboriau, whom André Gide referred to as "the father of all current detective fiction". The novel depicts the first case of Monsieur Lecoq, an energetic young policeman who appears in other novels by Gaboriau.

== Background ==
Gaboriau first achieved publishing success with L’Affaire Lerouge, serialised in 1865, which featured the amateur detective, Tabaret, who recurs in his later novels. Gaboriau then went on to publish Le Crime d’Orcival (1867), Le Dossier no. 113 (1867), and Les Esclaves de Paris (1868).

In December 1867, Moïse Millaud and Gaboriau renewed their contract from the previous year, in which Gaboriau had committed to publishing his literary works in Millaud et Compagnie papers. It was decided to publish a longer work that Gaboriau had started in 1864, which he was now finishing. It would be entitled Monsieur Lecoq, the name of the policeman that the two preceding series had made famous. Millaud launched an extensive and shrewd publicity campaign to promote the work. Around 15 April 1868, walls in Paris and other French towns were covered with large multi-coloured posters, emblazoned with
MONSIEUR LECOQ!
MONSIEUR LECOQ!!
MONSIEUR LECOQ!!!
MONSIEUR LECOQ!!!
written in four diagonal lines. On 21 April, the same exclamations appeared on the fourth page on many newspapers, which aroused curiosity. In the Petit Journal of the same date, Timothée Trim feigned ignorance and astonishment, asking "What can this Monsieur Lecoq be?" On 15 May Millaud finally revealed to the public that Monsieur Lecoq was the title of a long work by Emile Gaboriau that they were going to publish. He stated that Monsieur Lecoq, who had hitherto made sporadic appearances in Gaboriau's works, was to be the hero of this new story, and considered that they were correct in stating that this new work was of even greater interest than anything that Gaboriau had published. On 24 May newspaper vendors asked for a considerable increase in copies for the day Monsieur Lecoq was published for the first time. Publication started on 27 May and ended on 3 December, with a one-week break between parts one and two between 31 July and 7 August. The novel was a considerable success.

The novel is split into two parts: I – L’Enquête (The Inquiry), II – L’Honneur du nom (The Honour of the Name). Binyon observes that this is a common structural characteristic of Gaboriau's novels, which separates the different subjects of each part: "Each novel falls into two halves: the first begins with the discovery of the crime and narrates the activities of the detective; the second, which usually takes the form of a complicated family history, describes the events leading up to the crime."

== Inspiration ==
Bonnoit highlights the influence of the Mémoires de Vidocq on Gaboriau, the partly fictionalised memoires of a thief who went on to become the head of the Paris police, particularly the influence of Vidocq's art of disguise. Lits observes that Lecoq's name was clearly formed in imitation of Vidocq, and that this was the name of the policeman in Paul Féval's Habits Noirs. Gaboriau's detectives, both Lecoq and Tabaret, solve crimes in a manner that is similar to that of Edgar Allan Poe's detective, Dupin. As Gaboriau admired Poe, it is not surprising that Lecoq and Dupin share many traits, and Murch observes, "they both regard a mysterious puzzle as a challenge to their powers of perception; they reason with mathematical precision and enjoy giving little lectures on 'algebraic analysis' to their associates."

== Plot summary ==
L'enquête

Policemen on patrol in a dangerous area of Paris hear a cry coming from the Poivrière bar and go to investigate. There is evidence of a struggle. Two dead men are lying next to the fireplace, another is lying in the middle of the room. A wounded man, who is certainly the murderer, stands in a doorway. Gévrol, the inspector, tells him to give himself up, and he protests his innocence, claiming self-defence. He tries to escape, and when he is caught he cries, "Lost…It is the Prussians who are coming." The wounded third man blames Jean Lacheneur for leading him to this place, and vows revenge. He dies shortly afterwards. Gévrol, judging from the man's attire, concludes that he was a soldier, and the name and number of his regiment are written on the buttons of his great coat. His young colleague, Monsieur Lecoq, remarks that the man cannot be a soldier because his hair is too long. Gévrol disagrees. The inspector thinks that the case is straightforward – a pub brawl that ended in murder, whereas Lecoq thinks that there is more to the affair than meets the eye, and asks the inspector if he can stay behind to investigate further, and chooses an older officer, Père Absinthe, to stay with him.

Lecoq expounds his interpretation of the case to him, stating that the vagabond they had arrested is in fact an upper-class man. He comments that the criminal's remark about the Prussians was an allusion to the battle of Waterloo, and reasons that he was waiting for accomplices. He finds footprints in the snow outside the back exit to the bar, revealing the presence of two women, who were helped to escape by an accomplice.

An examination of the body of the supposed soldier leads to the discovery of a note, which reveals that his name was Gustave. Nothing is found on the bodies of the other two men which gives a clue to their identities. The judge, Maurice d’Escoval, arrives and commends Lecoq for the meticulousness of his investigation. After a brief interview with the suspect, the judge leaves suddenly, apparently moved, leaving Lecoq to his own devices. The suspect later tries to commit suicide in his cell. Lecoq continues his investigations the next day, following leads on the two women, but when he goes to report to M. d’Escorval he discovers that he has broken his leg and will be replaced by M. Segmuller. Under interrogation, the suspect maintains that he is an acrobat named Mai, and that he only arrived in Paris on Sunday. He states that he went for a drink in the Poivrière, was mistaken for a police informant, attacked, and defended himself with the revolver he was carrying.

After making further enquiries, including observing the prisoner from above his cell, fail to produce any information, Lecoq decides to take drastic measures. He convinces M. Segmuller to allow him to set a trap by letting the prisoner escape, so that he can follow him. Mai wanders in the streets, followed by Lecoq and Absinthe in disguise, and eventually comes out of a seedy bar with a suspicious-looking man. In the evening, they stop outside a town house, which belongs to the Duke of Sairmeuse and Mai scales the wall, eluding his followers. They arrest his accomplice and search the house and its grounds, but the suspect has vanished.

Lecoq goes to amateur detective, Père Tabaret for advice. Tabaret states that M. d’Escorval's fall and Mai's attempted suicide were not a coincidence, and that the two are enemies. By his reasoning it appears impossible for Mai to be the Duke of Sairmeuse, therefore Mai and the Duke of Sairmeuse are one and the same. Through consultation of biographies of the Duke of Sairmeuse and M. d’Escoval's fathers, he reveals the hatred that exists between the royalist Sairmeuses and the Republican Escorvals. He says that the prisoner tried to kill himself because he thought his identity would be exposed and that this would bring shame on his family name.

L’Honneur du nom

1815. The Duke of Sairmeuse returns from exile to claim possession of his lands, the majority of which are now in the possession of Lachneur, a bourgeois widower who live with his beautiful daughter, Marie-Anne. He claims that he had been charged with their guardianship until the return of the Sairmeuses, but the Duke treats him like a servant and accuses him of profiting from them. In their misfortune, one of their friends, the Baron of Escorval, under police surveillance as a former supporter of the Empire, asks Lacheneur for Marie-Anne's hand in marriage for his son, Maurice, who is in love with and loved by her. He refuses because he is planning an uprising against the Sairmeuses, and does not want Maurice to get caught up in it. Maurice becomes involved in the plans to be closer to Marie-Anne, joining Lacheneur's son, Jean, and Chalouineau, who is secretly in love with Marie-Anne. Stopping at nothing that could help him succeed, Lacheneur is even welcoming to Martial, the marquis de Sairmeuse, who is enamoured with Marie-Anne and hopes to make her his mistress. His fiancé, Blanche, the daughter of the marquis of Courtomieu, is furious and vows revenge on the woman she wrongly considers as her rival.

The uprising fails and the Baron d’Escorval is arrested as the head of the plot, despite having tried to dissuade the rebels from their course of action. He is condemned to death, along with Chalouineau, in a trial presided over by the Duke of Sairmeuse. The baron is saved by Chalouineau, who trades a compromising letter written by the Marquis de Sairmeuse for the chance for the baron to escape. The Duke and Courtomieu accept, but cut the cord that was to help the baron escape as soon as they get hold of the letter. The baron is badly wounded but carried away and cared for by the village curate, father Midon. Chalouineau is executed and leaves all his property to Marie-Anne.

Maurice and Marie-Anne reach Piémont, where a priest marries them in secret. They go to Turin, but Marie-Anne decides to return to France when she learns of her father's arrest and execution.

Maurice, unaware that Martial was not involved in the treachery against his father, writes a letter to him denouncing him. Martial, outraged by Courtomieu's bad faith, reads the letter at the wedding evening, causing a scandal. He vows to live apart from his wife. Marie-Anne takes possession of Chalouineau's house, and conceals the birth of her son, that a Piedmontese peasant takes away to his land in secret.

Blanche, still desiring vengeance against Marie-Anne, gets Chupin to spy on her and slips into her house when she is away and puts poison in a bowl of soup that Marie-Anne drinks on her return. She dies in agony, but sees Blanche who did not have a chance to escape. She pardons her on the condition that she takes care of the son she had with Maurice. Chupin is a witness, but later dies from a stab wound from one of his enemies, but not before revealing Blanche's crime to his oldest son. Martial vows to avenge Marie-Anne, but no-one suspects that Blanche is the murderer. They move to Paris and live separately under the same roof. They soon learn that the Duke is killed when he went out riding on his horse, probably by Jean Lacheneur, who is in hiding. Chupin's eldest son turns up in Paris and blackmails Blanche. She fails to find Marie-Anne's son.

Years pass, Maurice's parents die, and he becomes a judge in Paris. Chupin's eldest son dies, Blanche believes that she is free from the blackmail, but Jean Lacheneur arrives in Paris, aware of who killed his daughter, and decides to exact vengeance on her by using her husband. He makes Chupin's widow begin the blackmail again, and sends an anonymous letter to the duke to draw attention to her movements. Martial is stunned when he sees the seedy bar that his wife has been going to, but glimpses the truth when he finds out that it is owned by Chupin's widow. He finds a compromising letter that Blanche kept and realises that she murdered Marie-Anne.

Martial follows Blanche one night when she goes to the Poivrière to meet Chupin's widow with her chamber maid. Jean Lacheneur has set a trap, in which he intends to lead Martial and Blanche to a notorious place and provoke a scene in which they will find themselves compromised. However, the three criminals he enlists in this scheme let greed take over and try to steal Blanche's diamond earrings. Martial intervenes and has to combat three foes. He promises Chupin's widow a reward if she keeps quiet. The women manage to escape. This takes the reader to the beginning of the affair.

Having found out that Blanche has committed suicide and that M. d’Escorval has been reunited with his son, Lecoq decides to confront the Duke of Sairmeuse, having put together all the pieces of the mystery. One day a red-haired man goes to the Duke's house and gives him an urgent letter from M. d’Escorval, asking him, as a gesture of his gratitude for not revealing his identity, to lend him a large sum of money that he needs. Martial replies with a letter that tells him that his fortune and his life belong to his old enemy, whose generosity have saved him from dishonour. He hands this back to the messenger, who drops his beard and wig: it is Lecoq, who had forged M. d’Escorval's handwriting. The case against the Duke is dismissed, his innocence having been proven, and Lecoq is appointed in the post that he sought.

== Themes and characteristics ==
One of the salient features of detective fiction that is prominent in Monsieur Lecoq is the art of disguise. It is the mark of a good detective, and Lecoq is a master of disguise. Gaboriau also establishes a contrast that was to characterise later detective fiction: the distinction between policemen and amateur detectives. Lecoq has a passion for detection, but he is preoccupied with professional success, while Tabaret carries out detective work without remuneration for the satisfaction and pleasure it provides him. Gaboriau's detectives differ from other detectives in their fallibility. Bonnoit stresses that while they are geniuses of detection, they are not supermen like Dupin or Sherlock Holmes. Goulet highlights the prominence of logical reasoning in Gaboriau, which is a feature of the writing of most detective fiction authors. Gunning considers that Lecoq is the first instance of a detective meticulously scouring a crime scene. He also states that Gaboriau, with Lecoq, 'introduces detailed visual scrutiny to the genre,’ eliciting an account of past events from inanimate objects. Lecoq does not merely look at objects, he reads them. The novel also introduces elements of detection as science, which was later pursued by Sherlock Holmes. Lecoq compares the work of a detective to that of a naturalist, and resolves to observe Mai as minutely as a naturalist examines an insect under a microscope.

== Influence ==
Gaboriau influenced later detective fiction writers, notably Conan Doyle, who acknowledged his debt to Gaboriau. Conan Doyle wrote, 'Gaboriau had rather attracted me by the neat dovetailing of his plots, and Poe’s masterful detective, M. Dupin, had from boyhood been one of my heroes. But could I bring an addition of my own?’ Conan Doyle also uses Gaboriau's two-part structure for two of the four longer Sherlock Holmes stories. Holmes's skill in the art of disguise is equal to that of Lecoq. Liebow observes that there is a startling similarity between Holmes and Lecoq's speech, conduct, and meditations. However, Holmes denigrates Lecoq in A Study in Scarlet, dismissing him as a 'miserable bungler.' Gaboriau was also an influence on John Russell Coryell, who read his works. His detective, Nick Carter, follows in Lecoq and Tabaret's footsteps.

== Adaptations ==
There have been two film adaptations of Monsieur Lecoq: a 1914 French film, and a 1915 American film.
