= The Mystery of Orcival =

1867 novel by Émile Gaboriau

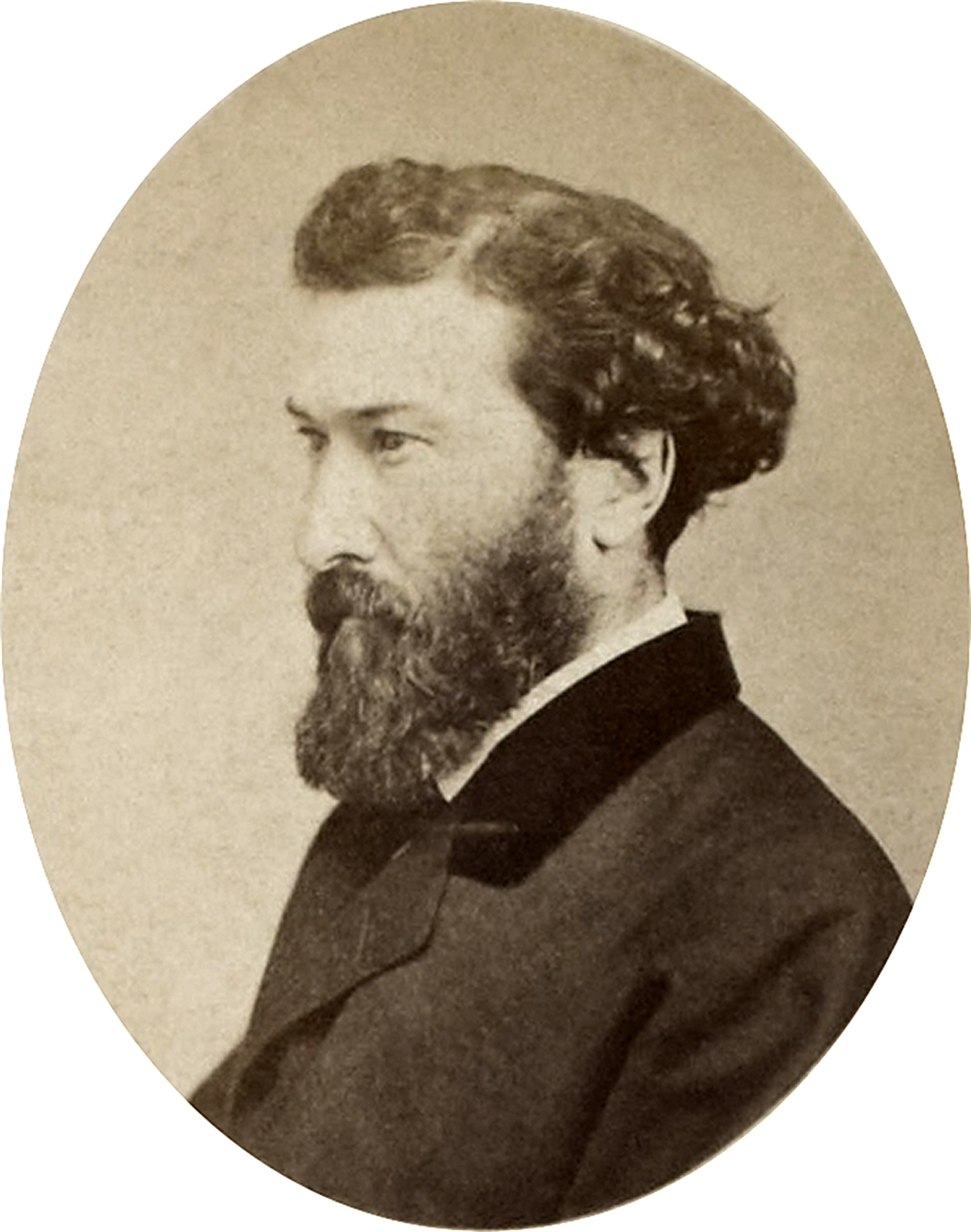
Emile Gaboriau

The Mystery of Orcival (French: Le Crime d'Orcival) is an 1867 detective novel by the 19th century French writer Émile Gaboriau, the second in his Monsieur Lecoq series.

== Publication history ==
The book was first published in French in 1867. An English translation was published in New York by Hoyt and Williams. A version illustrated by Jules Guerin was published in 1900 by Charles Scribner's Sons.

== Synopsis ==
In Orcival, on 9 July 186..., poachers discover the lifeless body of a woman, the Countess of Tremorel, whose identity is quickly established by the police. Not far away, the victim's castle is turned upside down, and there is no trace of the Count of Tremorel. The authorities finally charge a certain Guespin, whom everything seems to point to.

M. Lecoq of the Sûreté, dispatched to the scene by the Prefecture of Police, starts the investigation from scratch, re-establishes the real time of the crime, and finds that neither the Count nor the Countess had slept in the unmade bed that night. The murderer(s) also multiplied the clues, such as five empty glasses to make it look as if there were many of them, and the traces of a fake fight on the sand, in order to throw off suspicion. Lecoq thinks of a plan to solve the enigma, but he is well aware that the outcome of the case remains uncertain.

== Particularities ==
"It is in this novel that Conan Doyle's debt to Gaboriau is best seen. Lecoq's methods of deduction foreshadow the detectives who will follow."
