= Monsieur Lecoq (film) =

- Directed by: Maurice Tourneur
- Written by: Émile Gaboriau (novel); Maurice Tourneur
- Starring: Harry Baur
- Production company: Société Française des Films Éclair
- Release date: 15 May 1914
- Country: France
- Languages: Silent; French intertitles

Monsieur Lecoq is a 1914 French silent mystery film directed by Maurice Tourneur and starring Harry Baur.

== Plot ==
Monsieur Lecoq, a policeman, is investigating a murder case. He will discover that it was in fact a case of blackmail involving the Duke and Duchess of Sairmuse.

== Cast ==
In alphabetical order

- Harry Baur
- Maurice de Féraudy
- Charles Krauss
- Jules Mondos
- Fernande Petit
- Polaire
- Henry Roussel
- Georges Tréville

== Bibliography ==
- Waldman, Harry. Maurice Tourneur: The Life and Films. McFarland, 2001.
