= Manuel Cañete =

The Most Excellent Manuel Cañete
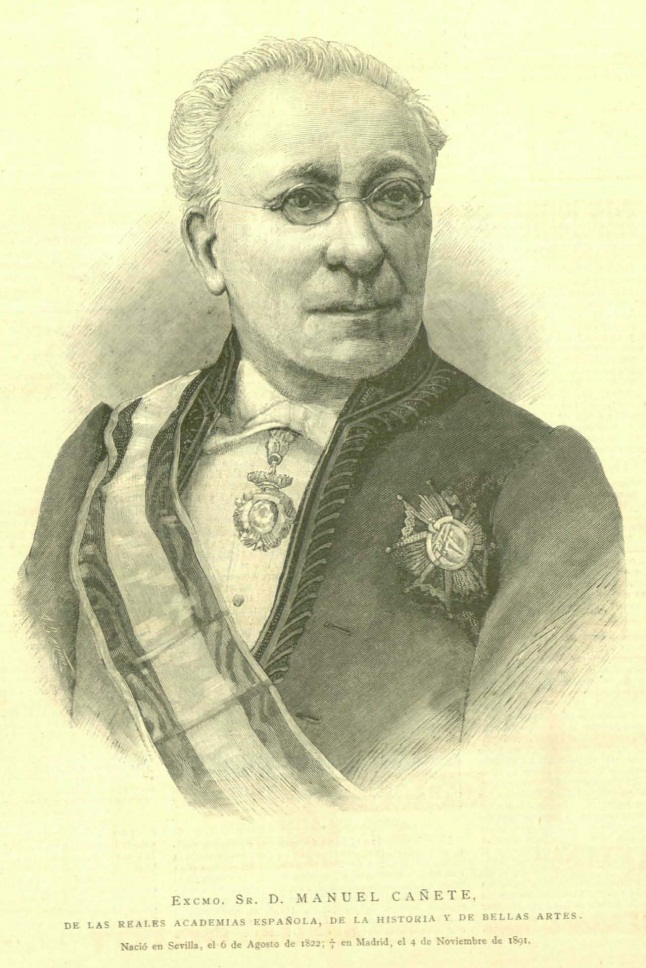
- Portrait published on 15 November 1891 on La Ilustración Española y Americana
- Born: Manuel Cañete; 6 August 1822; Seville, Spain
- Died: 4 November 1891 (aged 69); Madrid, Spain

Seat S of the Real Academia Española
- In office 8 December 1858 – 4 November 1891
- Preceded by: Marcial Antonio López Quílez
- Succeeded by: Santiago de Liniers y Gallo Alcántara

Manuel Cañete (6 August 1822–4 November 1891) was a Spanish journalist, literary critic and playwright whose work is linked to Romanticism.

Cañete was elected to seat S of the Real Academia Española, he took up his seat on 8 December 1858.
