= Émile Gaboriau =

French writer (1832–1873)

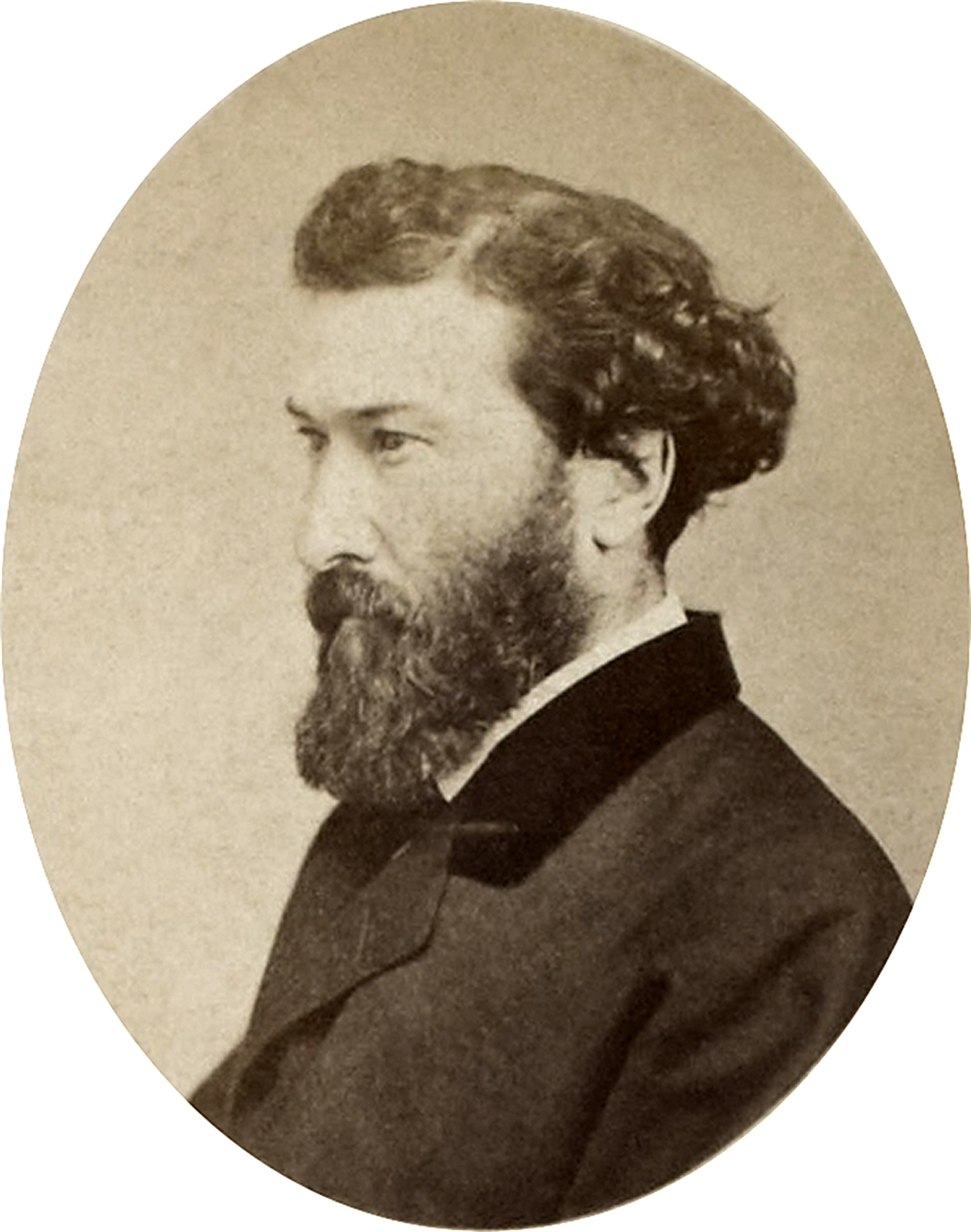
- Born: 9 November 1832; Saujon, France
- Died: 28 September 1873 (aged 40); Paris, France
- Writing career
- Genre: Detective fiction
- Notable work: Monsieur Lecoq (1868)

Étienne Émile Gaboriau (9 November 1832 – 28 September 1873) was a French writer, novelist, journalist, and a pioneer of detective fiction.

== Early life ==
Gaboriau was born in the small town of Saujon, Charente-Maritime. He was the son of Charles Gabriel Gaboriau, a public official and his mother was Marguerite Stéphanie Gaboriau. Gaboriau became a secretary to Paul Féval, and after publishing some novels and miscellaneous writings, found his real gift in L'Affaire Lerouge (1866).

== Literary life ==
Gaboriau's novel L'Affaire Lerouge is widely considered as the first detective story in France. Its structure is characterized as a flashback into the past that serves to inform a present mystery. Influenced by Baudelaire's translations of the stories of Edgar Allan Poe, this work introduced an amateur detective and a young police officer named Monsieur Lecoq, who was the hero in three of Gaboriau's later detective novels. The character of Lecoq was based on a real-life thief turned police officer, Eugène François Vidocq (1775–1857), whose own memoirs, Les Vrais Mémoires de Vidocq, mixed fiction and fact. It may also have been influenced by the villainous Monsieur Lecoq, one of the main protagonists of Féval's Les Habits Noirs book series. Gaboriau was likely influenced also by the philosophy of positivism, promoted by Auguste Comte, which promoted the idea that science could answer all questions. Gaboriau's investigators rely heavily on newly developing scientific methodologies in their pursuit of criminals rather than simply on interrogation and eyewitnesses.

L'Affaire Lerouge was published as a series in the daily Le Soleil and at once made his reputation. Its recounting of a reclusive woman who is murdered for the secret she hides gained for Gaboriau a huge following. But when Arthur Conan Doyle created Sherlock Holmes, Monsieur Lecoq's international fame declined. The story was produced on the stage in 1872. A long series of novels dealing with the annals of the police court followed, and proved very popular. Gaboriau died in Paris of pulmonary apoplexy.

Gaboriau's books were generally well received. About The Mystery of the Orcival, Harper's wrote in 1872: "Of its class of romance—French sensational—this is a remarkable and unique specimen". A film version of Le Dossier n° 113 (File No. 113) was released in 1932.

In A Study in Scarlet, Arthur Conan Doyle has Watson ask Sherlock Holmes what he thinks of Gaboriau's work. Holmes disparages Lecoq as "a miserable bungler". In reality, Conan Doyle was a great admirer of Gaboriau.

== Fiction ==
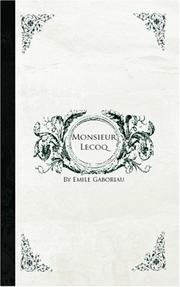
First edition of Monsieur Lecoq

=== Series ===
==== Mariages d'aventure ====
1. Monsieur J.-D. de Saint-Roch, ambassadeur matrimonial – The Matrimonial Ambassador: Monsieur J. D. de Saint-Roch (1862)
2. Promesses de mariage – Promises of Marriage (1862)

==== Lecoq & Others ====
1. L'Affaire Lerouge (1866) – The Widow Lerouge / The Lerouge Case / The Lerouge Affair
2. Le Crime d'Orcival (1867) – The Mystery of Orcival
3. Le Dossier n° 113 (1867) – Dossier No. 113 / File No. 113 / The Blackmailers translated by Fred Williams
4. Les Esclaves de Paris (1868, 2 vol.) – Slaves of Paris (Le Chantage – Caught in the Net) and (Le Secret de la Maison de Champdoce – The Champdoce Mystery)
5. Monsieur Lecoq (1869, 2 vol. – L'Enquête – The Inquiry / Monsieur Lecoq / The Detective's Dilemma) and ( L'Honneur du nom – The Honor of the Name / The Detective's Triumph)
6. La Vie infernale (1870, 2 vol.) – The Count's Millions (Pascal et Marguerite – The Count's Millions) and (Lia d'Argeles – Baron Trigault's Vengeance)
7. La Clique dorée (1871) – The Clique of Gold / The Gilded Clique
8. La Dégringolade (1872) – Catastrophe / The Downward Path
9. La Corde au cou (1873) – Rope Around His Neck / In Peril of His Life / In Deadly Peril
10. L'Argent des autres (1874) – Other People's Money / A Great Robbery
11. Une Disparition (1876) – A Disappearance / Missing! / 1000 Francs Reward

=== Non-Series ===
- Le treizième Hussards (1861) – The 13th Hussars
- Les Gens de Bureau (1862) – The Men of the Bureau
- Les comédiennes adorées (1863)
- Le Petit Vieux des Batignolles (1876) – The Little Old Man of Batignolles
- Le Capitaine Coutanceau (1878) – Captain Coutanceau
- Maudite maison (1876) – The Unfortunate House
- Casta vixit (1876) – Love, the Conqueror
- Amours d'une empoisonneuse (1881) – Intrigues of a Poisoner / An Adventuress of France / The Marquise De Brinvilliers

== Filmography ==
- Monsieur Lecoq, directed by Maurice Tourneur (1914, based on the novel Monsieur Lecoq)
- L'Affaire d'Orcival, directed by Gérard Bourgeois (1914, based on the novel Le Crime d'Orcival)
- Monsieur Lecoq (1915, based on the novel Monsieur Lecoq), with William Morris as Lecoq
- The Family Stain, directed by Will S. Davis (1915, based on the novel L'Affaire Lerouge)
- The Evil Women Do, directed by Rupert Julian (1916, based on the novel La Clique dorée)
- Le Capitaine noir, directed by Gérard Bourgeois (1917)
- Thou Shalt Not Steal, directed by William Nigh (1917, based on the novel Le Dossier n° 113)
- File 113, directed by Chester M. Franklin (1933, based on the novel Le Dossier n° 113), with Lew Cody as Lecoq
- Monsieur Lecoq (TV series, 35 episodes, 1964–65), with Léo Ilial as Lecoq
- Nina Gipsy, directed by Claude-Jean Bonnardot (TV film, 1971, based on the novel Le Dossier n° 113), with Henri Lambert as Lecoq
- Der Strick um den Hals, directed by Wilhelm Semmelroth (TV miniseries, 1975, based on the novel La Corde au cou)
- Die Affäre Lerouge, directed by Wilhelm Semmelroth (TV film, 1976, based on the novel L'Affaire Lerouge)
- La Corde au cou, directed by Marcel Moussy (TV miniseries, 1978, based on the novel La Corde au cou)
