= Grand prix de l'Imaginaire =

- Country: France
- First award: 1974
- Website: https://gpi.noosfere.org

The grand prix de l'Imaginaire (French pronunciation: [ɡʁɑ̃ pʁi də limaʒinɛʁ], lit. 'grand prize of the Imaginary', abbr. GPI), until 1992 the grand prix de la science-fiction française, is a French literary award for speculative fiction, established in 1972 by the writer Jean-Pierre Fontana as part of the science fiction convention of Clermont-Ferrand.

Initially purely a science fiction award, the award's scope was widened to encompass all fields of speculative fiction in 1992. From 2000 to 2010 it was awarded as part of the Utopiales festival in Nantes. It is now part of the Étonnants Voyageurs festival of Saint-Malo.

== Winners ==
Apart from the awards listed here, there are also categories for best new novel, foreign youth novel, translations, comic, manga, and others.

=== French novel ===
- 1974 : Michel Jeury, Le Temps incertain
- 1975 : Philippe Curval, L'Homme à rebours
- 1976 : Philip Goy, Le Livre machine
- 1977 : Michel Demuth, Les Galaxiales
- 1978 : Pierre Pelot, Delirium circus
- 1979 : Yves and Ada Rémy, La Maison du cygne
- 1980 : Daniel Walther, L'Épouvante
- 1981 : Serge Brussolo, Vue en coupe d'une ville malade
- 1982 : Élisabeth Vonarburg, Le Silence de la cité
- 1983 : Pierre Billon, L'Enfant du cinquième nord
- 1984 : Jean-Pierre Hubert, Le Champ du rêveur
- 1985 : André Ruellan, Mémo
- 1986 : Joël Houssin, Les Vautours
- 1987 : Antoine Volodine, Rituel du mépris, variante Moldscher
- 1988 : Serge Brussolo, Opération serrures carnivores
- 1989 : Joëlle Wintrebert, Le Créateur chimérique
- 1990 : Jean-Pierre Andrevon, Sukran
- 1991 : Francis Berthelot, Rivage des intouchables
- 1992 : Joël Houssin, Le Temps du twist
- 1993 : Ayerdhal, Demain, une oasis
- 1994 : Pierre Bordage, Les Guerriers du silence
- 1995 : Laurent Genefort, Arago
- 1996 : Maurice G. Dantec, Les Racines du mal
- 1997 : Jean-Marc Ligny, Inner City
- 1998 : Serge Lehman, F.A.U.S.T.
- 1999 : Roland C. Wagner, Les Futurs Mystères de Paris
- 2000 : Jean-Michel Truong, Le Successeur de pierre
- 2001 : René Reouven, Bouvard, Pécuchet et les savants fous
- 2002 : Pierre Pevel, Les Ombres de Wielstadt
- 2003 : Michel Pagel, Le Roi d'août
- 2004 : Fabrice Colin, Dreamericana
- 2005 : Ayerdhal, Transparences
- 2006 : Alain Damasio, La horde du contrevent
- 2007 : Catherine Dufour, Le Goût de l'immortalité
- 2008 : Wayne Barrow, Bloodsilver
- 2009 : Georges-Olivier Châteaureynaud, L'Autre rive
- 2010 : Stéphane Beauverger, Le Déchronologue
- 2010 : (Étonnants Voyageurs) Justine Niogret, Chien du heaume
- 2011 : Michel Jeury, May le Monde
- 2012 : Roland C. Wagner, Rêves de Gloire
- 2013 : Thomas Day, Du sel sous les paupières
- 2014 : L. L. Kloetzer, Anamnèse de Lady Star
- 2015 : Christophe Lambert (writer), Aucun homme n'est une île
- 2016 : Laurent Genefort, Lum'en
- 2017 : Romain Lucazeau, Latium
- 2018 : Sabrina Calvo, Toxoplasma
- 2019 : Patrick K. Dewdney, Le Cycle de Syffe, tomes 1 & 2

=== French short fiction ===
- 1974 : Gérard Klein, Réhabilitation
- 1975 : Dominique Douay, Thomas
- 1976 : Daniel Walther, Les Soleils noirs d'Arcadie
- 1977 : Philip Goy, Retour à la terre, définitif
- 1978 : Yves Frémion, Petite mort, petite amie
- 1979 : Serge Brussolo, Funnyway
- 1980 : Pierre Giuliani, Les Hautes plaines
- 1981 : Bruno Lecigne, La Femme-escargot allant au bout du monde
- 1982 : Jean-Pierre Hubert, Gélatine
- 1983 : Jacques Mondoloni, Papa Ier
- 1984 : Jean-Claude Dunyach, Les Nageurs de sable
- 1985 : René Reouven, Un fils de Prométhée ou Frankenstein dévoilé
- 1986 : Charles Dobzynski, Le Commerce des mondes
- 1987 : Gérard Klein, Mémoire vive, mémoire morte
- 1988 : Francis Berthelot, Le Parc zoonirique
- 1989 : Richard Canal, Étoile
- 1990 : Colette Fayard, Les Chasseurs au bord de la nuit
- 1991 : Raymond Milési, Extra-muros
- 1992 : Alain Dorémieux, M'éveiller à nouveau près de toi, mon amour
- 1993 : Wildy Petoud, Accident d'amour
- 1994 : Katherine Quenot, Rien que des sorcières
- 1995 : Serge Lehman, Dans l'abîme
- 1996 : Georges-Olivier Châteaureynaud, Quiconque
- 1997 : Serge Lehman, Le Collier de Thasus
- 1998 : Jean-Claude Dunyach, Déchiffrer la trame
- 1999 : Jean-Jacques Nguyen, L'Amour au temps du silicium
- 2000 : Fabrice Colin, Naufrage mode d'emploi
- 2001 : Jeanne Faivre d'Arcier, Monsieur boum boum
- 2002 : Olivier Paquet, Synesthésie
- 2003 : Robert Belmas et Claire Belmas, À n'importe quel prix
- 2004 : Jean-Jacques Girardot, Dédales virtuels
- 2005 : Mélanie Fazi, Serpentine
- 2006 : Claude Ecken, Le monde tous droits réservés
- 2007 : Sylvie Lainé, Les yeux d'Elsa
- 2008 : Catherine Dufour, L'Immaculée conception
- 2009 : Jeanne-A Debats, La Vieille Anglaise et le Continent
- 2010 : Jérôme Noirez, Le Diapason des mots et des misères (collection)
- 2010 : (Étonnants Voyageurs) Léo Henry, Les Trois livres qu'Absalon Nathan n'écrira jamais
- 2011 : Laurent Genefort, Rempart
- 2012 : Christophe Langlois, Boire la tasse (collection)
- 2013 : Bernard Quiriny, Une collection très particulière (collection)
- 2014 : Thomas Day (born 1971), Sept secondes pour devenir un aigle (collection)
- 2015 : Sylvie Lainé, L'Opéra de Shaya (collection)
- 2016 : Laurent Genefort, Ethfrag
- 2017 : Paul Martin Gal, La Cité des Lamentations (collection)
- 2018 : Alain Damasio, Serf-Made-Man ? ou la créativité discutable de Nolan Peskine
- 2019 : Luc Dagenais, La Déferlante des Mères

=== Foreign-language novel ===
- 1992 : Robert R. McCammon, The Wolf's Hour
- 1993 : Garfield Reeves-Stevens, Dark Matter
- 1994 : Jack Finney, Time and Again
- 1995 : Robert Reed, Down the Bright Way
- 1996 : James Morrow, Towing Jehovah
- 1997 : Neal Stephenson, Snow Crash
- 1998 : Clive Barker, Imajica
- 1999 : Valerio Evangelisti, Nicolas Eymerich, Inquisiteur
- 2000 : Orson Scott Card, Seventh Son
- 2001 : Andreas Eschbach, The Carpet Makers
- 2002 : J. Gregory Keyes, Newton's Cannon
- 2003 : Jamil Nasir, Tower of Dreams
- 2004 : Robert Holdstock, Celtika
- 2005 : China Miéville, Perdido Street Station
- 2006 : Christopher Priest, The Separation
- 2007 : Graham Joyce, The Facts of Life
- 2008 : Robert Charles Wilson, Spin
- 2009 : Theodore Roszak, The Crystal Child: A Story of the Buried Life
- 2010 : Ian McDonald, King of Morning, Queen of Day
- 2010 : (Étonnants Voyageurs) Jack O'Connell, The Resurrectionist
- 2011 : Ian McDonald, River of Gods
- 2012 : China Miéville, The City & the City
- 2013 : Paolo Bacigalupi, The Windup Girl
- 2014 : Andrus Kivirähk, The Man Who Spoke Snakish
- 2015 : Peter F. Hamilton, Great North Road
- 2016 : Andri Snær Magnason LoveStar
- 2017 : Ahmed Saadawi, Frankenstein in Baghdad
- 2018 : James Morrow, Galápagos Regained
- 2019 : Ben H. Winters, Underground Airlines
- 2020 : Maryna and Serhiy Dyachenko, Vita Nostra
- 2021 : John Crowley, Ka: Dar Oakley in the Ruin of Ymr
- 2022 : Mariana Enríquez, Nuestra parte de noche

=== Foreign-language short fiction ===
- 1995 : Nancy Kress, Beggars in Spain
- 1996 : Dan Simmons, The Great Lover
- 1997 : Robert J. Sawyer, You See But You Do Not Observe
- 1998 : Poppy Z. Brite, Calcutta, Lord of Nerves
- 1999 : John Crowley, Great Work of Time
- 2000 : Jonathan Carroll, Uh-Oh City
- 2001 : Terry Bisson, Macs
- 2002 : Christopher Priest The Discharge
- 2003 : Graham Joyce, Leningrad Nights
- 2004 : Peter S. Beagle, The Rhinoceros Who Quoted Nietzsche and Other Odd Acquaintances (as a collection)
- 2005 : Paul Di Filippo, Sisyphus and the Stranger
- 2006 : Jeffrey Ford, Exo-skeleton town
- 2007 : Lucius Shepard, Aztechs
- 2008 : Ursula K. Le Guin, Four Ways to Forgiveness (as a collection)
- 2009 : Kelly Link, Stranger Things Happen / Magic for Beginners
- 2010 : Neil Gaiman, Fragile Things (as a collection)
- 2010 : Greg Egan, Oceanic and the story Ted Chiang, Exhalation
- 2011 : Lucius Shepard, Sous des cieux étrangers (French title of a collection)
- 2012 : Lisa Tuttle, Objects in Dreams (as a collection)
- 2013 : Ian McDonald, The Little Goddess
- 2014 : Nina Allan, The Silver Wind (as a collection)
- 2015 : Paolo Bacigalupi, Pump Six and Other Stories (La Fille flûte et autres fragments de futurs brisés) (as a collection)
- 2016 : Ken Liu, The Paper Menagerie and Other Stories
- 2017 : Kij Johnson, The Man Who Bridged the Mist
- 2018 : Nancy Kress, Danses aériennes
- 2019 : Carolyn Ives Gilman, Voyage avec l’extraterrestre

=== Youth Novel ===
- 1982 : Jean-Pierre Andrevon, La Fée et le géomètre
- 1983 : Michel Grimaud, Le Tyran d'Axilane
- 1984 : Thérèse Roche, Le Naviluk
- 1985 : Robert Escarpit, L'Enfant qui venait de l'espace
- 1990 : Roger Leloup, Le Pic des ténèbres
- 1991 : Liliane Korb, Temps sans frontières
- 1992 : Yves Coppens and Pierre Pelot, Le Rêve de Lucy
- 1993 : François Coupry, Le Fils du concierge de l'opéra
- 1994 : Alain Grousset, Les Chasse-marée
- 1995 : Clive Barker, The Thief of Always
- 1996 : Christopher Pike, Fall into Darkness
- 1997 : Raymond Milési, Papa, j'ai remonté le temps
- 1998 : Christian Grenier, Le Cycle du Multimonde
- 1999 : Gérard Moncomble, Prisonnière du tableau !
- 2000 : Gudule, La Fille au chien noir
- 2001 : Francis Berthelot, La Maison brisée
- 2002 : Danielle Martinigol, Les Abîmes d'Autremer
- 2003 : Elvire, Lorris and Marie-Aude Murail,Golem
- 2004 : Fabrice Colin, Cyberpan
- 2005 : Nathalie Le Gendre, Mosa Wosa
- 2006 : Cornelia Funke, Inkheart
- 2007 : Timothée de Fombelle and Bartimaeus Sequence Jonathan Stroud (ex aequo)La Vie suspendue
- 2008 : Scott Westerfeld, Uglies
- 2009 : Gemma Malley, The Declaration
- 2010 : Anne Fakhouri, Le Clairvoyage and La Brume des jours

=== French Youth Novel ===
- 2010 (Étonnants Voyageurs) : Victor Dixen, Été mutant (le Cas Jack Spark - 1)
- 2011 : François Place, La Douane volante
- 2012 : Frédéric Petitjean, La Route des magiciens
- 2013 : Hervé Jubert, Magies secrètes
- 2014 : Victor Dixen, La Malédiction de Boucle d'or (Animale - 1)
- 2015 : Jean-Luc Marcastel, La Seconde Vie de d'Artagnan
- 2016 : Christelle Dabos, La Passe-miroir (tomes 1 et 2)
- 2017 : Roxane Dambre, Scorpi (tomes 1 à 3)
- 2018 : Ange, Sang maudit
- 2019 : Nathalie Somers, Roslend (tomes 1 à 3)
- 2020 : Judith Bouilloc, L'Arrache-mots
- 2021 : E. S. Green, Steam Sailors (tomes 1 et 2)

=== Special Prize ===
- 1976 : Urm le fou by Philippe Druillet
- 1977 : Yves Dermèze for all of his work
- 1979 : the fantastic hyperrealistic universe of Wojciech Siudmak
- 1980 : Major fatal by Mœbius
- 1980 : Civilisations et Divagations by Louis-Vincent Thomas
- 1981 : Fantascienza (no. 2-3) by Claude Eckerman, Alain Grousset and Dominique Martel
- 1982 : Essai psychanalytique sur la création littéraire - Processus et fonction de l'écriture chez un auteur de Science-fiction : Philip K. Dick by Marcel Thaon
- 1983 : Le Bunker de la dernière rafale by Marc Caro and Jean-Pierre Jeunet
- 1984 : Le Rayon SF by Henri Delmas and Alain Julian
- 1985 : La Nouvelle Science-fiction américaine by Gérard Cordesse
- 1987 : Le Détroit de Behring by Emmanuel Carrère
- 1988 : Le Combat d'Odiri by Georges-Olivier Châteaureynaud
- 1989 : Les Voyages ordinaires d'un amateur de tableaux by Dominique Douay
- 1990 : Philippe Curval for his work as an anthologist and talent scout
- 1991 : Jean-Pierre Nicollet for all of his work
- 1992 : La Grande Anthologie de la science-fiction française by Ellen Herzfeld, Gérard Klein and Dominique Martel
- 1993 : L'Atalante publishing house for the quality and originality of their production
- 1994 : Regards sur Philip K. Dick, le Kaledickoscope by Hélène Collon
- 1995 : Les Nourritures extraterrestres by Dona Sussan
- 1996 : CyberDreams magazine
- 1997 : Mad Movies magazine
- 1998 : Ozone by Henri Lœvenbruck
- 1999 : Le Visage vert by Xavier Legrand Ferronnière
- 2000 : Stéphanie Nicot, Galaxies
- 2001 : Pierre Pelot, Sous le vent du monde
- 2002 : Stephen King, Ténèbres magazine, special issue
- 2003 : Robert Holdstock, La Forêt des mythagos
- 2004 : Terra Incognita, collection
- 2005 : the website of the nooSFere association
- 2006 : Le Troisième Œil. La Photographie et l'Occulte
- 2007 : the periodical anthology Fiction (Les Moutons électriques)
- 2008 : the TV film Des Fleurs pour Algernon by David Delrieux
- 2009 : Le Bélial' editions for the unpublished works by Poul Anderson and Le Grand livre de Mars by Leigh Brackett
- 2010 : Le Lac aux Vélies by Nosfell and Ludovic Debeurme
- 2010 : (Étonnants Voyageurs): Jean-Marc Lofficier and Brian Stableford for their work promoting and translating French-speaking SF at Black Coat Press
- 2011 : Poètes de l'Imaginaire (anthology) by Sylvain Fontaine
- 2012 : José Corti publishing house, for more than 70 years serving the Imagination
- 2013 : Ad Astra editions, for the publication of the complete Cycle de Lanmeur (2 volumes) by Christian Léourier and the Délirium label, for the publication of the anthologies Creepy and Eerie
- 2014 : the synchronous edition of L'Intégrale Stefan Wul by Bragelonne and the Univers of Stefan Wul by Ankama, adaptations of the novels into comics by D. * Cassegrain, M. Hawthorne, D. Lapiere, J.-D. Morvan, M. Reynes, O. Vatine, Yann...
- 2015 : Richard Comballot for his work on the memory of the imagination, including his collection of interviews Clameurs
- 2016 : Natacha Vas-Deyres and Richard Comballot for the Chronolytic Notebooks of Michel Jeury
- 2017 : Hélène Collon and Editions Nouveaux Millénaires for the publication of The Exegesis of Philip K. Dick
- 2018 : Ellen Herzfeld and Dominique Martel for their work in the service of science fiction for over thirty years, including the Quarante-Deux website and the collections from the Quarante-Deux collection published by Éditions du Bélial'
- 2019 : Guy Costes and Joseph Altairac for their journey as scholars and collectors for more than 40 years, materialized by their monumental work Rétrofictions
- 2020 : the BnF for the Tolkien, Voyage en Terre du Milieu exhibition
- 2021 : Jacques Abeille, Le Cycle des contrées
- 2022 : Alain Sprauel for his meticulous and tireless work as bibliographer of the Imagination, and in particular The 2021 bibliography of Stephen King
- 2023 : Les Galaxiales - L'Intégrale by Michel Demuth, completed by nine authors brought together by Richard Comballot from the initial plan and synopses
