= Ruellan =

Ruellan is a surname. It may refer to:

- André Ruellan (1922–2016), French science fiction and horror writer
- Andrée Ruellan (1905–2006), American painter
- Ruellan brothers (les frères Ruellan), French siblings from Paramé (now Saint-Malo), Brittany, who fought during the First World War. Ten brothers, from a family of fifteen children, were on the front lines
