= Gilles Thomas (writer) =

French writer

Éliane Taïeb (December 7, 1929 – September 3, 1985), née Grimaître, was a French science fiction writer who published under the pen names Gilles Thomas and Julia Verlanger.

== Bibliography ==
- Les Portes Sans Retour [The Gates Of No Return] (1976)
- La Flûte de Verre Froid [The Flute Of Cold Glass] (1976)
- Les Hommes Marqués [The Marked Men] (1976)
- L'Autoroute Sauvage [The Savage Highway] (1976)
- La Croix des Décastés [The Cross Of The Outcasts] (1977)
- La Mort en Billes [The Marbled Death] (1977)
- Magie Sombre [Dark Magic] (1977)
- Les Ratés [The Losers] (1977)
- Les Voies d’Almagiel [The Ways Of Almagiel] (1978)
- La Légende des Niveaux Fermés [The Legend Of The Closed Levels] (1978)
- L'Ange aux Ailes de Lumière [The Angel With Wings Of Light] (1978)
- L'Ile Brûlée [The Burned Island] (1979)
- D’un Lieu Lointain Nommé Soltrois [From A Far Place Called Solthree] (1979)
- La Jungle de Pierre [The Stone Jungle] (1979)
- Horlemonde [Worldbeyond] (1980)
- La Porte des Serpents [The Gate Of The Serpents] (1980)
- Les Cages de Beltem [The Cages Of Beltem] (1982); revised as Acherra (1995) and Offren (1995)
- Les Oiseaux de Cuir [The Birds Of Leather] (1996)
- La Révélation [The Revelation] (with Gudule) (1996)
- Les Bulles [The Bubbles] (1996)

== Commentary ==
Apart from a cycle of three post-apocalyptic novels (L'autoroute sauvage, La mort en billes and L'île brûlée), all Gilles Thomas' novels take place in a fictional universe where humanity is no longer restricted to the Earth as its only habitat. This has been described as a "History of the future beneath the surface" by French science fiction scholar André-François Ruaud ("Histoire du Futur en filigrane") because, while almost no allusions are made to the process which led man to conquer other planets in Thomas' novels, the galactic backdrop remains ever present even on a medieval world.

== Prix Julia Verlanger ==
The Prix Julia Verlanger, run by the Fondation de France, is awarded annually to a science fiction work of adventure, fantasy or fantastique. Created by her husband after her death, it is awarded by a jury of which he was the president until his death. The current president is Sara Doke.

The most recent books to receive the prize are

- The Parasol Protectorate by Gail Carriger (2013)
- the trilogy Le Melkine by Olivier Paquet (2014).
- 'Lum'en by Laurent Genefort (2015).
- Le club des punks contre l'apocalypse zombie by Karim Berrouka (2016).
- Les voyageurs, tome 3 : Archives de l'exode by Becky Chambers (2017).
- Le cycle de Syffe, tome 1 : L'enfant de poussière by Patrick K. Dewdney (2018).
- Les meurtres de Molly Southbourne by Tade Thompson (2019).

The novel Les cages de Beltem by Gilles Thomas received the Prix Julia Verlanger in 1996. The decision to award a prize named for one of Éliane Taïeb's pen names (under which name she published La flûte de verre froid) to a novel by her other pseudonym was taken by the jury because of the lack of quality of the works published in that year in the eligible categories.
