= Le Goût de l'immortalité =

Science fiction novel by Catherine Dufour

- Author: Catherine Dufour
- Language: French
- Genre: Science fiction, feminist science fiction, cyberpunk
- Publisher: fr:Éditions Mnémos
- Publication date: 2005
- Media type: Print (paperback)
- ISBN: 978-2-253-11929-6

Le Goût de l'immortalité is a French dystopian and cyberpunk science fiction novel by Catherine Dufour published in 2005 by Mnémos. It was awarded the Grand prix de l'Imaginaire in 2007 and has established its author as a key figure on the French science fiction scene.

== Description ==
The novel is a cyberpunk dystopia set in a terrifying universe where pollution and violence prevail, creating a sense of despair among the main protagonists. Biotechnology and immortality seem at first to have liberating effects on humans who use them, but ends up imprisoning them in despair and sadness.

Each protagonist's biography is explored in detail, creating confusion for the reader wondering at first where the story will land. The narrative structure and the prose is sophisticated, as the author wished to produce a first science fiction novel "calibrated for men" that would take her away from her fantasy world. In her own words the novel has :

No emotion, a lot of politics, an abundant and very complicated plot that nobody understands, not even me

== Resume ==
In a dystopian future obsessed with genetic modification and plagued by pollution, the daughter of a Manchu prostitute lives in the hyper-technological city of Ha Rebin. A loner, she has developed a sharp intelligence. More than two centuries old, she looks back on her adolescence to tell the story of a man who spent some time with her, a Northern European entomologist called Cmatic. He had come to China to investigate a mysterious disease, and was in danger of falling victim to it himself. The novel takes the form of a long letter, modelled on Marguerite Yourcenar's Memoirs of Hadrian, from which the author drew inspiration, seeking in particular to recapture its rhythm.

== Reception ==
The novel was reviewed by Xavier Bruce in Galaxies magazine No. 39 (2006), p. 197–198 and by in Bifrost. Natacha Vas-Deyres, researcher from université Bordeaux-Montaigne describes the novel as dystopian. Marcus Dupont-Besnard from Numerama lists the novel as a reference in the French science fiction cyberpunk genre, some critics claiming that the sharp turn towards science fiction of the author brings a renewal in the science fiction landscape.

This novel has established its author as a key figure on the French science fiction scene.

== Awards ==
- Prix Bob-Morane 2006.
- Prix Rosny aîné 2006.
- Prix du Lundi 2006.
- Grand prix de l'Imaginaire 2007.
