= Cycle de la tour de garde =

The Cycle de la tour de garde is a fantasy series by French authors Guillaume Chamanadjian and Claire Duvivier published between 2021 and 2023. The series consists of two interlinked trilogies, the Capitale du nord trilogy by Chamanadjian and the Capitale du sud trilogy by Duvivier.

== Publishing history ==
=== Capitale du nord ===
#	Title	Pages	Release	Ref.
1	Le Sang de la cité		2021	
2	Trois Lucioles		2022	
3	Les Contes suspendus		2023	

=== Capitale du sud ===
#	Title	Pages	Release	Ref.
1	Citadins de demain		2021	
2	Mort aux geais !		2022	
3	L'armée fantoche		2023	

== Themes and analysis ==
The idea for the series first originated in a 2013 trip the authors took to Siena, Italy, with the authors taking inspiration from the intrigues of the Italian Renaissance.

== Reception ==
=== Awards ===
- 2021 Prix Imaginaire from the association La 25e Heure du Livre
- 2022 Prix Imaginaire from the association Libr'à Nous
- 2024 special award from the Grand prix de l'Imaginaire
