= Henri René Guieu =

French writer and ufologist

Henri René Guieu (19 March 1926 – 2 January 2000) was a French science fiction writer and ufologist, who published primarily with the pseudonym Jimmy Guieu. He occasionally used other pseudonyms as well, including Claude Vauzière for a young adult series, Jimmy G. Quint (with Georges Pierquin) for a number of espionage novels, Claude Rostaing for two detective novels and Dominique Verseau for six erotic novels.

== Overview ==
Guieu was one of the authors published by Fleuve Noir company's Anticipation science fiction imprint.

His first novel, Le Pionnier de l'Atome [The Pioneer of the Atom] (1952), concerned a journey into the microcosmos through psychic powers. With his second novel, Au-delà de l'Infini [Beyond Infinity] (1952), Guieu introduced the character of American biologist Jerry Barclay and reversed the theme. This time, it was our universe that was a microcosmos contained within the knee of a beautiful woman from a macrocosmos. Guieu continued the Jerry Barclay series for three more books.

With La Dimension X [Dimension X] (1953) and Nous les Martiens [We The Martians] (1954), Guieu introduced a new hero: archeologist Jean Kariven. In the Kariven series, Guieu began to explore his favorite themes such as UFOs, close encounters, Erich Von Däniken-like theories of ancient astronauts, secret societies, lost civilizations and occult conspiracies. Throughout his novels he featured footnotes claiming that the various facts upon which he was basing his tales were indeed "authentic". In Nous les Martiens [We The Martians], Kariven discovers that, during the remote past, men had emigrated to Earth from Mars. Eight more Kariven novels were published subsequently, often pitting good aliens from Polaris versus evil aliens from Deneb with Earth secretly caught in the middle. Univers Parallèles [Parallel Universes] featured a crossover with Jerry Barclay.

Guieu continued to exploit his UFO and occult theme with increasing success. After the Kariven series, he published a number of novels unrelated to each other, except for two that featured a team of American investigative reporters, Ericksson and Wendell: Les Monstres du Néant [The Monsters From The Void] (1956) and Les Êtres de Feu [The Beings of Fire] (1956).

He also wrote two non-fiction books about UFOs, one of the first published into the story of ufology, Les Soucoupes Volantes viennent d'un Autre Monde [The Flying Saucers Come From Another World] and Black-Out sur les Soucoupes Volantes [Black-Out on the Flying Saucers], the latter prefaced by Jean Cocteau, and by the 1970s, had become a major French ufologist.

Simultaneously, Guieu began to chronicle the exploits of two daring space traders, Blade and Baker. The series began with Les Forbans de l'Espace [The Space Pirates] (1963).

During 1967, with Le Retour des Dieux [The Return of the Gods], Guieu revamped the Kariven character into that of journalist Gilles Novak who, with the help of his girl-friend Régine Véran, and various friends and allies, often real-life friends of Guieu or thinly-disguised real-life figures, fought against would-be tyrants, communists, terrorists, drug cartels and various alien menaces. Novak was helped in his struggles by Michael Merkavim, the commander of a new, powerful Order of Knights Templar, equipped with futuristic weapons and based in a parallel universe. Merkavim was introduced in Les Sept Sceaux du Cosmos [The Seven Seals of the Cosmos] (1968) and L'Ordre Vert [The Green Order] (1969). The theme was later developed as the Les Chevaliers de Lumière ("The Knights of Light") sub-series.

Guieu was granted his own imprint during 1979. At first, it reprinted rewritten, updated versions of his original novels, then it began publishing a series of "sharecropping" novels, featuring Gilles Novak, Blade and Baker, Jean Kariven, etc., written by other writers, mostly Roland C. Wagner, but also Philippe Randa, Nicolas Gauthier and Laurent Genefort.

During the early 1990s, Jimmy Guieu wrote two docu-dramas, using as plot the Grey aliens / Majestic-12 conspiracy as described by John Lear and Milton William Cooper : the series "E.B.E." (for "Extraterrestrial Biological Entity") : E.B.E. : Alerte rouge (first part) (1990) and E.B.E. : L'entité noire d'Andamooka (second part) (1991).

== Works ==
=== Documentaries ===
- Les soucoupes volantes viennent d'un autre monde, Fleuve noir, 1954, 254 pages
- Black-Out sur les soucoupes volantes, Vaugirard, 1956, 392 pages
- Le Livre du Paranormal, 1992
- Contacts Ovni Cergy-Pontoise, J. Guieu, F. Fontaine, J.P. Prévost, S. N'diaye, Éditions du Rocher 1980.
- Le monde étrange des contactés, Éditions Belfond 1986 / Re-published with the title : Nos « Maîtres » les extraterrestres, Presses de la Cité, 1992, 344 pages.
- Terre, ta civilisation fout le camp (unpublished, but has been divulgated on the Web), 1998

=== Science fiction ===
- Le Pionnier de l'atome (1952)
- Au-delà de l'infini (1952)
- L'Invasion de la Terre (1952)
- Hantise sur le monde (1953)
- L'Univers vivant (1953)
- La dimension X (1953)
- Nous les martiens (1954)
- La spirale du temps (1954)
- Le monde oublié (1954)
- L'homme de l'espace (1954)
- Opération Aphrodite (1955)
- Commandos de l'espace (1955)
- L'agonie du verre (1955)
- Univers parallèles (1955)
- Nos ancêtres de l'avenir (1956)
- Les Monstres du néant (1956)
- Prisonniers du passé (1956)
- Les êtres de feu (1956)
- La mort de la vie (1957)
- Le règne des mutants (1957)
- Créatures des neiges (1957)
- Cité Noé 2 (1957)
- Le rayon du cube (1958)
- Convulsions solaires (1958)
- Réseau dinosaure (1958)
- La force sans visage (1958)
- Expédition cosmique (1959)
- Les cristaux de Capella (1959)
- Piège dans l'espace (1959)
- Chasseurs d'hommes (1960)
- Les sphères de Rapa-Nui (1960)
- L'ère des biocybs (1960)
- Expérimental X-35 (1960)
- Spoutnik VII a disparu (1960)
- Planète en péril (1961)
- La caverne du futur (1961)
- La grande épouvante (1961)
- L'invisible alliance (1961)
- Trafic interstellaire (1961)
- Le secret des Tshengz (1962)
- Opération Ozma (1962)
- L'âge noir de la Terre (1962)
- Oniria (1962)
- Echec aux Végans (1962)
- Mission "T" (1963)
- Les forbans de l'espace (1963)
- Projet King (1963)
- Les destructeurs (1963)
- Les portes de Thulé (1964)
- Le retour des Dieux (1967)
- Les sept sceaux du cosmos (1968)
- Joklun-n'ghar la maudite (1968)
- La terreur invisible (1968)
- Refuge cosmique (1968)
- L'ordre vert (1969)
- Traquenard sur Kenndor (1969)
- Demain l'apocalypse (1969)
- L'arche du temps (1970)
- Le triangle de la mort (1970)
- Plan catapulte (1970)
- Les orgues de Satan (1971)
- La voix qui venait d'ailleurs (1971)
- Le grand mythe (1971)
- La charnière du temps (1971)
- Enjeu cosmique (1972)
- Les maîtres de la galaxie (1972)
- Les rescapés du néant (1972)
- La mission effacée (1973)
- Opération Neptune (1973)
- Les germes du chaos (1973)
- Les veilleurs de Poséïdon (1974)
- L'exilé de Xantar (1974)
- Le maître du temps (1974)
- Manipulations psi (1974)
- Les pièges de Koondra (1975)
- Les fugitifs de Zwolna (1975)
- Les Krolls de Vorlna (1975)
- Le bouclier de Boongoha (1975)
- La stase achronique (1976)
- La colonie perdue (1976)
- La lumière de Thot (1977)
- Les légions de Bartzouk (1977)
- Les yeux de l'épouvante (1978)
- Hiéroush, la planète promise (1979)
- La clé du mandala (1980)
- Les fils du serpent (1984)
- La force noire (1987)
- Le pacte de Kannlor (1987)
- La terreur venue du néant (1987)
- Narkoum, finances rouges (1987)
- Plan d'extermination (1988)
- Réseau Alpha (1988)
- L'héritage de Noé (1988)
- Les sentiers invisibles (1989)
- L'empire des ténèbres (1989)
- Le piège du val maudit (1991)
- Magie rouge (1992) (Adaptation from a project of TV scenario written in 1969)
- Psiboy, l'enfant du cosmos (1996)
- Un terrestre extra (1997)
- E.B.E. 1: Alerte rouge (1990)
- E.B.E. 2: L'entité noire d'Andamooka (1991)

Into the 2000s, the éditions "Rivières blanches" have published some unpublished novels: Les dossiers du glaive (2008) and Psycho-évolution Rh (2010)

=== Espionage/detective (co-writing with Georges Pierquin, and under the name Jimmy G. Quint) ===
- Habanita n'y est pour rien (1952)
- Prisonnières des sadiques (1954)
- Destination cataclysme (1960)
- Vengez ma trahison (1961)
- Pouvoirs spéciaux (1961)
- Vipères sous roche (1962)
- Alerte zone 54 (1962)
- Le repaire des maudits (1965)
- Une garce nommée Bianca (1997)
- Moscou, heure espace (1965)
- Traquenard à l'OTAN (1966)
- Plan Hérode 65 (1966)
- Baroud à Bendor (1966)
- Terreur à Ouranos (1967)
- Les corruptibles (1967)
- Rhapsodie en rouge (1967)
- Ombres sur l'Ancerville (1967)

=== Erotic stories (under the name Dominique Verseau) ===
- Yolanda et les voluptés cosmiques (1971)
- Yolanda et la planète aux supplices (1971)
- Les esclaves de l'espace (1972)
- L'univers érotique (1972)
- Holocauste pour une momie (1990)
- Des nymphes pour le diable (1991)

=== Documentary films ===
- O.V.N.I. - E.B.E. - L'invasion a commencé (1991)
- Les vies antérieures - Etapes vers la lumière (1991)
- Les Cathares - Le message de Montségur (1992)
- Rennes le Château 1 - Le grand mystère (1992)
- Les lieux hantés - Au-delà ou autres dimensions ? (1992)
- Les gouvernants secrets 1 - Nos visiteurs : les extraterrestres (1992)
- Les gouvernants secrets 2 - Nos maîtres : les extraterrestres (1992)
- Les gouvernants secrets 3 - Extraterrestres : les ambassadeurs (1993)
- Contacts espace-temps - Jean-Claude Pantel et ses étranges visiteurs (1993)
- OVNI - USA - Nouvelles révélations (1993)
- Les vortex - Les dimensions cachées (1993)
- Rennes le Château 2 - Demain : l'héritage révélé (1993)
- Théopolis - La cité oubliée (1994)
- OVNI en France - Les vérités cachées (1994)

== Sources ==
Four reference articles on Jimmy Guieu by Richard D. Nolane, written in French, are available at the Le Monde du fleuve (noir) website.
