= Anne Fakhouri =

French author (1974–2022)

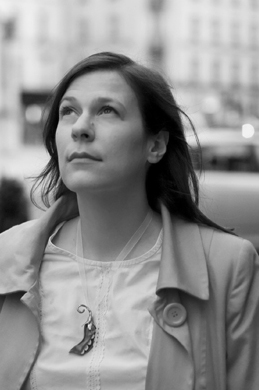
- Fakhouri in 2008
- Born: 3 March 1974; Paris, France
- Died: 9 November 2022 (aged 48); Rennes, France
- Occupations: Author; Teacher; Anthologist

Anne Fakhouri (3 March 1974 – 9 November 2022) was a French author, teacher, and anthologist. Her genres included fantasy and chick lit, commonly under the pseudonyms Elie Grimes or Hannah Bennett.

== Biography ==
In 2008, L'Atalante published the first book by Fakhouri, a youth diptych with the titles Le Clairvoyage and La Brume des jours, for which she received the Grand prix de l'Imaginaire in 2010. She changed themes in 2011 with Narcogenèse, an adult thriller. She then began writing youth and adult novels under pseudonyms.

Fakhouri died of cancer in Rennes on 9 November 2022, at the age of 48.

== Books ==
=== Youth novels ===
- Le Clairvoyage (2008)
- La Brume des jours (2009)
- L'Horloge du temps perdu (2013)
- Hantés (2013)
- Piégés (2015)

=== Under the pseudonym Hannah Bennett ===
- Harper in summer (2017)
- Harper in fall (in love) (2018)
- Harper in winter (2018)
- Harper in spring (2019)
- Prudence et sa famille improbable (2020)
- Harper (15 ans). 1 : Les Secrets (2021)
- Harper (15 ans). 2 : Les Choix (2021)
- Harper (15 ans). 3 : Les Espoirs (2022)

=== Adult novels ===
- Narcogenèse (2011)
- American Fays (2014)

=== Under the pseudonym Elie Grimes ===
- Les gentilles filles vont au paradis, les autres là où elles veulent (2017)
- Mrs Stafford et le Capitaine Conrad (2021)

=== Anthologies ===
- Au travers du labyrinthe (2005)
- Fugue en ogre mineur (2006)
- Fées dans la ville (2009)
