= Alain Dorémieux =

French writer (1933–1998)

Alain Dorémieux (born Paris, France 15 August 1933; died Paris, 26 July 1998) was a French writer, editor, translator, anthologist and critic of science fiction. He is best known as the editor for more than 20 years of Fiction (French edition of The Magazine of Fantasy & Science Fiction), the leading journal of science fiction and fantasy in France until 1990.

Dorémieux has published under various pen names: Gilbert Atlante, Luc Vigan (with Gérard Klein and André Ruellan), Monique Dorian (a pseudonym shared with his wife Monique), and anagrammatic pseudonyms Daniel Meauroix and Alex Dieumorain for his translations. His critical work has often been published under the pseudonym of Serge-André Bertrand.

A literary prize for the first publication of young writers of science fiction was established in 2000 that bears Dorémieux's name.
