= Gandahar (film) =

1987 film by René Laloux

- French film poster
- Directed by: René Laloux
- Written by: René Laloux
- Based on: Les Hommes-machines contre Gandahar by Jean-Pierre Andrevon
- Produced by: Jean-Claude Delayre; Henri Rollin
- Edited by: Christine Pansu
- Music by: Gabriel Yared
- Distributed by: Acteurs Auteurs Associés
- Release date: 11 December 1987
- Running time: 79 minutes
- Country: France
- Language: French
- Budget: $5.5 million
- Box office: $370,698

Gandahar is a 1987 French animated science fantasy film written and directed by René Laloux, based on Jean-Pierre Andrevon's 1969 novel Les Hommes-machines contre Gandahar (The Machine-Men versus Gandahar).

== Plot ==
The peaceful people of Gandahar are suddenly attacked by an army of automata known as the Men of Metal, who march through the villages and kidnap their victims by turning them to stone. The resulting statues are collected and then transferred to their base. At the capital city of Jasper, the Council of Women orders Sylvain to investigate. On his journey, he encounters the Deformed, a race of mutant beings who were accidentally created via genetic experimentation by Gandahar's scientists. Despite their resentment, they are also threatened by the Men of Metal and offer to help Sylvain.

Sylvain later saves Airelle, a Gandaharian woman. Together, they discover the Men of Metal's base, where the frozen Gandaharians are taken through a large portal and are seemingly assimilated into more Men of Metal. The two stow away on a nearby boat, which heads towards the middle of the ocean, where they encounter Metamorphis, a giant brain. Sylvain and Airelle are captured and confronted by Metamorphis, who tells them that although the Men of Metal believe that he is their leader, he did not create them nor order their attack. He states that he does not want to see Gandahar fall, and that he needs time to figure out the connection between him and the Men of Metal. He then returns Sylvain and Airelle to Jasper, where they learn that Metamorphis, like the Deformed, was also an experiment by Gandaharian scientists. He was abandoned in the ocean due to his rapid growth and increasingly violent behavior. Sylvain is ordered to kill Metamorphis with a special syringe. Sylvain returns to Metamorphis, who maintains his innocence but reveals that the Men of Metal come from the future via the portal Sylvain saw earlier. He then urges Sylvain to kill him in a thousand years, as the syringe would have no effect on him now. A skeptical Sylvain agrees, and Metamorphis puts him into stasis.

A thousand years later, Sylvain awakens just as they had agreed. He comes across the Deformed, who explain the true nature behind the Men of Metal: Due to Metamorphis's now advanced age, his cells can no longer regenerate, which drove him to create the Men of Metal and order them to go back in time to capture the Gandaharians so he could absorb their cells to continue living, killing the Gandaharians in the process. The metal comes from Metamorphis's dead cells metallizing with time. The Deformed, however, were abandoned as they were considered undesirable. Sylvain and the Deformed then agree to work together. The Deformed fight off the Men of Metal and rescue the remaining Gandaharians while Sylvain goes to face Metamorphis alone. The Deformed destroy the reservoir supplying Metamorphis with new cells, distracting him long enough to let Sylvain inject the syringe into Metamorphis, which kills him. Sylvain, along with the Deformed and the Gandaharians escape through the portal back to their time.

== Cast ==
Character	Original	English
Sylvain	Pierre-Marie Escourrou	John Shea
Airelle	Catherine Chevallier	Jennifer Grey
shapeshifter/Metamorphis	Georges Wilson	Christopher Plummer
Ambisextra	Anny Duperey	Glenn Close
Blaminhor/Blaminhoe	Jean-Pierre Ducos	Earl Hammond
Spokesman/Council Spokeswoman	Christine Paris	Sheila McCarthy

=== Additional Voices ===
- Original: Zaïra Benbadis (Recorded Voice), Claude Degliame (Recorded Voice), Olivier Cruveiller (Man-metal), Jean-Pierre Jorris (process), Dominique Collignon-Maurin (process), Jean-Jacques Scheffer (process), Jean Saudray (process), Frédéric Witta (process), Philippe Noël (process), Philippe Duclos (process), Joël Barbouth (process), Michel Charrel (process), Roland Lacoste (process)
- English: Alexander Marshall (Apod, The Metal Man), Paul Shaffer (Optiflow), Earle Hyman (Maxum), Raymond Joseph Teller (Octum), Penn Jillette (Chief of the Deformed), Earle Hyman (Chief of the Deformed), Dennis Predovic (The Head, The Metal Man), Bridget Fonda (The Head, Historian), Chip Bolcik (The Head, The Metal Man), Sheila McCarthy (The Head), David Johansen (Shayol), Terrence Mann (The Collective Voice), Kevin O'Rourke (The Metal Man), Ray Owens (The Metal Man), Jill Haworth (Announcer), Jennifer Grey (Airelle), Charles Busch (Gemnen) and Glenn Close as Ambisextra.

== Production ==
The animation was in colour and ran for 83 minutes. Production work was done by SEK Animation Studio of North Korea. The film is notable for its strange scenery and exotic flora, fauna, and bizarre inhabitants. The design was by the French comic book artist Caza.

=== English-language version ===
A slightly altered English-language version credits Harvey Weinstein as director and Bob Weinstein as producer. It was released in 1988 through Miramax Films, with the translation revised by noted science fiction author Isaac Asimov. The English title Light Years is not a translation of the original title, but rather of the original tagline "Les Années lumière" ("The Light Years") as seen on the French poster.

- The English version does not contain most of Yared's soundtrack for the original version of the film. New music created by the combined efforts of Jack Maeby, Bob Jewitt and Jim Klein was produced for certain sequences in the English-language version.
- The scene late in the original version of the film in which Airelle and Sylvain are in the nest was cut for sexual content. In the uncut version, Sylvain is shown removing his shirt, later, he and Airelle are shown lying nude in the nest at night, seemingly after having been intimate with one another.

== Availability ==
A European DVD release, in French with English subtitles, was released in October 2007 by Eureka!'s Masters of Cinema label. Though there are currently no plans for a Region 1 DVD release, a Region 0 Korean DVD version has been released.

As of October 2024, a 4:3 English dub can be viewed on the Amazon Prime streaming subscription service. The English voice cast is the default audio for the streaming video, and there is no alternative (French) language track and no attributes for remastering or transfer found in the credits.

It is also available on Tubi the free streaming service.

On 17 July 2026, Janus Films announced that a 4K restoration of the original cut with the French-language cast would be re-released theatrically on 28 August 2026.
