= Nathalie Henneberg =

French science fiction writer

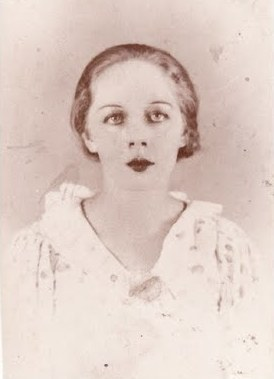
Nathalie Henneberg 1930s (likely)

Nathalie Henneberg (23 October 1910, in Batumi – 24 June 1977, in Paris) was a French science fiction writer, a precursor of modern French heroic fantasy. She was married to, and collaborated with, Charles Henneberg zu Irmelshausen Wasungen (1899–1959).

== Literary biography ==
Henneberg got her start writing with her husband, apparently collaborating without attribution on several of his novels. German-born Charles Henneberg wrote a series of flamboyant space operas featuring superheroic protagonists, often soldiers or mercenaries, full of violent, romantic passions. La Naissance des Dieux [The Birth Of The Gods] (1954) adapted Greek and Nordic mythologies in a science fiction context. In it, a scientist, an astronaut and a poet stranded on another planet discover they can psychically create life and, eventually, vie for supremacy. In accordance with Henneberg's philosophy, the astronaut was the hero, and the poet the misguided villain. The novel won the then Rosny Award.

Le Chant des Astronautes [The Astronauts' Song] (1958) dealt with the battle against energy creatures from Algol. An Premier, Ere Spatiale [Year 1 Of The Space Era] (1959) was about the first faster-than-light spaceship. Finally, La Rosée du Soleil [The Dew Of The Sun] (1959) told the adventures of the four crewmen of a spaceship stranded on an alien world.

After Charles Henneberg's death in 1959, Russian-born Nathalie Henneberg continued to work on writing, now under her own name. She initially wrote under the name Nathalie-Charles Henneberg, eventually dropping "-Charles" in favor of simply "Nathalie Henneberg." Her writings in her own name increasingly relied on fantasy rather than science fiction elements.

Les Dieux Verts [The Green Gods] (1961) told the romance of Argo and Atlena during the Emerald Age of Earth, in the future, when Man's Empire is on the decline and the world is ruled by the eponymous “Green Gods”, powerful entities from the vegetal kingdom.

Le Sang des Astres [The Blood Of The Stars] (1963) was a colorful fantasy in which an astronaut from the year 2700 journeys to a medieval Earth-like world ruled by kabbalah, and falls in love with a female salamander.

Nathalie Henneberg's masterpiece was La Plaie [The Plague] (1964), a sprawling 600-page novel that told of the desperate battle by a handful of humans and angel-like mutants against a wave of pure evil sweeping the galaxy, which incarnates itself in the bodies of the “Nocturnes” [Nocturnals].

Henneberg's works stood alone in the literary landscape of the 1960s. Her use of the French language, betraying Germanic and Russian influences, was unusually well-suited to creating larger-than-life heroic characters and epic romances. She knew how to build full-blown, intricately detailed baroque universes.

== Bibliography ==
- La Naissance des Dieux [The Birth Of The Gods] (by CH, 1954; rev. by NH, 1977)
- Le Chant des Astronautes [The Astronauts' Song] (by CH, 1958; rev. by NH, 1975)
- An Premier, Ere Spatiale [Year 1 Of The Space Era] (by CH, 1959; rev. by NH as Le Mur de la Lumière [The Light Barrier], 1972)
- La Rosée du Soleil [The Dew Of The Sun] (by CH, 1959)
- Les Dieux Verts (by CH & NH, 1961; rev. by NH, 1975; translated by C. J. Cherryh as The Green Gods, 1980, Daw Books)
- La Forteresse Perdue [The Lost Fortress] (by NH, 1962)
- Le Sang des Astres [The Blood Of The Stars] (by NH, 1963; rev. 1976)
- La Plaie [The Plague] (by NH, 1964; rev. 1974)
- L'Opale Entydre [The Entydre Opal] (by NH, 1971)
- Le Dieu Foudroyé [The Thunderstruck God] (by NH, 1976)
- Démons et Chimères [Demons And Chimeras] (by NH, 1977)
- D'Or et de Nuit [Of Gold And Night] (by NH, 1977)
- Les Anges de la Colère [The Angels Of Wrath] (by NH, 1978)
- Kheroub des Étoiles (by NH, published in Galaxies n° 37 & 38, 2015)
