= Bernard Quiriny =

Belgian writer and literary critic

Bernard Quiriny (French: [kiʁini]; born 27 June 1978, Bastogne) is a Belgian writer and literary critic. He is also a professor of public law at the University of Burgundy, having published numerous scholarly articles in the legal field since receiving his doctoral dissertation in 2005. In addition, he works a staff writer and head of the literature column for the cultural magazine Chronic'art.

== Literary works ==
Quiriny is best known for his collections of fantastic short stories (L'Angoisse de la première phrase, Contes carnivores, Une collection très particulière). All three feature a recurrent character, Pierre Gould, described as "eccentric", a "poet, dandy, book-lover, just a bit of a misanthrope". These stories have often led to comparisons with other writers such as Jorge Luis Borges, especially because of their inclusion of twists and fantastic or horrific elements.

In 2010, Quiriny published his first novel, Les assoiffées, which depicts modern Belgium as a closed, totalitarian government run by radical feminists, similar to North Korea in that little is known about what happens in Belgium in the outside world. The story follows Pierre Gould who, accompanied by a group of hand-picked journalists, is the first man to be receive permission to visit Belgium since the violent 1970 revolution.

His latest work, Monsieur Spleen, is a biography of the symbolist poet Henri de Régnier, an author today largely unknown in modern literary circles. Although biographical, the tone of the work is situated between that of a novel and a historical account, characterised by the use of irony and humour.

== Awards ==
Bernard Quiriny's second collection of short stories, Contes carnivores, received the Prix du Style and the Prix Victor Rossel.

In 2013, his book Une collection très particulière was awarded the Grand Prix de l'Imaginaire for best French-language short stories.

== Bibliography ==
- L'Angoisse de la première phrase (2005)
- Contes carnivores (2008)
- Les assoiffées (2010)
- Une collection très particulière (2012)
- Monsieur Spleen: Notes sur Henri De Régnier (2013)
