= Joseph Altairac =

French literary critic and essayist (1957–2020)

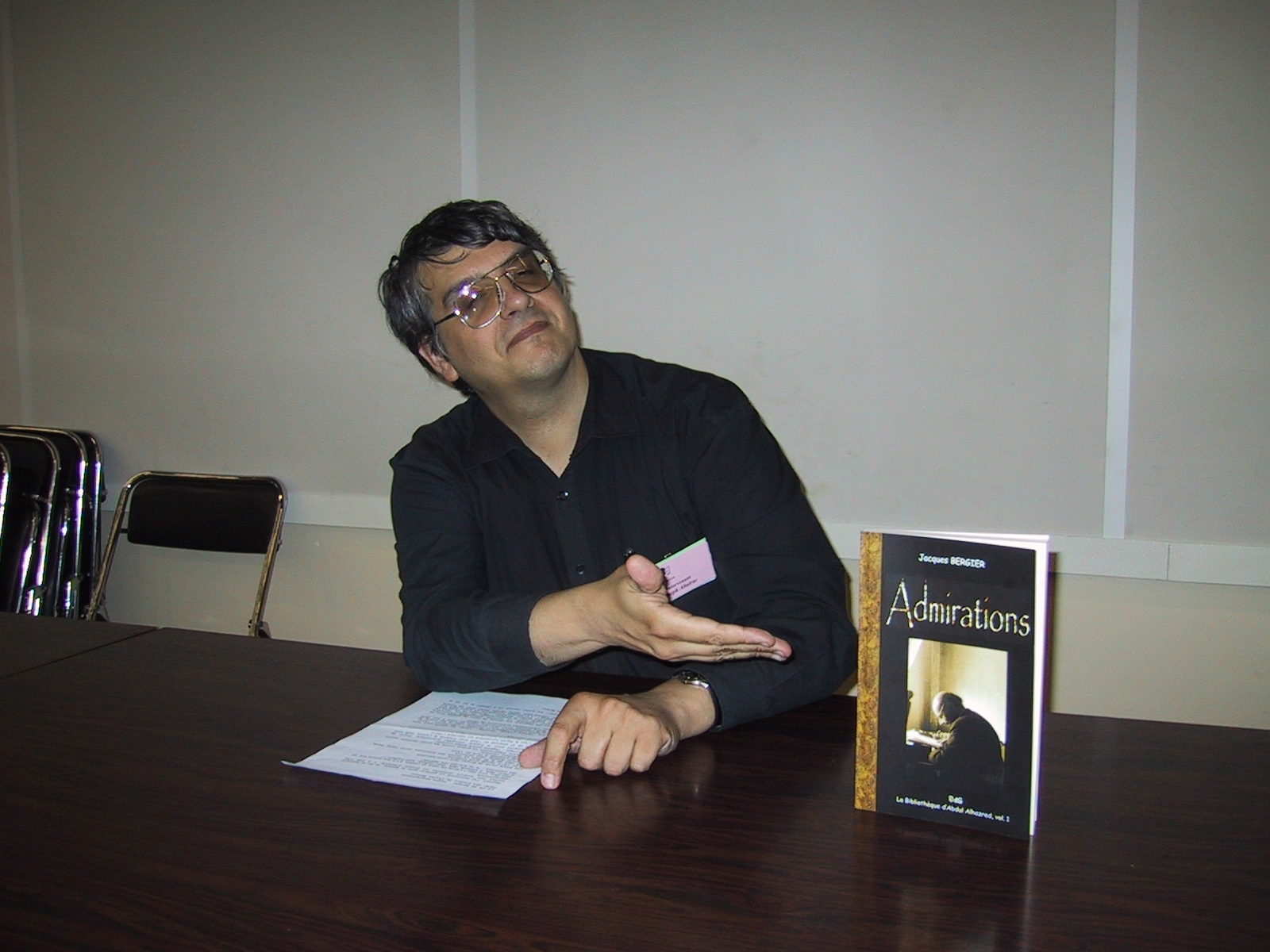
- Altairac in 2001
- Born: 25 March 1957; France
- Died: 9 November 2020 (aged 63); Paris, France
- Occupations: Literary Critic; Essayist

Joseph Altairac (25 March 1957 – 9 November 2020) was a French literary critic and essayist.

== Career ==
He specialized in science fiction literature and served as secretary of the Prix Rosny-Aîné. His articles and works were largely dedicated to A. E. van Vogt, H. P. Lovecraft, and H. G. Wells. He also studied subterranean fiction and the history of science fiction in France.

During the 1990s, Altairac published the journal Études lovecraftiennes, a French language equivalent of the American Lovecraft Studies, which led him to direct the "Cahiers d'études lovecraftiennes" at Éditions Encrage.

== Publications ==
- "Cahiers d'études lovecraftiennes" (series)
- Herbert George Wells : parcours d'une œuvre (1998)
- Alfred E. Van Vogt : parcours d'une œuvre (2000)
- Les Terres creuses : bibliographie commentée des mondes souterrains imaginaires (2006)
- Rétrofictions : encyclopédie de la conjecture romanesque rationnelle francophone, de Rabelais à Barjavel, 1532-1951 (2018)
