= Alain Damasio =

French writer of sci-fi and fantasy

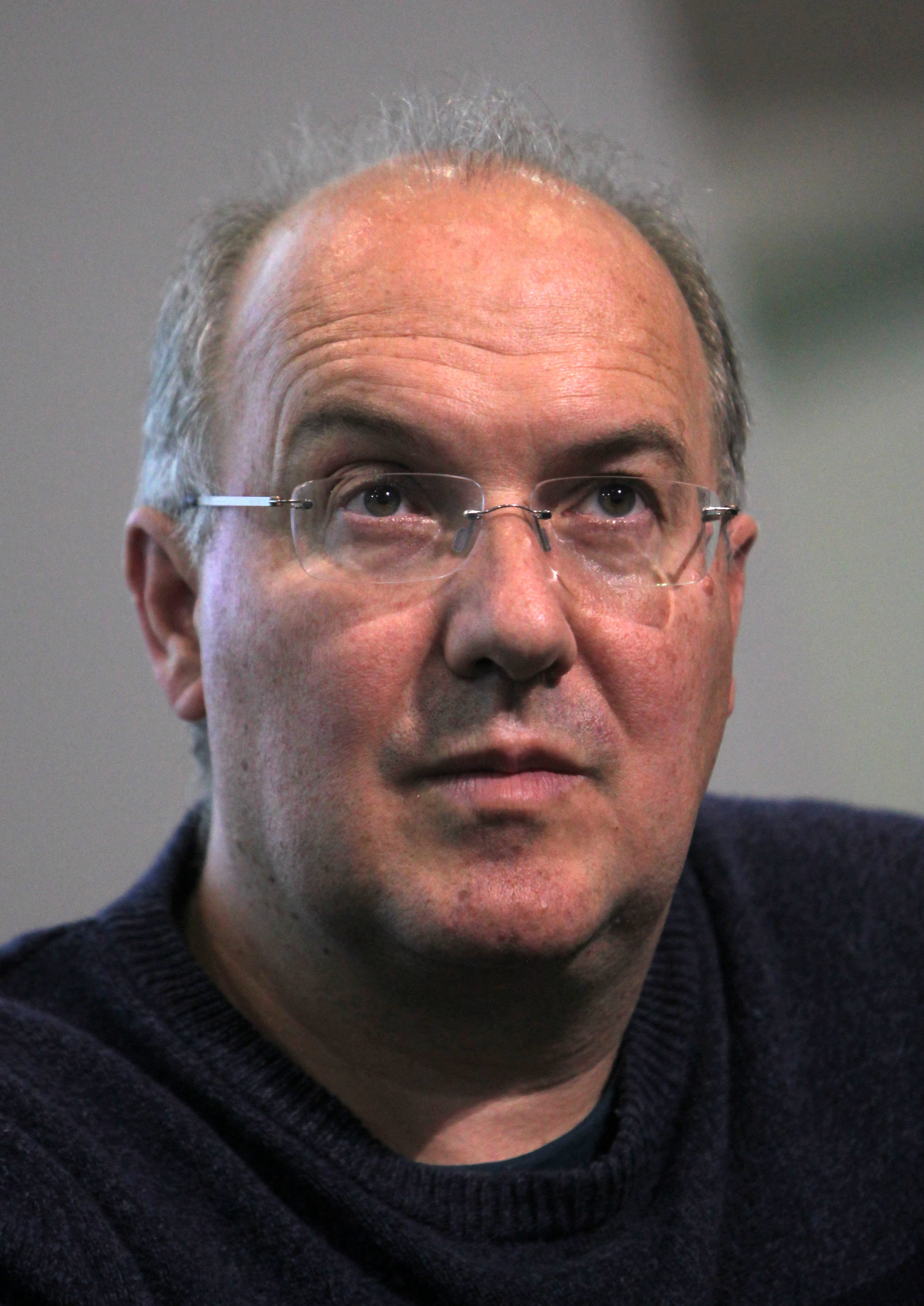
- Alain Damasio, in 2019
- Born: Alain Raymond; 1 August 1969 (age 57); Lyon, France
- Occupations: Writer, scriptwriter
- Writing career
- Genre: Science fiction

Alain Damasio (born Alain Raymond, 1 August 1969) is a French writer of sci-fi and fantasy. He also works as a scriptwriter for comics, radio fictions, movie and TV series. He is also notable as an audio and spoken word artist.

== Biography ==
Alain Damasio was born in Lyon. His father was a self-employed car body repairperson, while his mother was an agrégée English teacher. Alain Damasio graduated from high school with a specialization in science. He then passed the entrance exam for ESSEC Business School, one of France's top business schools, that he left in 1991 without graduating. He then embarked on two solitary retreats to write, residing first in Vercors (France) and then in Nonza (Corsica, France). His works have focused heavily on futuristic politics and incorporate significant science fiction and fantasy elements.

As a young man he wrote many short stories. His first longform fictional work was La Zone du Dehors (The Outer Zone), a futuristic novel dealing with a model of society under control on a democratic model (inspired by the works of Michel Foucault and Gilles Deleuze).

His second novel was rewarded with the Grand Prize of Imaginary Writing (Grand Prix de l'Imaginaire) in 2006, in the works of fiction category: La Horde du Contrevent (The Horde of Counterwind). This novel comes with a soundtrack composed by Arno Alyvan. It was a great success and sold 120,000 copies; this book is regularly quoted as a must-read of French fantasy books.

In 2008, he lent his voice to Bora, a piece of music by Rone.

In 2009, he wrote La Rage du Sage (The Wise Man Wrath or Sage Rage), a poetic and political essay on our times, for the free single of the group Sliver.

Alain Damasio also wrote the script of WindWalkers, an animation film taken from La Horde du Contrevent with Jan Kounen as director and Marc Caro as art director. The project was abandoned due to a lack of funding.

In 2019, he published Les Furtifs (The Stealthies), his most recent novel which was also rewarded by the Grand Prize of Imaginary Writing. In collaboration with the composer Yan Péchin, he has developed a musical environment based on this novel in an album called Entrer dans la couleur.

== Works ==
=== Collected short stories ===
- Aucun Souvenir Assez Solide (No Strong Memories) La Volte, 2012

=== Short stories ===
- Les Aiguilleurs du ciel (Air Traffic Controllers), in Onze pour Mille (One out of a Thousand), Cylibris, 2000
- El Levir et le Livre (El Koob and the book) in Libelle, pub. In DESS of the Sorbonne, 2001
- Les Hauts Parleurs, (The Loud Speakers) in (Another globalization in progress, Mango (Regard sur demain), 2002 (with Karen Bastien et Philippe Arnaud)
- Aucun souvenir assez solide, in Galaxies, #38, 2005
- So phare away, in Galaxies, #42, 2007
- Le Bruit des bagues, (The Ringing rings) in L'Expansion, #723, 2007
- Définitivement, (Definitely) in Appel d'air, Les Trois souhaits, 2007
- Disparitions, in Apple d'air, Les Trois Souhaits, 2007
- Dual universe, 2016

=== Novels ===
- La Zone du Dehors (The Outer Zone), Cylibris, 1999
- La Horde du Contrevent (The Horde of Counterwind), La Volte, 2004 (Folio SF, 2007 paperback)
- La Zone du Dehors, new version, La Volte, 2007 (Folio SF, 2009 paperback)
- Les Furtifs (The Stealthies), La Volte, 2019
- Vallée du Silicium, Albertine/Seuil, 2024

=== Other written works ===
- Sociétés de contrôle et cinéma, (societies under control and cinema), on the site of La Zone du Dehors
- Appel d'air contre la narcose Sarkozy (An In-draught against Sarkozy narcosis) on the site of La Zone du dehors, 2007
- La Rage du sage (TheWiseman Wrath) in Memento Mori, 2009 (with SLIVER)

=== Video games ===
Alain Damasio is co-founder of Dontnod Entertainment (2008) with Aleksi Briclot, Hervé Bonin, Jean Maxime Moris and Oscar Guilbert. He was director of the narrative department from 2008 to 2010, then he committed this job to Stéphane Beauverger to dedicate himself to his next projects Les Furtifs and Fusion. He has written the first two narrative bibles of the AAA game Remember Me (narrative universe, themes and characters’ profile) before directing a writing workshop of seven people so as to complete the bible of a thousand pages and the first version of the script. Remember Me was published in June 2013 and sold 2.1 million copies. Remember Me was awarded the prize of the best script at the Paris Games Awards.

In 2022, Alain Damasio is also one of the six writers of Cross The Ages: The Chrome Spell Book. Those books are the spine of the digital collectible card game Cross The Ages: TCG.

=== Audio creations ===
Alain Damasio is particularly interested in the music of words and in the potential of sound as language. He worked repeatedly on sound versions of his texts but also created a soundwalk: La Sansouïre.

- The Chrones, audio adaptation of several texts from La Horde du Contrevent (The Wind Walkers) (Voice: Alain Damasio - Radio adaptation: Floriane Pochon, with Tony Regnauld) which was rewarded by le Prix du Coup de Cœur du Jury (jury favourite) at the Radiophonies Festival 2012.
- La Sansouïre (from the unpublished text by Alain Damasio - adapted for radio by Floriane Pochon and Tony Regnauld). An audio walk on Napoleon beach at Port-St-Louis-du-Rhône, created when Alain Damasio was a guest on Radio Grenouille for Marseille-Provence in 2013.
- Since September 2013 Alain Damasio has lent his voice and his pen to several jingles on the web radio Phaune Radio.
- In 2014, Alain Damasio started Phonophore with sound directors Floriane Pochon and Tony Regnauld, an audio version of his fiction Les Furtifs (The Stealthies), a composition of 42 audio items (portraits and sonorous landscapes, political cartridges, docufictions...) the project was awarded a grant by the foundation Beaumarchais-Orange in May 2014.
- Fragments Hackés d'un futur qui résiste (Hacked fragments of a tough future) is a piece which was originally created for the 2014 version of the Festival des Libertés (Festival of Freedoms) at the National Theatre in Brussels (Belgium) from a scenario by Alain Damasio and audio accompaniment by the studio of art sounds Tarabust and Phaune Radio.
- In 2021, he created a "slam" (musical poem) in support of the "ZAD de la colline" to music by Laurent Pernice.

== Collaborations ==
- In 2008, Rone used Alain Damasio's voice for his song Bora Vocal (in Bora EP, In Finé/Discograph, minimal techno genre. It consists of extracts from Alain Damasio's diary when he was working on La Horde du Contrevent.)
- In 2009, he wrote La Rage du Sage for the free single Memento Mori, by the group SLIVER (Winged Skull Records/we are all liars records).
- In 2011, he appeared in an on-line documentary INSITU by Antoine Viviani. The video was shot in the La Défense neighborhood in Paris, and he talked about how he related to urban space. In the film, his voice resounds in the mall Les Quatre Temps, then he alludes to his work in les Clameurs (Clamours) in La Zone du Dehors (The Outer Zone).
- In 2020 he participated in the French documentary Un pays qui se tient sage about police violence and the handling of the "Gilets Jaunes" movement.

== Conferences ==
- In 2009, Alain Damasio gave an hour-long lecture on L'homme qui prenait sa femme pour un clavier ou l'anthropotechnique à l'épreuve de la pire des science-fictions (The man who took his wife for a keyboard or anthropotechnology put to the test of the worst sci-fi : when it starts asking questions) about man–machine interaction, at IHM 2009, a conference in French on man-machine interaction.
- Conférence Convention 2010: Societies under control and Liberty.
- In 2010 he was a guest at the Festival of fantasy Worlds Les Imaginales in Epinal where he lectured about his work as a writer.
- In 2012 Alain Damasio took part in several conferences organized by the Festival de L'Imaginaire Grenoblois Rêves d'Ailleurs (Grenoble Fantasy festival, Dreams from Abroad) (http://lesrevailleurs.fr) in Grenoble on the following themes: Dystopies et nouvelles technologies et Invasion, le zombie comme figure de l'Autre. Dystopias and new technologies and Invasion, the zombie as the Other.
- Since 2010 he has been a regular guest in Nantes for the Utopiales where he has taken part in numerous conferences. In 2010: Les Réseaux, un monde sans frontières ? (The Networks, a world without borders?) and Nanotechnologies at the limit point of the infinitesimally small. In 2012, De l'écriture au scénario (from novel writing to scenario writing), Science-fiction et jeu vidéo, (sci-fi and video game), Une technologie de l'invisible (Technology of the invisible). In 2013, Citoyens du futur (Citizens of the future), Interface cerveau-machine (brain-machine interface) and the conference: Philosophie et jeu video (Philosophy and video games).
- In 2014, Alain Damasio lectured at TEDx Paris at the Châtelet Theâtre in Paris "Très Humain plutôt que transhumain ?" ("Very Human rather than Transhuman")

Soundtracks and videos of his numerous conferences are available on the ActuSF website.

== Literary prizes ==
- Special Elbakin prize 2014 for La Horde du Contrevent
- Grand Prix de l'Imaginaire in the French novel category (Grand Prize for Fantasy) for La Horde du Contrevent 2006
- Prix Imaginales des lycées (High school students' prize) 2006 for La Horde du Contrevent
- European Utopiales Prize 2007 for La Zone du dehors (The Outer Zone ).

== Other prizes ==
- SACD (French authors' organization) prize for digital Creation 2014 for Remember Me and the whole of his digital creation

== La Volte ==
- Alain Damasio's books have the distinctive feature of not being just books but books and objects: one edition of The Outer Zone comes with a DVD of a short film, animations in 3D and other bonuses to enhance one's reading experience; La Horde du Contrevent (The Horde of Counterwind) comes with A BOL (a book sound track) composed by musician Arno Alyvan.
- There also exists a special prestige edition of La Horde du Contrevent, signed and numbered with the sound track, a DVD featuring unreleased interviews of the author, recorded by his brother, film director Bruno Raymond-Damasio (although the paperback edition is sold with no soundtrack).

== Bibliography ==
- Olivier Noël, Alain Damasio, le Vif du sujet (The heart of the matter ), in Galaxies, n° 42, 2007.
- Stéphane Martin, Colin Pahlish, La croisée des souffles, La Horde du Contrevent d'Alain Damasio (Crossroads of breaths, The Horde of Counterwind) in Archipel Essais, n° 18 Lausanne, 2013.

== Decorations ==
- Chevalier of the Order of Arts and Letters (2016)
