= François Coupry =

French writer (born 1947)

François Coupry (19 July 1947, Hyères) is a French writer.

== Biography ==
After studying philosophy, he was a literary journalist, publisher and editor-in-chief of the magazine Roman (1982–1989), while occupying institutional posts: first director of the Maison des écrivains (1984–1986), president of the Société des gens de lettres (1996–2000), president and co-manager of SOFIA, "Société française des auteurs de l’écrit" (2001–2005, then 2010–2013).

An essayist, storyteller and novelist, he has published some thirty stories in the genre Marvelous, where the world is told from an "abnormal", "inhuman" point of view, and where the ordinary laws and principles of physics have been recreated. His paradoxes and fables question "the role of the creative fiction of reality."

== Works ==
- 1970: La Promenade cassée
- 1971: Les Autocoincés, Éditions Gallimard
- 1975: Mille pattes sans tête, éditions Jean-Edern Hallier
- 1976: L'Anti-éditeur, Hallier
- 1977: Écrire c'est vendre : esquisse d'une économie politique de la littérature, Hallier
- 1978: Je suis lesbien, Balland
- 1978: Ventre bleu, Balland
- 1980: Les Italiens d'aujourd’hui, Balland
- 1980: La Terre ne tourne pas autour du Soleil, Gallimard
- 1981: Le Bonheur est une idée neuve en France : mai 1968-mai 1981, Megrelis
- 1981: Torero d'or, with Catherine Clément, Hachette, Paris, reprint Robert Laffont 1992, ISBN 2221073924
- 1983: La Vie ordinaire des anges, Robert Laffont
- 1984: Le Rire du pharaon, Robert Laffont
- 1985: La Récréation du monde, Robert Laffont
- 1986: L'Imperméable vert, Bayard-presse
- 1987: Avec David Bloom dans le rôle de David Bloom, Robert Laffont
- 1989: Éloge du gros dans un monde sans consistance, Robert Laffont
- 1991: L'Énorme tragédie du rêve, Robert Laffont
- 1992: Le Fils du concierge de l’Opéra, Gallimard
- 1993: Les Contes du cavalier chinois, Robert Laffont
- 1993: L'Enfant qui lisait dans le ciel, Robert Laffont
- 1994: Monsieur l'archéologue, Gallimard
- 1994: Eugène Ionesco, Julliard
- 1997: La Corrida, Éditions Milan
- 1989: Faust et Antigone, Presses de la Renaissance
- 1982: Jour de chance, Presses de la Renaissance
- 1989: Une journée d'Hélène Larrivière, Presses de la Renaissance
- 1999: Abrico amoureux, Zulma
- 1999: Les Gitans, Milan
- 2000: L'Œil du gitan, éditions du Rocher
- 2000: Toros de mort, éditions du Rocher
- 2000: La Maison dans le Caniveau, Le Rocher
- 2005: Les trois Coups du cavalier chinois, le Rocher
- 2006: Zeus et la Bêtise humaine, Le Rocher
- 2008: Les Souterrains de l'Histoire, édition d’ensemble resserrée et recomposée (including a reworked version of La Vie ordinaire des Anges), Le Rocher
- 2011: Où est le vrai Louis XVI ?, Alphée
