= Jean-Pierre Andrevon =

French science fiction author

Jean-Pierre Andrevon (born 19 September 1937 in Bourgoin-Jallieu, Isère) is a French science fiction author, as well as a painter and singer. He has used the pseudonym Alphonse Brutsche for novels published under the Fleuve Noir label. In addition to his regular authorship, he has written scenarios for several prominent comics artists, among others Georges Pichard and Caza, resulting in a body of comic book work. He has also edited a number of anthologies of French science fiction.

== Works by Andrevon ==
- Les hommes-machines contre Gandahar (The Machine-Men versus Gandahar) (1969). Film: Gandahar (1987)
- Aujourd'hui, demain et après (1970) (collection of short fiction)
- Le temps des grandes chasses (1973)
- Le Temps cyclothymique (1974)
- Le Désert du monde (1977)
- Neutron (1980) (collection of short fiction)
- Cauchemars de sang (1986)
- Sous le regard des étoiles (1989)
- Visiteurs d'apocalypse (1990)
- C'est un peu la guerre, c'est un peu la paix (La Clef d'Argent, 2009)

== Anthologies edited by Andrevon ==
- Retour à la Terre (1975)
- Retour à la Terre 2 (1976)
