= Ruellan brothers =

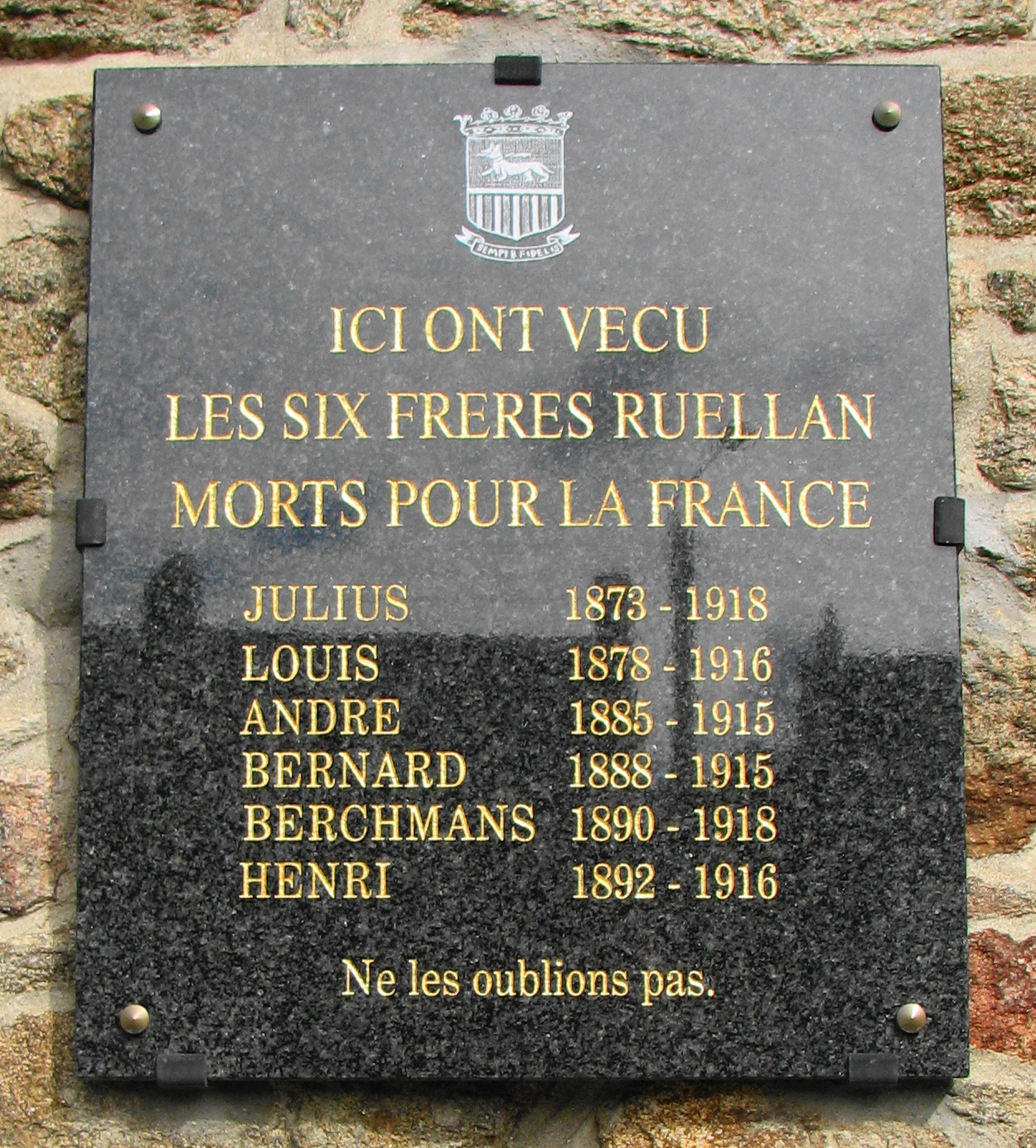
Plaque on the former Ruellan family house (today a library)

The Ruellan brothers (in French les frères Ruellan) were French siblings from Paramé (now included in Saint-Malo), Brittany, who fought during the First World War. Ten brothers, from a family of thirteen children, were on the front lines. Six were killed in action, setting the record for the highest number of French siblings killed during World War I. A seventh brother, who had been exposed to a chemical agent during the war, died a few years later of his injuries.
