= Olivier Paquet =

French writer and political scientist

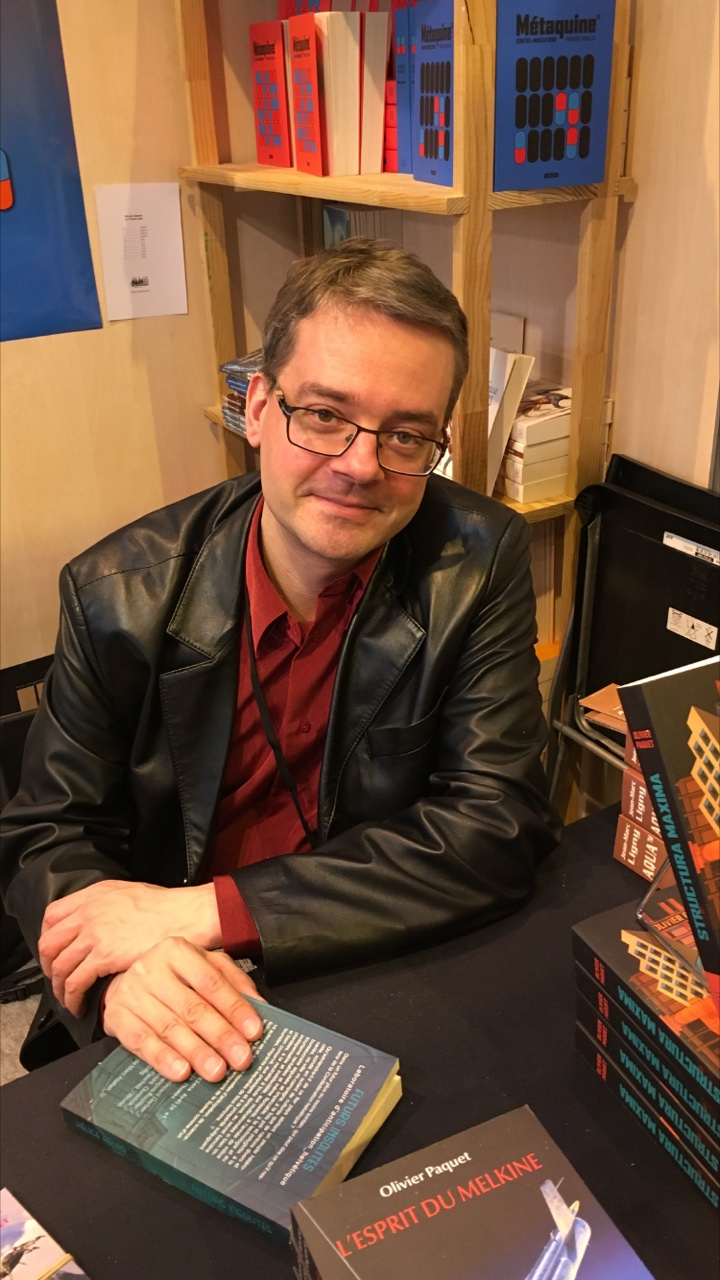
Olivier Paquet in Paris, 2016.

Olivier Paquet (born 21 April 1973) is a French political scientist and science fiction author.

Paquet graduated from the Institut d'études politiques de Grenoble in 1994 and went on to complete his DEA in 1995. He completed a doctorate in political science at the institution in 2002. As an author, he won the Grand Prix de l'Imaginaire award in 2002 for his short fiction Synesthésie, which was published in Galaxies (magazine)|Galaxies magazine in 2000. His novel L’Esprit du Melkine won the science-fiction award in 2014. He is also a columnist for the France Culture radio station and an anime and manga critic.

== Biography ==
After graduating from the Grenoble Institute of Political Studies in 1994, Olivier Paquet successfully defended his thesis in 2002 at the same institution and became a doctor of political science. His thesis was entitled Czechoslovak Democracy and Its National Problems, 1918–1938. He also published several articles on Czech democracy in the early 20th century.

Passionate about science fiction, Japanese animation, and manga, Olivier Paquet has published several feature articles on these subjects, notably in the magazine Bang! published by Casterman. He has also been a contributor to the radio program Mauvais genres on France Culture since fall 2006, where he regularly writes columns on his favorite topics. He lives in Lyon.
