= Claude Izner =

Authors' pseudonym

Claude Izner is the pseudonym of Liliane Korb (born in 1940) and Laurence Lefèvre (born in 1951) who write the "Victor Legris" crime novels. Legris is a bookseller in late 19th-century Paris who is also an amateur detective. The books were originally bestsellers in France, and are now published in the UK by Gallic Books.

== Bibliography ==
- Mystère rue des Saints-Pères (Murder on the Eiffel Tower) (2003)
- La Disparue du Père-Lachaise (The Père-Lachaise Mystery) (2003)
- Le Carrefour des Écrasés (The Montmartre Investigation) (2003)
- Le Secret des Enfants-Rouges (The Marais Assassin) (2004)
- Le Léopard des Batignolles (The Predator of Batignolles, published in the United States as In the Shadows of Paris) (2005)
- Le Talisman de la Villette (Strangled in Paris) (2006)
- Rendez-vous passage d'Enfer (2008)
- La Momie de la Butte-aux-Cailles (2009)
- Le Petit Homme de l'Opéra (2010)
- Les Souliers bruns du quai Voltaire (2011)
- Minuit, impasse du Cadran (2012)
- Le Dragon du Trocadéro (2014)
