= Fiction (French magazine) =

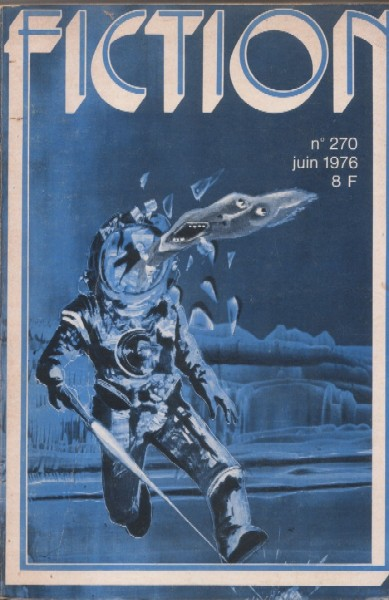
- Cover of issue 270 from June 1976, illustrated by Philippe Legendre-Kvater
- Editor: Alain Dorémieux
- Categories: Speculative fiction
- First issue: October 1953
- Final issue Number: 1990; 412
- Company: Éditions OPTA
- Country: France
- Based in: Paris
- Language: French
- ISSN: 0223-4742

Fiction was a French magazine on speculative fiction, in particular, fantasy and science fiction. First published in October 1953 by French publishing house Éditions OPTA, it was published until 1990 (issue 412). Initially was considered to be the French edition of The Magazine of Fantasy & Science Fiction and contained many translations from that magazine, but later it began to publish more independent content. Its principal editor was Alain Dorémieux.

The magazine was described in The Encyclopedia of Science Fiction, together with Galaxie as "for many years the principal outlet for US stories and a springboard for new French talents, including critics".
