= Catherine Dufour =

French writer

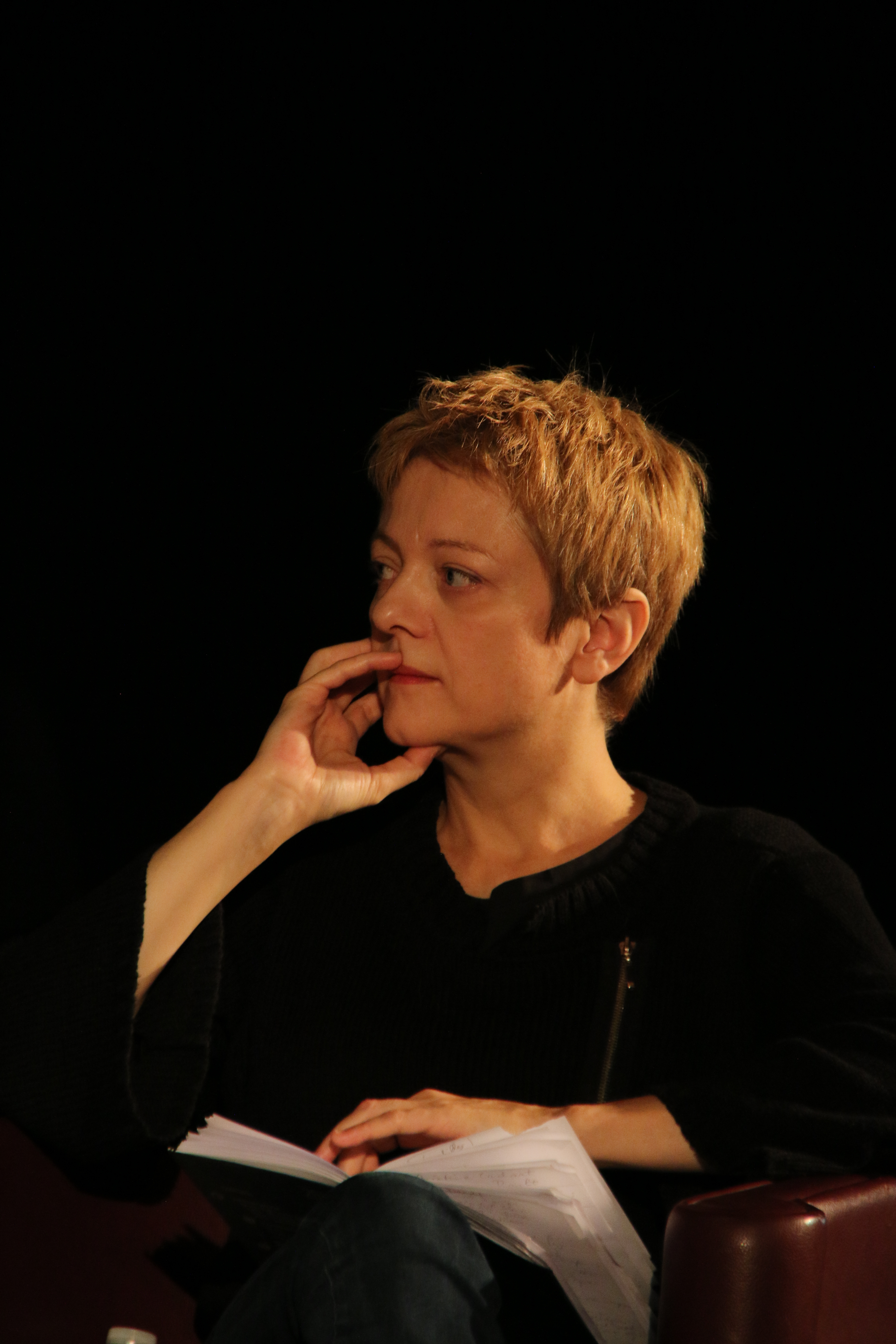
- Born: 1966 (age 59–60); Paris, France
- Occupations: writer, engineer
- Notable work: Le goût de l'immortalité

Catherine Dufour (born 1966) in Paris, is a French novelist, short story writer and computer scientist. She writes fantasy and science fiction.

She won the Merlin, Prix Rosny-aîné, Bob-Morane, Lundi and Masterton awards, as well as the Grand Prix de l'imaginaire. Along with other science fiction authors, she founded the Zanzibar collective to develop a common approach to ‘disincarcerating the future’.

== Biography ==
Catherine Dufour was born on 17 April 1966 in Paris. After obtaining her scientific baccalauréat, Catherine Dufour went on to study at HEC business school before working in the educational sector. The arrival of computer technologies for the general public in the mid-1990s prompted her to study computer science and become an engineer. She created digital libraries. Since 2014, she has been Head of Communications and Cultural Action at the University of Paris 8 library. She is also a lecturer at Sciences Po Paris.

Catherine Dufour wrote for Le Monde diplomatique, where she has notably produced an analysis of Fifty Shades of Grey as well as an article on the American author Ursula K. Le Guin and a more general one on science fiction.

She has also written prefaces to science fiction novels and short story collections such as Le diapason des mots et des misères by Jérôme Noirez, Women in Chains by Thomas Day (France) and Espaces insécables by Sylvie Lainé.

A connoisseur of the world of fantasy, she shared her readings during the La Méthode scientifique specials entitled ‘De la SF plein la valise’ in 2017, 2019 and 2021.

== Analysis of her works ==
Catherine Dufour wrote many short stories in the fantasy genre, such as L'accroissement mathématique du plaisir, which describes the extreme emotion one can feel when faced with a work of art, and L'Immaculée Conception, inspired by her experience of pregnancy and winner of the 2008 Grand Prix de l'Imaginaire.

From the 2000s onwards, her books tackled themes such as transhumanism, virtuality and genetic modification. Her novel Le Goût de l'immortalité won the Bob-Morane, Rosny aîné and Lundi awards in 2006 and the Grand prix de l'Imaginaire in 2007. The novel follows Cmatic, who investigates cases of a disease thought to have been eradicated a century ago, and meets a strange teenage girl. Catherine Dufour's writing is described as dense, precise and fluid, her humour as ferocious as it is disillusioned. This novel has established its author as a key figure on the French science fiction scene.

In 2009, she set her novel Outrage et rébellion in a world somewhat similar to that of Le goût de l'immortalité in 2320 Western China, to tell the story of Marquis, who invents angry music to unite the students of his boarding school against their supervisors. Here she used a much cruder style, inspired by the essay Please Kill Me - The Uncensored History of Punk by Legs McNeil and Gillian McCain.

In the Masterton Prize-winning fantasy novel Entends la nuit, published in 2018 and described as radical and original, Catherine Dufour tackled the theme of a powerful man falling in love with a woman of modest condition, in a story where suspense cohabits with sensuality.

Her two collections of short stories, L'Accroissement mathématique du plaisir (2008) and L'Arithmétique terrible de la misère (2020) confirmed her status as a benchmark writer, capable of expressing herself in all genres. The stories brought a new life into literature, with pessimistic texts and a caustic style offering a dark and desperate reading of the world. They also show the author's ability to appropriate worlds and works and reinterpret them in her own way, like Peter Pan, I am a Legend and Alice in Wonderland.

In 2020, she published Au bal des absents, described as a ‘fantastic thriller that virtuously combines gothic frights and ultra-contemporary anxieties’.

== Selected works ==
=== Novels ===
Dufour's books include:

- Quand les dieux buvaient
  - Blanche Neige et les lance-missiles (Prix Merlin 2002)
  - L'Ivresse des providers (2001)
  - Merlin l'Ange Chanteur (2003)
  - L'immortalité moins six minutes (2007)
  - Blanche Neige et les lance-missiles (Republishing and rewriting of the two first tomes in one paperback)
  - Blanche Neige contre Merlin l'enchanteur (Republishing and rewriting of the last two tomes in one paperback)
- Le Goût de l'immortalité (Prix Bob-Morane 2006, Prix Rosny-Aîné 2006, Prix du Lundi 2006, Grand Prix de l'Imaginaire 2007)
- Délires d'Orphée (2007)
- L'accroissement mathématique du plaisir (2008)
- Outrage et rébellion (2009)
- L'Histoire de France pour ceux qui n'aiment pas ça (2012)
- Le Guide des métiers pour les petites filles qui ne veulent pas finir princesses (2014)
- La vie sexuelle de Lorenzaccio (2014)
- Entends la nuit, 2018
- Danse avec les lutins (2019); winner of 2020 Prix Imaginales and Prix Bob-Morane

=== Short story ===
- L'immaculée conception (Grand Prix de l'Imaginaire 2008)
