= Francis Berthelot =

French science fiction writer

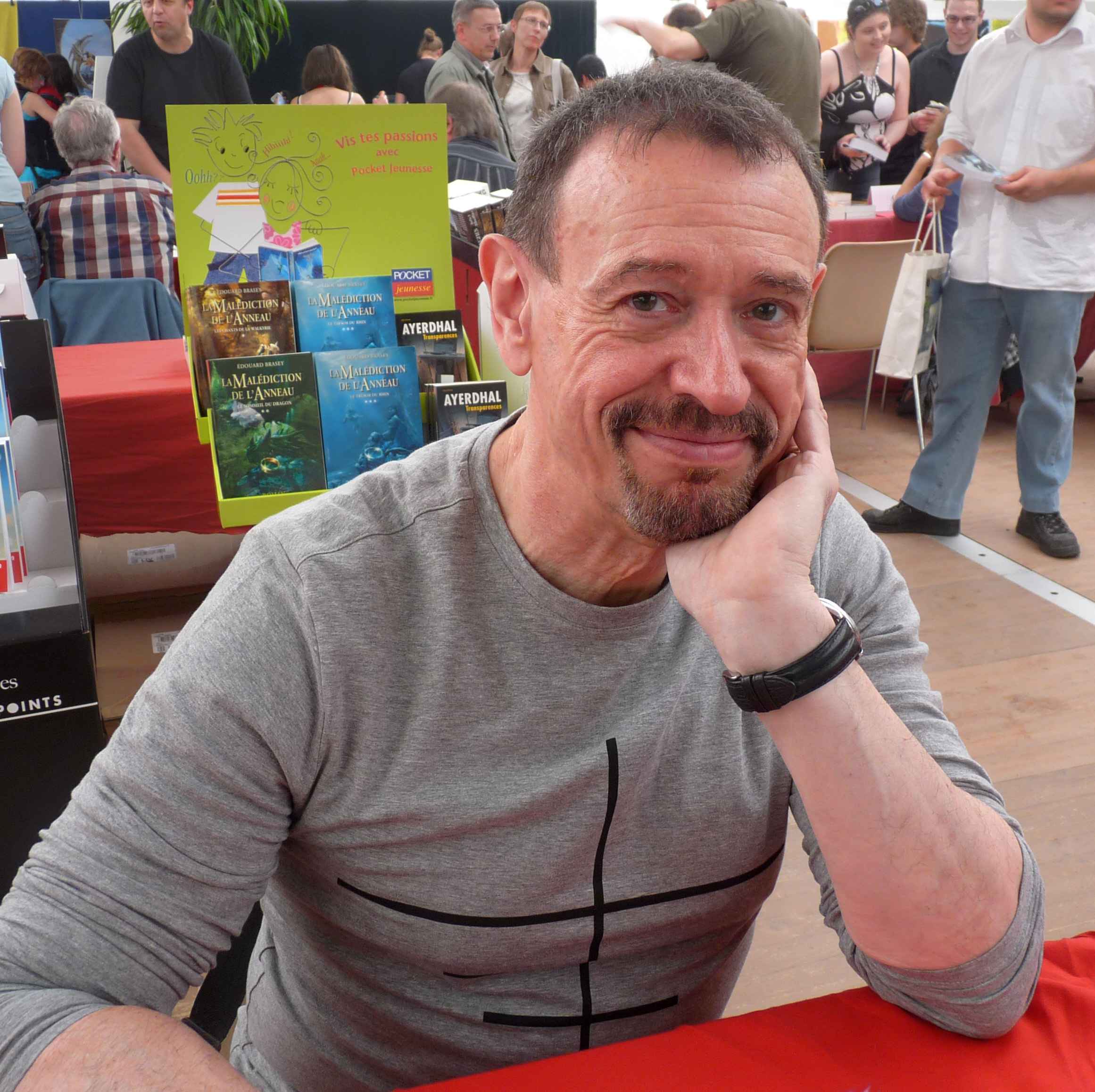
Francis Berthelot in 2010.

Francis Berthelot (French: [fʁɑ̃sis bɛʁtəlo]; born 27 July 1946 in Paris) is a French science fiction writer. He won the Grand Prix de l'Imaginaire three times and the Prix Rosny-Aîné once. He is an alumnus of École Polytechnique.

== Bibliography ==
=== Novels ===
- La Lune noire d'Orion 1980
- La Ville au fond de l’œil 1986
- Rivage des intouchables 1990
- La maison brisée 1999
- Le serpent à collerette 2003

=== Series/Cycles ===
Khanaor

1. Solstice de fer 1983
2. Equinoxe de cendre 1983

Le rêve du démiurge

1. L'ombre d'un soldat 1994
2. Le jongleur interrompu 1996
3. Mélusath 1999
4. Le jeu du cormoran 2001
5. Nuit de colère 2003
6. Hadès Palace 2005
7. Le Petit Cabaret des morts
