= Michel Jeury =

French writer (1934–2015)

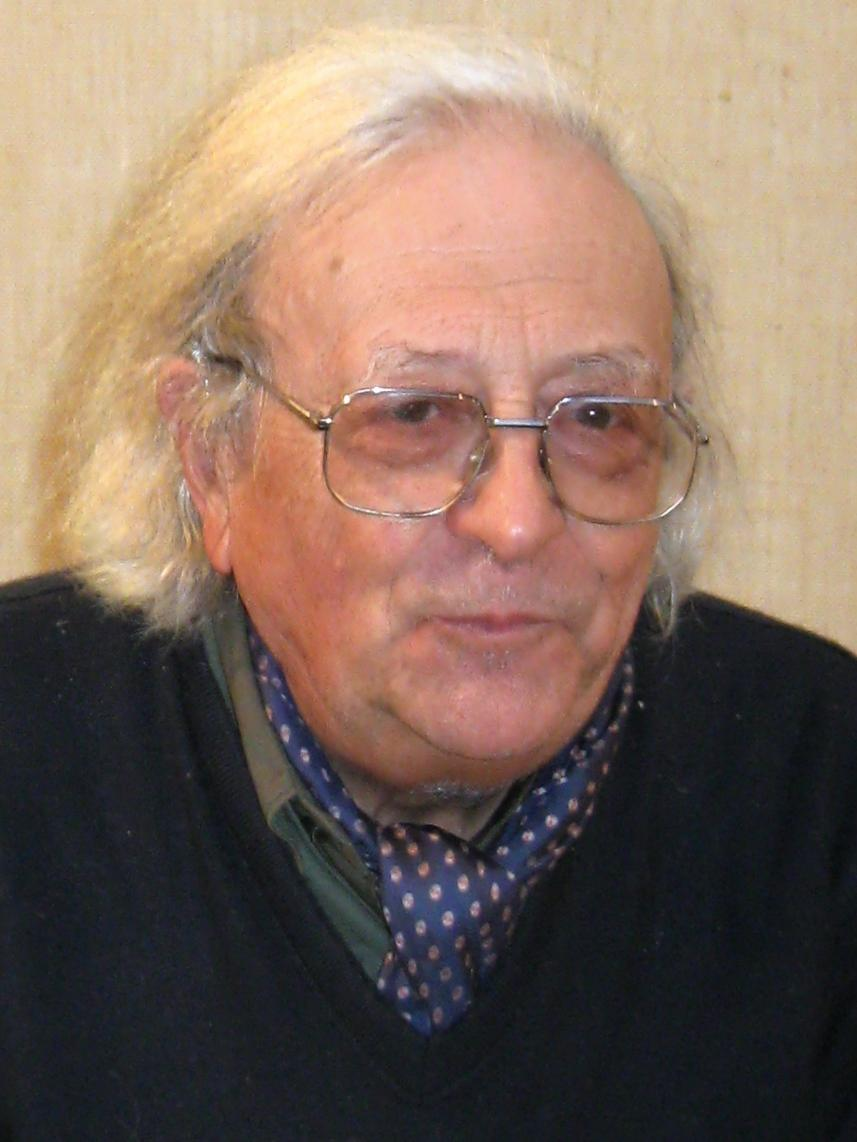
Michel Jeury in 2010

Michel Jeury (23 January 1934 – 9 January 2015) was a French science fiction writer, reputed in the 1970s. He also used the pseudonym of Albert Higon.

== Biography ==
Michel Jeury was born in Razac-d'Eymet.

He began writing science fiction under the pseudonym of Albert Higon and penned two space operas for the Rayon Fantastique imprint of publishers Hachette and Gallimard: Aux Étoiles du Destin [Destiny's Stars] (1960), featuring a cosmic battle between the alien races: the T’Loons and the incomprehensible Glutons, and La Machine du Pouvoir [The Machine Of Power] (1960), which won the 1960 Jules Verne Award.

Jeury returned to the French science fiction scene with the Philip K. Dick-inspired Chronolysis [Le Temps incertain] (1973 - English translation: 1980) and Les Singes du Temps [The Time Monkeys] (1974): both taking place in the same universe, they made him one of the most important writers in the French science fiction scene of the 1970s. Both novels dealt with time travel and its manipulation through the use of “chronolytic” drugs. Their protagonists were “psychronauts”, helpless explorers of a confusing, multidimensional universe, facing threats from alternate universes.

Throughout the 1970s and 1980s, Jeury continued to produce a number of original novels. Le Territoire Humain [The Human Territory] (1979) featured an oasis of humanity existing on the borders of a dehumanized megastate. Les Yeux Géants [The Giant Eyes] (1980) theorized that modern-day UFOs are but projections of mankind's collective unconscious. L'Orbe et la Roue [The Orb And The Wheel] (1982) featured a twenty-thousand-year-old rebel brought back to life in a far future, when the entire solar system had become a giant Dyson sphere, controlled by the rival powers of the Orb (its Lords) and the Wheel (its cosmic engineers).

In 1979, Jeury became a regular contributor to Fleuve Noir's Anticipation imprint, for which he wrote a total of 19 novels between 1980 and 1992. The first, Les Îles de la Lune [The Islands Of The Moon] (1979), started an interconnected book series that developed elements that had already been hinted at in the earlier works, progressively building the notion of a “Jeury Universe” that included "chronolysis", space islands, history being manipulated by the "geoprogrammers", etc. That same universe was further developed in the trilogy of the Colmateurs [The Pluggers], starting in 1981 with Cette Terre [That Earth]. This ambitious series told the story of a pandimensional corps of monitors set up by the mysterious “geoprogrammers” to “plug” holes between alternate Earths. Their enemies are the equally mysterious “Brownians” who attempt to open such holes and facilitate interworld travel. The Colmateurs series was arguably Jeury's masterpiece, combining strong, dramatic characters, tightly-paced narration, cutting-edge science and epic conflicts on a truly mind-boggling scope.

The series was left unfinished when, in the late 1980s, Jeury turned to writing a number of mainstream best-selling novels about life in his native southwestern France at the turn of the century.

== Selected bibliography ==
- Aux Étoiles du Destin [Destiny's Stars] (As Albert Higon) (1960)
- La Machine du Pouvoir [The Machine Of Power] (As Albert Higon) (1960)
- Le Temps Incertain [The Uncertain Time] (1973) - translated (U.S.) as:Chronolysis (1980)
- Les Singes du Temps [The Time Monkeys] (1974)
- Soleil Chaud, Poisson des Profondeurs [Warm Sun, Fish From The Deep] (1976)
- Les Animaux de Justice [The Justice Animals] (As Albert Higon) (1976)
- Le Jour des Voies [The Day Of The Ways] (As Albert Higon) (1977)
- L'Empire du Peuple [The People's Empire] (As Albert Higon, with Pierre Marlson) (1977)
- Le Sablier Vert [The Green Hourglass] (1977)
- Le Monde du Lignus [The World Of The Lignus] (1978)
- Poney-Dragon (1978)
- Les Enfants de Mord [The Children Of Mord] (1979)
- L'Univers-Ombre [The Shadow Universe] (1979)
- Le Territoire Humain [The Human Territory] (1979)
- Les Îles de la Lune [The Islands Of The Moon] (1979)
- Les Écumeurs du Silence [The Reavers Of Silence] (1980)
- Le Sombre Eclat [The Dark Shining] (1980)
- Le Seigneur de l'Histoire [The Lord Of History] (1980)
- Les Yeux Géants [The Giant Eyes] (1980)
- Cette Terre [That Earth] (1981)
- La Sainte Espagne Programmée [The Holy Programmed Spain] (1981)
- Les Hommes-Processeurs [The Processor Men] (1981)
- Le Vol du Serpent [The Flight Of The Serpent] (1982)
- La Planète du Jugement [The Planet Of Judgment] (1982)
- Goer-le-Renard [Goer-The-Fox] (1982)
- L'Orbe et la Roue [The Orb And The Wheel] (1982)
- Les Tours Divines [The Divine Towers] (1983)
- Quand le Temps Soufflera [When Time Blows] (1983)
- Vers l'Âge d'Or [Towards The Golden Age] (1983)
- L'Île Bleue [The Blue Island] (With Jean-Claude Guidicelli) (1983)
- L'Anaphase du Diable [The Devil's Anaphase] (1984)
- Les Louves Debout [The She-Wolves Standing] (1984)
- Les Démons de Jerusalem [The Demons Of Jerusalem] (1985)
- Le Dernier Paradis [The Last Paradise] (1985)
- Les Survivants du Paradis [The Survivors From Paradise] (1985)
- La Marée d'Or [The Golden Tide] (1985)
- Le Jeu du Monde [The World Game] (1985)
- La Croix et la Lionne [The Cross And The She-Lion] (1986)
- Aux Yeux la Lune [The Eyes Of The Moon] (1988)
- Les Mondes Furieux [The Angry Worlds] (1988)
- La Chimère Infernale [The Infernal Chimera] (As Albert Higon) (1992)
- Le Vaisseau-Démon [The Demon-Ship] (As Albert Higon) (1992)
