= Michel Demuth =

French writer, translator, and publisher

Michel Demuth (1939–2006), born in Lyon, was a French writer, translator and publisher.
