= Philippe Curval =

French journalist and writer (1929–2023)

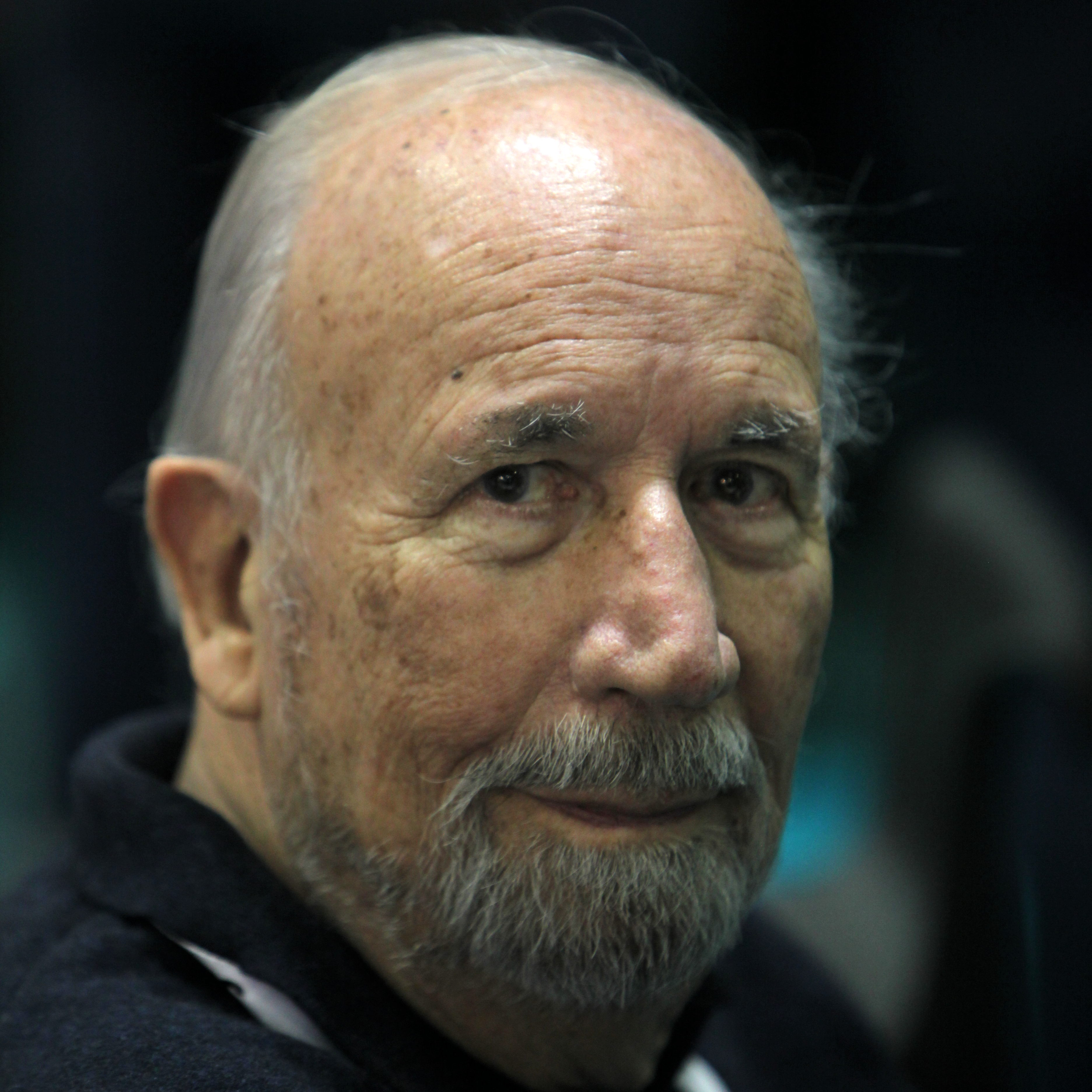
- Curval in 2019
- Born: Philippe Tronche; 27 December 1929; Paris, France
- Died: 5 August 2023 (aged 93)

Philippe Tronche (27 December 1929 – 5 August 2023), better known by the pseudonym of Philippe Curval, was a French journalist and science fiction writer.

Curval first became of interest in 1962 and in 1977 won the Prix Apollo for Cette chère humanité (translated into English by Steve Cox as Brave Old World, Allison & Busby, 1981). He is also known for his works of science fiction criticism and as an editor.

Curval died on 5 August 2023, at the age of 93.
