= Dominique Douay =

French science fiction author (1944–2026)

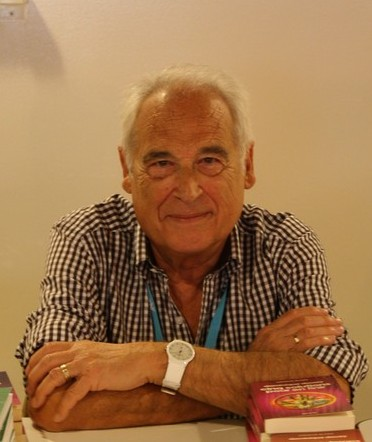
- Douay in 2014
- Born: 16 March 1944; Romans-sur-Isère, German-occupied France
- Died: 19 April 2026 (aged 82)
- Occupation: Author

Dominique Douay (French: [dominˈik dwˈɛ]; 16 March 1944 – 19 April 2026) was a French science fiction author.

Douay studied law in Lyon and Paris and worked with publishing houses such as La Découverte, Éditions Denoël, and Les Moutons électriques.

Douay died on 19 April 2026, at the age of 82.

== Publications ==
- Éclipse ou le Printemps de Terre XII (1975)
- L'Échiquier de la création (1976)
- Cinq solutions pour en finir (1978)
- La Vie comme une course de chars à voile (1978)
- Strates (1978)
- Temps mort - Les Vallées de son corps le gouffre de ses yeux (1979)
- Le Principe de l'œuf (1980)
- L'Impasse-temps (1980)
- Le monde est un théâtre (1982)
- Rhino (1985)
- Les Voyages ordinaires d'un amateur de tableaux (1988)
- Passé recomposé (1988)
- La Fin des temps, et après (1990)
- Car les temps changent (2014)
- La Fenêtre de Diane (2015)
- Brume de cendres (2016)
- Frantz (2019)
- Deux vertiges (et autres malaises) (2022)
