= Philippe Goy =

French science fiction writer (born 1941)

Philippe Goy (born 1941) is a French science fiction writer. He is a photographer under his real name, but he writes under the pseudo-pen name Philip Goy. An alumnus of l'École normale supérieure, he is now a physics researcher at the CNRS.

== Fiction ==
- Le père éternel Paris : Denoël (1974) OCLC 1860252
- Faire le mur, (with Stéphane Dumont) Denoël (1980) ISBN 2-207-30307-1
- Le livre/machine (Special mention at the festival de Metz in 1976)
- Vers la révolution
- Retour à la Terre, définitif (prize for best new writer at the Limoges convention in 1977)
