= Pierre Pelot =

French writer

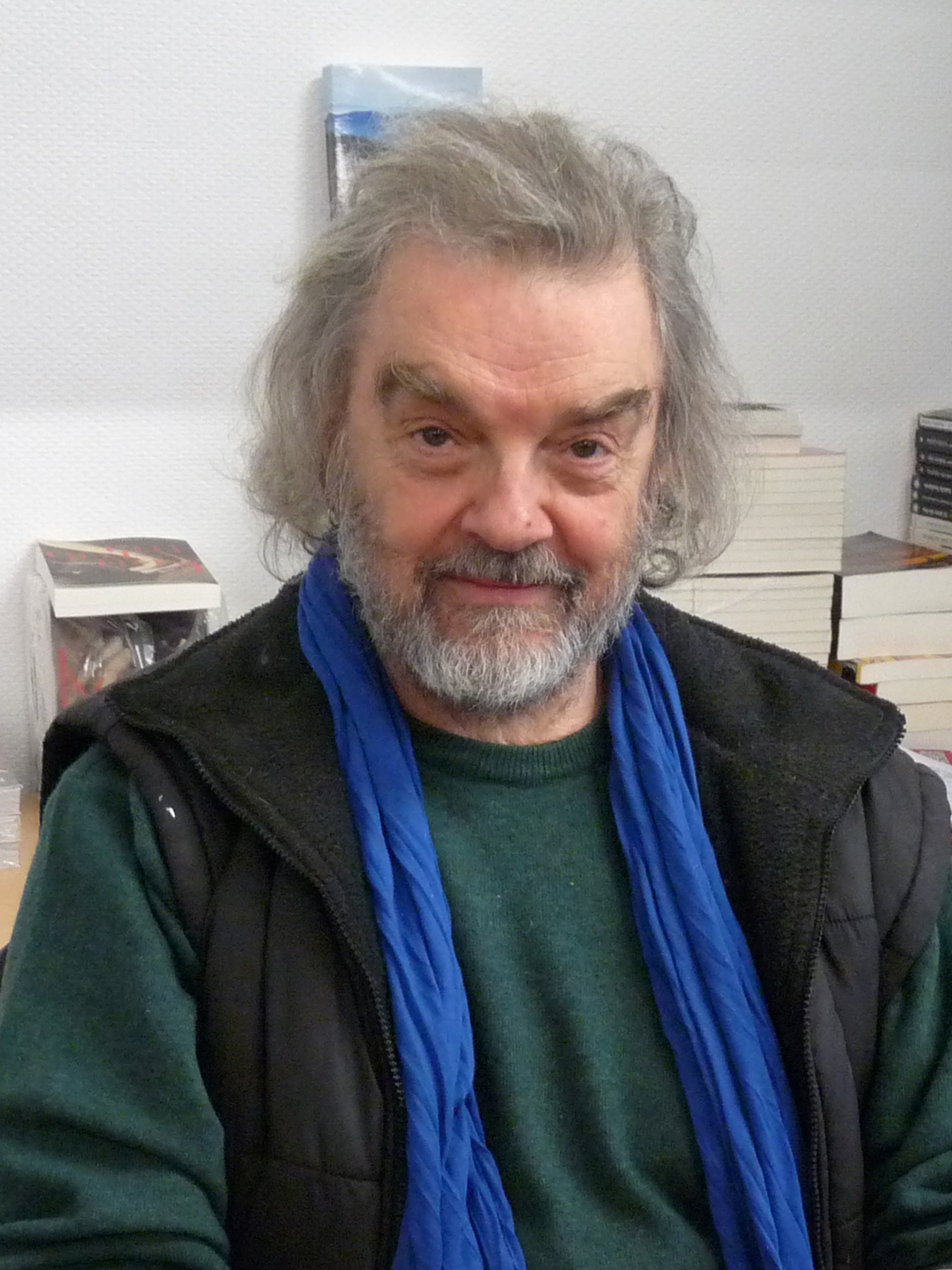
Pierre Pelot (2011)

Pierre Pelot (Pierre Grosdemange, also published as Pierre Suragne or Pierre Carbonari, 1945-), is a French writer of speculative fiction (mostly science fiction).

== Biography ==
Born on 13 November 1945, in Saint-Maurice-sur-Moselle, Vosges, France.

Pelot began his writing career by writing westerns. His first novel, La piste du Dakota [The Dakota Trail], takes place in the United States after the end of the Civil War. It appeared in the imprint Marabout Junior.

In 1967, Pelot created the character of Dylan Stark, who was born in the Confederacy. The first novel in this book series, Quatre Hommes pour l'Enfer ["Four Men to Hell"], also takes place during the Civil War. In this novel Dylan Stark reluctantly fights on the side of the Confederacy. The Dylan Stark series was mostly published by Pocket Marabout starting in 1967.

In the early 1970s, Pelot began to contribute novels to both the Angoisse horror and Anticipation science fiction imprints of publisher Fleuve Noir. For the latter, he penned a series of remarkably mature space operas under the pseudonym of Pierre Suragne. Between 1972 and 1980, Pelot contributed 14 science fiction novels and 7 horror novels to Fleuve Noir. His Anticipation novels were notable for their bleak endings, which was unusual at the time, as well as their new concepts, often incorporating post-1968 political themes such as ecology. They were written in a hard-hitting style borrowed from thrillers rather than space opera, and included the occasional sexual scenes.

Throughout the 1980s, Pelot produced a huge number of novels for virtually every science fiction publisher in France. Most, if not all, carried the same message, vilifying the evils of the military-industrial complex and capitalist economy, protecting the environment and expressing socialist ideas. His works for the most part described police states, utopias and dystopias, and usually featured doomed rebels who tried to see behind the veil of their protected lives. Transit (1977), one of his most accomplished novels, featured an experimental hypnotic journey that leads a researcher to a peaceful utopia.

Pelot's major stream of dystopic novels during the 1980s were produced for Presses-Pocket, for which he wrote twelve novels between 1977 and 1990. Most of these fit in a series entitled Les Hommes sans Futurs ["Men Without A Future"], which portray the desperate and often all too futile wanderings of the last men and women on an Earth now inhabited by unfathomable new mutants.

In the 1990s, Pelot diversified his career further, producing crime thrillers, adventure novels, in addition to his science fiction work.

== Selected bibliography ==
- Les Étoiles Ensevelies [The Buried Stars] (1972)
- Une Autre Terre [Another Earth] (1972)
- La Septième Saison [The Seventh Season] (As Pierre Suragne) (1972)
- Mal Iergo le Dernier [Mal Iergo The Last] (As Pierre Suragne) (1972)
- L'Enfant qui Marchait sur le Ciel [The Child Who Walked on the Sky translated by Michael Shreve, Black Coat Press, 2012, ISBN 978-1-61227-107-1] (As Pierre Suragne) (1972)
- La Nef des Dieux [The Ship of the Gods] (As Pierre Suragne) (1973)
- Les légendes de Terre [The legends of Earth] (1973)
- Mechanic Jungle (As Pierre Suragne) (1973)
- L'Île aux Enragés [The Rabid Island] (1973)
- La Peau de l'Orage [The Skin of the Storm] (As Pierre Suragne) (1973)
- Duz (As Pierre Suragne) (1973)
- Et puis les Loups Viendront [And Then The Wolves Will Come] (As Pierre Suragne) (1973)
- Je suis la Brume [I Am The Mist] (As Pierre Suragne) (1974)
- Mais si les Papillons Trichent? [But What If The Butterflies Cheat? translated by Michael Shreve, Black Coat Press, ISBN 978-1-61227-107-1] (As Pierre Suragne) (1974)
- Le Dieu Truqué [The Phony God] (As Pierre Suragne) (1974)
- Ballade pour Presqu'un Homme [Ballad For Almost A Man] (As Pierre Suragne) (1974)
- Suicide (As Pierre Suragne) (1974)
- Une Si Profonde Nuit [Such A Deep Night] (As Pierre Suragne) (1975)
- Vendredi, Par Exemple [Friday, For Example] (As Pierre Suragne) (1975)
- Brouillards [Fog] (As Pierre Suragne) (1975)
- Elle Était Une Fois [She Was Upon A Time] (As Pierre Suragne) (1976)
- Le Septième Vivant [The Seventh Living] (As Pierre Suragne) (1976)
- Les Barreaux de l'Éden [The Bars of Eden] (1977)
- Foetus-Party (1977)
- Le Sourire des Crabes [The Smile of the Crabs] (1977)
- La Cité au Bout de l'Espace [The City at the End of Space] (As Pierre Suragne) (1977)
- Transit (1977)
- Delirium Circus (1977)
- Canyon Street (1978)
- Le Sommeil du Chien [The Sleep of the Dog] (1978)
- La Rage dans le Troupeau [The Rage in the Flock] (1979)
- Virgules Téléguidées [Remote-Controlled Commas] (As Pierre Suragne) (1980)
- La Guerre Olympique [The Olympic War] (1980)
- Parabellum Tango (1980)
- Le Ciel Bleu d'Irockee [The Blue Sky of Irockee] (1980)
- Dérapages [Out of Control] (As Pierre Suragne) (1980)
- Kid Jesus (1981)
- Les Îles du Vacarme [The Islands of Clamor] (1981)
- Konnar le Barbant [Konnar The Boring] (1981)
- Les Mangeurs d'Argile [The Clay Eaters] (1981)
- Les Pieds dans la Tête [The Feet in the Head] (1982)
- Nos Armes Sont De Miel [Our Weapons Are Made of Honey] (1982)
- Mourir au Hasard [To Die Randomly] (1982)
- Saison de Rouille [Rusty Season] (1982)
- Soleils Hurlants [Screaming Suns] (1983)
- La Foudre au Ralenti [The Slow-Motion Lightning] (1983)
- Le Père de Feu [The Fire-Father] (1984)
- Le Chien Courrait sur l'Autoroute en Criant son Nom [A Dog Was Running on the Highway Shouting Its Name] (1984)
- Paradis Zéro [Paradise Zero] (1985)
- Le Bruit des Autres [The Sound of Others] (1985)
- Ce Chasseur-Là [That Hunter There] (1985)
- Les Passagers du Mirage [The Passengers of the Mirage] (1985)
- Fou dans la Tête de Nazi Jones [Mad in Nazi Jones' Head] (1986)
- Les Conquérants Immobiles [The Motionless Conquerors] (1986)
- Mémoires d'un Épouvantail Blessé au Combat [Memories of a Scarecrow Wounded in Action] (1986)
- Observation du Virus en Temps de Paix [Observation of the Virus During Peace Time] (1986)
- Purgatoire [Purgatory] (1986)
- Alabama Un.Neuf.Six.Six [Alabama 1.9.9.6] (1987)
- Sécession Bis (1987)
- Offensive du Virus sous le Champ de Bataille [Offensive of the Virus on the Battlefield] (1987)
- Aux Chiens Écrasés [The Run-Over Dogs] (1987)
- Le Présent du Fou [The Madman's Gift] (1990)
- Les Forains du Bord du Gouffre [The Carnival on the Edge of the Abyss] (1990)
- Le Ciel sous la Pierre [The Sky Under The Stone] (1990)
- Les Faucheurs de Temps [The Time Reapers] (1990)
- La Nuit du Sagittaire [The Night of Sagittarius] (1990)
- Sur la Piste des Rollmops [On The Trail of the Rollmops] (1990)
- Rollmops Dream (1991)
- Gilbert le Barbant – Le Retour [Gilbert The Boring – The Return] (1991)
- Ultimes Aventures en Territoires Fourbes [Last Adventures in Deceitful Lands] (1991)
- Le Chant de l'Homme Mort [The Song of the Dead Man] (1995)
- Après le Bout du Monde [After The Edge of the World] (1996)
- Messager des Tempêtes Lointaines [Messenger of the Far Storms] (1996)
- C'est ainsi que les hommes vivent, (2003), Prix Erckmann-Chatrian, Feuille d'or de la ville de Nancy
