= Gérard Klein =

French science fiction writer and economist (born 1937)

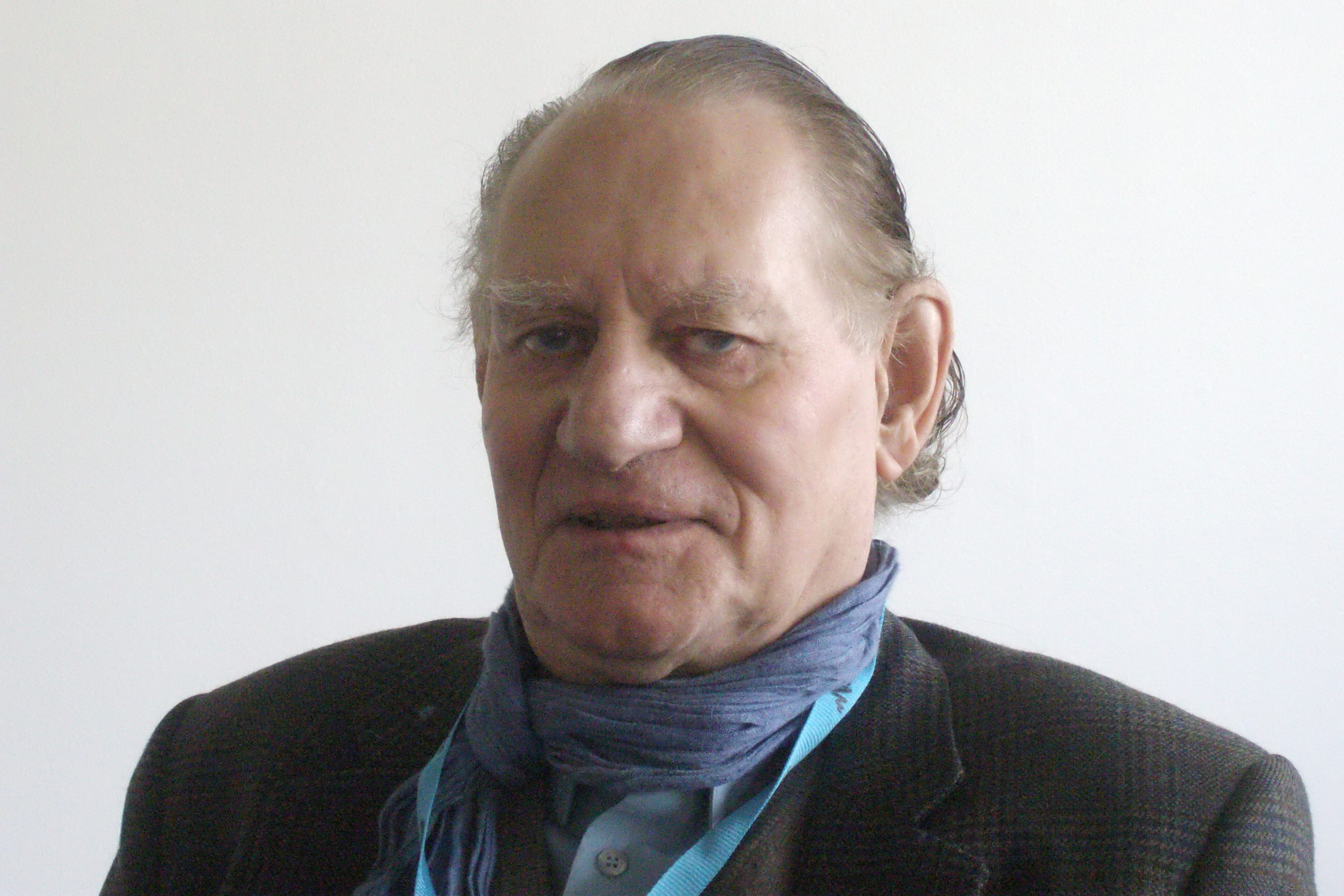
Gérard Klein, Utopiales 2011

Gérard Klein (born 1937) is a French economist and science fiction writer. He has published under pseudonyms, such as Gilles d'Argyre and Mark Starr, as well as under the collective pseudonym François Pagery.

His best known works are Starmaster's Gambit, The Day Before Tomorrow, and The Overlords of War, which was translated into English by the British science fiction author John Brunner.

Since 1969, Klein has been the editor of the influential science fiction series Ailleurs et Demain published by Robert Laffont, in addition to overseeing the Le Livre de Poche science fiction imprint since 1986.

Four of his novels have been published in translation by DAW Books in the United States.

== Selected bibliography ==
=== As Mark Starr ===
- Agent Galactique [Galactic Agent] (1958). Serialized novel in six parts published in Satellite between January and September 1958.

=== As François Pagery (Patrice Rondard, Gérard Klein and Richard Chomet) ===
- Embûches dans l'espace [Ambushes in Space] (1958)

=== As Gérard Klein ===
- Les Perles du temps [The Pearls of Time] (1958)
- Le Gambit des étoiles (1958). Starmasters' Gambit, trans. C. J. Richards (DAW Books, 1973)
- Le temps n'a pas d'odeur [Time Has No Scent] (1963). The Day Before Tomorrow, trans. P. J. Sokolowski (DAW Books, 1972)
- Un chant de pierre [A Song of Stone] (1966)
- Les Seigneurs de la guerre (1970). The Overlords of War, trans. John Brunner (Doubleday, 1973; DAW Books, 1974)
- La Loi du talion [The Law of Retaliation] (1973)
- Histoires comme si... [Stories As If...] (1975)

=== As Gilles d'Argyre ===
- Chirurgiens d'une planète [The Planet Surgeons] (1960); revised as Le Rêve des Forêts [A Dream of Forests] (1987), Argyre's saga volume 1
- Les Voiliers du soleil [The Solar Sailors] (1961), Argyre's saga volume 2
- Le Long voyage [The Long Journey] (1964), Argyre's saga volume 3
- Les Tueurs de temps [The Time Killers] (1965). The Mote in Time's Eye, trans. C. J. Richards (DAW Books, 1975)
- Le Sceptre du hasard [The Scepter of Chance] (1968)
