= André Ruellan =

- Born: August 7, 1922; Courbevoie, France
- Died: November 10, 2016 (aged 94)
- Writing career
- Language: French
- Genres: Science fiction, horror

André Ruellan (7 August 1922 – 10 November 2016) was a French science fiction and horror writer who has also used the pseudonym of Kurt Steiner, Kurt Wargar and André Louvigny.

== Overview ==
Among the best authors published by the Angoisse horror imprint of Editions Fleuve Noir in the 1950s was André Ruellan, a physician who used the pseudonym of Kurt Steiner to pen 22 novels, mastering all the classic themes and creating some new ones as well. Perhaps because of Ruellan's medical background, the strength of his novels lay in their detailed, almost clinical, atmosphere of heavy, oppressive, bludgeoning horror, which anticipated the stronger, gorier, books of the next decades.

For the Anticipation science fiction imprint of Fleuve Noir, Ruellan also penned two heroic fantasy novels starring the futuristic knight, Dal Ortog Dal of Galankar. The world of Ortog is a futuristic Earth where sophisticated science cohabits with a pseudo-medieval society. In the first novel, Ortog is sent by its ruler, Karella, to find a cure for the slow death that is killing Earth and its inhabitants after a devastating interplanetary war. Ortog eventually returns with such a cure, but too late to save his love, Karella’s daughter, Kalla. In the sequel, Ortog, and his friend Zoltan, embark on an Orpheus-like quest through the dimensions of Death to find Kalla’s soul and bring her back to Earth. He eventually finds her, loses her again and returns to Earth, cursed with immortality.

Ruellan's science fiction novels are equally remarkable. Le 32 Juillet [32 July] (1959) describes how a man finds himself in another dimension and explores the vast insides of a giant organism. Les Enfants de l'Histoire [The Children Of History] (1969) is a thinly-disguised allegory of the political events of May 1968 recast in future guise. Le Disque Rayé [The Scratched Record] (1970) involves a complex time loop. Brebis Galeuses [Black Sheep] (1974) is a clever medical dystopia.

André Ruellan has written a number of screenplays for film director Alain Jessua. His novel Le Seuil du Vide was adapted into an eponymous 1971 film.

== Selected bibliography ==
(as Kurt Steiner except where otherwise mentioned.)

- Alerte aux Monstres [Alert, Monsters] (As Kurt Wargar) (1953)
- Le Bruit du Silence [The Sound Of Silence] (1955)
- Pour Que Vive Le Diable [For The Devil To Live] (1956)
- Fenêtres sur l'Obscur [Windows Into Darkness] (1956)
- De Flamme et d'Ombre [Of Flame And Shadow] (1956)
- Le Seuil du Vide [The Threshold Of The Void] (1956)
- Les Rivages de la Nuit [The Shores Of Night] (1957)
- Je Suis Un Autre [I Am Other] (1957)
- Les Dents Froides [The Cold Teeth] (1957)
- L'Envers du Masque [The Other Side Of The Mask] (1957)
- Les Pourvoyeurs [The Purveyors] (1957)
- Sueurs [Sweat] (1957)
- L'Herbe aux Pendus [The Herb Of The Hanged Men] (1958)
- La Marque du Démon [The Mark Of The Demon] (1958)
- Lumière de Sang [Blood Light] (1958)
- Syncope Blanche [White Faint] (1958)
- La Village de la Foudre [The Village Of Lightning] (1958)
- Le Prix du Suicide [The Price Of Suicide] (1958)
- Menace d'Outre-Terre [Menace From Beyond] (1958)
- La Chaîne de Feu [The Chain Of Fire] (1959)
- Dans un Manteau de Brume [In A Cloak Of Mist] (1959)
- Mortefontaine [Deadfountain] (1959)
- Salamandra (1959)
- Le 32 Juillet [July 32] (1959)
- Glace Sanglante [Bloody Ice] (1960)
- Le Masque des Regrets [The Mask Of Regrets] (1960)
- Aux Armes d'Ortog [Under Ortog's Arms] (1960) (translated by Brian Stableford in Ortog (2009) ISBN 978-1-935558-28-6)
- S.O.S. Passé [SOS Past] (As André Louvigny) (1960)
- Manuel du Savoir-Mourir [Manual Of How-To-Die] (As André Ruellan) (1963)
- Les Improbables (1965)
- Les Océans du Ciel [The Oceans Of The Sky] (1967)
- Ortog et les Ténèbres [Ortog And The Darkness] (1969) (translated by Brian Stableford in Ortog (2009) ISBN 978-1-935558-28-6)
- Les Enfants de l'Histoire [The Children Of History] (1969)
- Le Disque Rayé [The Scratched Record] (1970)
- Tunnel (As André Ruellan) (1973)
- Brebis Galeuses [Black Sheep] (1974)
- Un Passe Temps [A Pastime] (1979)
- Les Chiens [The Dogs] (As André Ruellan) (1979)
- Mémo (As André Ruellan) (1984)
- Grand Guignol 36-88 (1988)
- Le Terme (As André Ruellan) (1995)
- Albert et Georgette (As André Ruellan) (1995)
- On a Tiré sur le Cercueil [They Shot At The Coffin] (As André Ruellan) (1997)
