= Laurent Genefort =

French writer

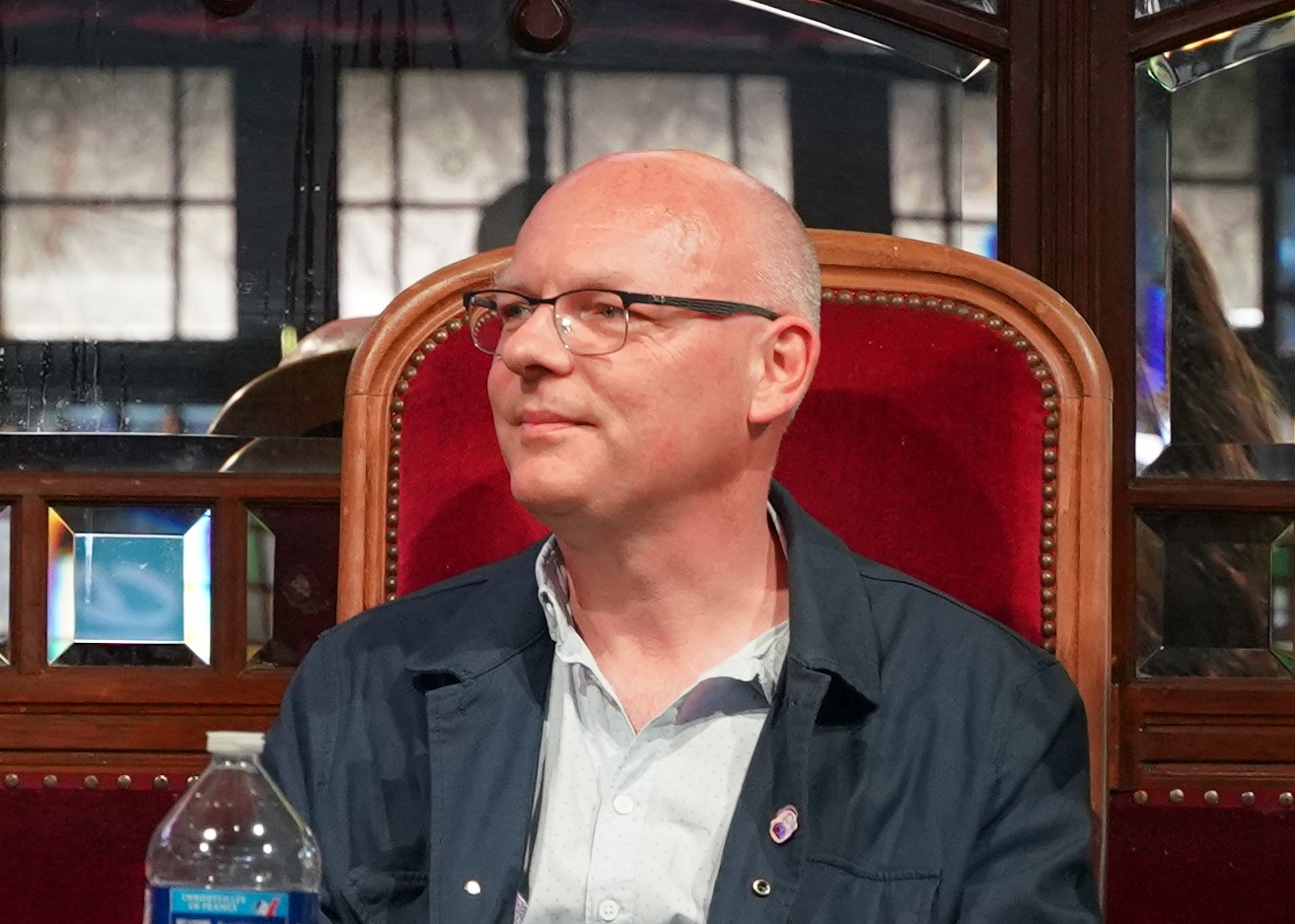
Laurent Genefort 2023 in Épinal (France)

Laurent Genefort (born 1968) is a French science fiction writer. He studied literature at the Sorbonne (Paris IV). He has been writing SF since 1988, with around 50 novels and 40 short stories to his credit, including the "Omale" cycle, his most famous work. He also has written fantasy cycles : "Alaet" and "Hordes". He won his first Grand Prix de l'Imaginaire in 1995 for Arago.

== Fiction ==
- Le Bagne des ténèbres (1988)
- Les Peaux-épaisses (1992)
- REZO (1993)
- Arago (1993)
- Les chasseurs de sève (1994) ISBN 978-2-207-24771-6
- La Troisième lune (1994)
- Le Labyrinthe de chair (1995)
- De chair et de fer (1995)
- L'Homme qui n'existait plus (1996) - Jean-Michel Ponzio made this story into a graphic novel under the title Kybrilon in March 2005
- Les Voies du ciel (1996)
- La Compagnie des fous (1996)
- Lyane (1996)
- Le Sang des immortels (1997)
- Le Continent déchiqueté (1997)
- Typhon (1997)
- Dans la gueule du Dragon (1998)
- Les Croisés du vide (1998)
- Le Château cannibale (1998)
- Les Engloutis (1999)
- Le Sablier de Sang (1999)
- Une porte sur l'éther (2000) ISBN 978-2-265-07014-1
- La Citadelle des dragons (2000)
- Le Démon-miroir (2001)
- Omale (2001) ISBN 978-2-290-30488-4
- Le Labyrinthe sans retour (2001)
- La Frontière magique (2001)
- Les conquérants dOmale (2002)
- Le Piège aux sorciers (2002)
- La mécanique du talion (2003) ISBN 978-2-84172-257-0
- Le Sablier maléfique (2003)
- La Caravane des ombres (2003)
- La muraille sainte d'Omale (2004)
- L'Odyssée des sirènes (2004)
- Le Nom maudit (2005)
- La Guerre de l'aube (2006)
- L'Ascension du Serpent (2007)
- Le Vol de l'Aigle (2008)
- Mémoria (2008)
- Les Crocs du Tigre (2010)
- Points chauds (2012)
- Les Vaisseaux d’Omale (2014)
- Lum'en (2015)
- Etoiles sans issue (2017)
- Ce qui relie (2017)
- Ce qui divise (2017)
- Ce qui révèle (2018)
- Colonies (2019)
- L'Espace entre les guerres (2020)
- Les Temps ultramodernes (2022)
- Opexx (novella, 2022)
- La Croisière bleue (2024)

== Non-Fiction ==
- Architecture du livre-univers dans la science-fiction, à travers cinq œuvres : Noô de S. Wul, Dune de F. Herbert, La Compagnie des glaces de G.-J. Arnaud, Helliconia de B. Aldiss, Hypérion de D. Simmons (1997) - Thesis. Université de Nice Sophia-Antipolis.

Plus more than 30 articles and prefaces about science fiction.
