= The Chimera Brigade – Ultimate Renaissance =

French comic

- Author: Serge Lehman
- Illustrator: Stéphane de Caneva
- Publisher: Delcourt
- Genre(s): Steampunk, Fantastique
- Original language: French
- Preceded by: The Chimera Brigade

The Chimera Brigade – Ultimate Renaissance is a comic book written by Serge Lehman and drawn by Stéphane de Caneva. Published by Éditions Delcourt in 2022, it depicts the return of the superheroes to Paris, after their disappearance following the events recounted in the series The Chimera Brigade.

== Plot ==
Hyperworld specialist Charles Dex heads a cultural archaeology laboratory that investigates scientific aberrations. Following an attack by a giant rat in the Paris metro, he is tasked with finding the European supermen who disappeared on the eve of the Second World War.

== Development ==
Although the idea of a sequel to The Chimera Brigade was first mooted when the original series was written – the last panel shows Jean Séverac's lost ring, with the comment "Et c'est quand vous m'aurez tous renié que je reviendrais parmi vous" – the project didn't really take shape until 2016. First of all, the wave of Islamist attacks in France in 2015 prompted Serge Lehman to reinvest the superheroic imagination of 21st-century France. In addition, the editorial setbacks encountered on the series L'Œil de la Nuit, when Jean de La Hire's heirs objected to his reuse of the Nyctalope character, provoked strong frustration in Serge Lehman, leading him to return to his own creation: The Chimera Brigade.

== Analysis ==
The Chimera Brigade – Ultimate Renaissance is divided into eight chapters to maintain the soap opera style of the original series.

Ultimate Renaissance seeks to be part of a global history of superheroes, not only by multiplying nods to American superheroes, but also by referring to their alter-egos: Mikros, L'Archer blanc, Fox-Boy, Le Garde Républicain, in order to highlight the richness of French superheroes.

== Related works ==
Ultimate Renaissance takes place in the universe created by Serge Lehman, Fabrice Colin and Gess from the series The Chimera Brigade, published between 2009 and 2010. The plot of Ultimate Renaissance, set five years after the events of Masqué, also makes reference to the series L'Homme truqué and Metropolis.

Script by Serge Lehman.

- The Chimera Brigade, drawing by Gess (L'Atalante, 2009–2010)
- Masqué, drawing by Stéphane Crépy (Delcourt, 2012–2013)
- L'Homme truqué, drawing by Gess (L'Atalante, 2013)
- Metropolis, drawing by De Caneva (Delcourt, 2014–2017)
- L'Œil de la Nuit, drawing by Gess (Delcourt, 2015–2016)

== See also ==
- Serge Lehman
- The Chimera Brigade
