= Nyctalope =

First cyborg depicted in fiction

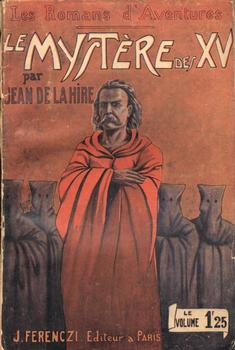
The Nyctalope on the cover of Le Mystère des XV

The Nyctalope, also known as Léon "Leo" Saint-Clair, is a pulp fiction hero and explorer created in 1911 by French writer Jean de La Hire. Along with being an athletic man with great wealth and strong scientific knowledge, the Saint-Clair has perfect night vision and enhanced eyesight due to a gunshot wound affecting his optic nerves in a unique way. This, and the side-effect that his eyes now sometimes have a yellow, reflective coloring, inspires his nickname "Nyctalope" (which, in French, refers to an animal with excellent night vision, although in English the same word refers to night-blindness). Due to an experimental surgery, the Nyctalope also possesses a mechanical, electrical heart that increases his vitality and stamina. Because he has an artificial organ that grants enhanced abilities, some consider the Nyctalope to be the first adventurer in literature who is also a cyborg.

Largely unknown outside of France during the 20th century, the character is now considered by some to be an obscure precursor to the superhero genre. Most Nyctalope storylines were presented in serialized form in French publications, then quickly collected and republished as novels. In 1908, author La Hire wrote the story L'Homme Qui Peut Vivre dans l'Eau (in English, "The Man Who Could Live Underwater"). In it, a support character named Jean Sainte-Claire aids the protagonist. In 1911, La Hire presented a sequel to this story in Le Mystère des XV ("The Mystery of the Fifteen," later re-published in English as The Nyctalope on Mars). This story introduced the character as Leo Saint-Clair, a famous hero with enhanced abilities called the "Nyctalope" who investigates and fights large-scale threats such as dictators, mad scientists, terrorist organizations, and aliens (multiple books of the series directly reference or use characters from the works of H.G. Wells). Like many American pulp heroes, the Nyctalope often is assisted by friends and allies, including a group he forms called the Committee of Information and Defense Against Evil.

In his early stories, it is said that the Nyctalope's father is Jean (the character seen in the first story from 1908), who was a member of the French Navy. Dismissing his own canon later, author La Hire used the Nyctalope's origin story (published in 1933) to establish that his father is an engineer and chemist named Pierre Saint-Clair. The Nyctalope stories contain other contradictions and gaps regarding the character's past, physical traits, and personal life.

Starting in the 2006, publisher Black Coat Press began releasing new stories featuring the Nyctalope. The same publisher has also released new English language editions of La Hire's original Nyctalope stories.

== Publishing history ==
Jean de La Hire (the pen name of Adolphe d'Espi) began his science fiction adventure series in 1908 with the novel L'Homme Qui Peut Vivre dans l'Eau (in English, "The Man Who Could Live Underwater"). In this story, there is a supporting character named Jean de Sainte Clair who is the assistant to Charles Severac, the inventor and captain of a great submarine known as the Torpedo. The story features Severac and Jean de Sainte Clair encountering the mad scientist Oxus. With help from his associates (a monk named Fulbert and surgeon named Balsan), Oxus has created a hybrid shark-man called the Ichtaner, meant to be the first of an army of aquatic super-soldiers who will be unleashed on humanity. Severac is able to defeat Oxus and undo his plans thanks to help from Sainte Clair.

In 1911, La Hire published a sequel to L'Homme Qui Peut Vivre dans l'Eau by featuring the same villain, now years older, in the story Le Mystère des XV (in English, "The Mystery Of The XV"). In this book, La Hire introduces Leo Saint-Clair, a wealthy adventurer with enhanced vitality and night-vision known to colleagues by the nickname of the "Nyctalope." Leo becomes the star of subsequent stories, some of which refer to his father as a naval officer named Jean (implying he is the same character Jean featured in L'Homme Qui Peut Vivre dans l'Eau despite the surname being spelled slightly differently). In 1933 however, the origin story L'Assassinat du Nyctalope ("The Assassination of the Nyctalope") establishes that the Nyctalope's father is named Pierre and that he is a research scientist specializing in electrical engineering and chemistry. The Nyctalope stories contain other contradictions and gaps regarding the character's past, physical traits, and personal life.

In Le Mystère des XV, the villain Oxus from the first book is now the leader of a secret group called the "Society of the XV" who use "radioplanes" (aircraft able to travel on radio waves) to travel to the planet Mars and set up a secret base there. The XV then kidnap 15 women from Earth to take back to Mars as their wives. Koynos, a rival of the Nyctalope, kidnaps Léo Saint-Clair's fiancée Xaviere de Ciserat. The Nyctalope then journeys to Mars to free the kidnapped women. During the adventure, the Nyctalope and the XV encounter native Martians. The book also clearly references the events of the 1898 novel The War of the Worlds as having actually occurred in the world of the Nyctalope, making Le Mystère des XV a fan-fiction sequel of sorts to the famous work by H.G. Wells.

In Le Roi de la Nuit ("The King Of The Night") (1923), La Hire once again borrowed characters from H.G. Wells. The story features Nyctalope using technology developed by Professor Cavor, a fictional scientist who first appears in the 1870 Wells novel From the Earth to the Moon. The same book introduces a new love interest for Saint-Clair, Veronique d'Olbans who is then said to become his wife. No full explanation is offered as to what happened to previous love interest Xaviere. Similarly, Veronique is not seen again after this story.

In La Captive du Démon ("The Demon's Captive") (1927), a religious character named Mathias Lumen states his belief that Saint-Clair is an actual agent of God. He states: "God sometimes allows His infallible justice and rightful wrath to manifest themselves upon the face of this Earth … And YOU are that manifestation! … You, the Nyctalope!" The same story introduces new love interest Sylvie MacDhul, whom the Nyctalope is said to marry. Unlike previous love interests, Sylvie makes more appearances in the subsequent novels. The book Titania (1929) introduces Pierre, the son of Sylvie and the Nyctalope. Sylvie and young Pierre appear again in the 1933 story Les Mystères de Lyon ("The Mysteries of Lyon"). In the 1934 story Le Sphinx du Maroc ("The Moroccan Sphinx"), it is stated that Sylvie died "three years ago" and the Nyctalope is now a widower. His son Pierre is not seen again in later stories.

In 1933, twenty-two years after reintroducing his character as the Nyctalope, La Hire reveals the origin for his character's enhanced abilities in the story L'Assassinat du Nyctalope ("The Assassination of the Nyctalope", later published in English as Enter the Nyctalope). The story reveals that at the age of 20, Léo Saint-Clar encounters villainous nihilists who belong to a group called the Red Circle. During this initial adventure, a gunshot wound miraculously causes Leo to gain perfect night-vision (the side effect being that his eyes sometimes shine with a yellow tint). Later in the story, he is stabbed in the chest but then aided by renowned surgeon and scientist Dr. de Villiers-Pagan who replaces his heart with a mechanical prototype.

In 1940, La Hire also published an anti-French and pro-Nazi volume, Le Crime des évacuations; Les Horreurs que nous avons vues, in which he praised the Nazis for their helpfulness to the French war refugees. During the German occupation of France, he joined the National Popular Rally (RNP) and the Groupe Collaboration. After World War II ended, La Hire was convicted in 1948 of indignité nationale as a collaborator with the Vichy government and Nazi Germany. His books lost popularity, although two more volumes he had partially written were then completed and published by his son-in-law. These two final books were La Sorcière Nue ("The Nude Sorceress") in 1954 and L'Énigme du Squelette ("The Enigma of the Skeleton") in 1955.

La Hire died in 1956 and his books fell into obscurity. During the 20th century, they were not republished and were never translated into other languages. In the 21st century, some volumes of the Nyctalope series were published in English by Black Coat Press, translated either by Brian Stableford or by Black Coat Press editors/publishers Jean-Marc and Randy Lofficier.

Only some the books in the Nyctalope series have been published in English by Black Coat Press. Some of these stories were translated by Brian Stableford while others were translated by Jean-Marc Lofficier and Randy Lofficier.

Following L'Homme Qui Peut Vivre dans l'Eau ("The Man Who Could Live Underwater") in 1909, La Hire's official Nyctalope stories include:

1. Le Mystère des XV ("The Mystery Of The XV") (1911) - The Nyctalope on Mars, as translated by Brian Stableford and published by Black Coat Press (ISBN 978-1-934543-46-7)
2. Lucifer (1921) - Nyctalope vs Lucifer, as translated by Brian Stableford and published by Black Coat Press (ISBN 978-1-932983-98-2)
3. L'Amazone du Mont Everest ("The Amazon Of Mount Everest") (1925)
4. La Captive du Démon ("The Demon's Captive") (1927) - translated into English by Michael Shreve and included in The Nyctalope vs. the Antichrist, published by Black Coat Press (ISBN 978-1-64932-266-1)
5. Titania (1929) - translated into English by Michael Shreve as The Nyctalope vs. Titania, published by Black Coat Press (ISBN 978-1-64932-395-8)
6. Belzébuth (1930)
7. Gorillard (1932)
8. Les Mystères de Lyon ("The Mysteries of Lyon") (1933) - translated into English by Michael Shreve as The Nyctalope - The Witch-Queen of Lyon, published by Black Coat Press (ISBN 978-1-64932-458-0)
9. L'Assassinat du Nyctalope ("The Assassination of the Nyctalope") (1933) - Enter the Nyctalope, as translated by Brian Stableford and published by Black Coat Press (ISBN 1-934543-99-3)
10. Le Sphinx du Maroc ("The Moroccan Sphinx") (1934)
11. La Croisière du Nyctalope ("The Nyctalope's Cruise") (1936)
12. Le Maître de la Vie ("The Master of Life") (1938) - translated into English by Michael Shreve as The Nyctalope and the Master of Life, published by Black Coat Press (ISBN 978-1-64932-116-9)
13. Le Mystère de la Croix du Sang ("The Mystery of the Cross Of Blood") (1941) - (adapted into English by Jessica Sequeira as The Cross of Blood and included in The Nyctalope and The Tower of Babel, published by Black Coat Press (ISBN 978-1-61227-701-1)
14. Les Drames de Paris ("The Dramas of Paris") (1941)
15. Rien qu'une Nuit ("Only One Night") (1941) - Night of the Nyctalope, as translated by Jean-Marc Lofficier and Randy Lofficier and published by Black Coat Press (ISBN 978-1-61227-211-5)
16. L'Enfant Perdu ("The Lost Child") (1942) - The Nyctalope Steps In, as translated by Jean-Marc Lofficier and Randy Lofficier and published by Black Coat Press (ISBN 978-1-61227-102-6)
17. Le Roi de la Nuit ("The King Of The Night") (1943) - The Return of the Nyctalope, as translated by Brian Stableford and published by Black Coat Press (ISBN 978-1-61227-028-9)
18. La Sorcière Nue ("The Nude Sorceress") (written c. 1940; published 1954)
19. L'Énigme du Squelette ("The Enigma of the Skeleton") (written c. 1940; published 1955)

== Fictional biography ==
Léon "Leo" Saint-Clair is presented with some contradictions regarding his past. He is first said to be the son of Jean Saint-Clair (or "Jean Sainte-Claire"), an office in the French Navy. Later, it is established that Leo is born in 1891 or 1892 and grows up in France, the son of renowned wealthy research scientist Pierre Saint-Clair and his wife Madam Saint-Clair. The family property is located between Paris and Bourg-la-Reine and is described as "comprising a comfortable house, grounds enclosed by high walls, and vast commons." Growing up, Leo becomes a notable competitive athlete. He also has an interest in science and during his life often acts as a lab assistant to his father, learning many things about electrical engineering and chemistry.

On March 3, 1912, when Léo is twenty-years-old, a mercenary called Sadi Khan collaborates with Russian terrorist Grigoryi Alexandrovich to steal Pierre's experimental Radiant Z technology which is capable of overriding and manipulating all wireless telegraphy communication. Sadi Khan invades the Saint-Clair home and takes the technology and schematics, while Pierre is shot and left for dead. Madam Saint-Clair and Leo return home in time to help Pierre, although they are unable to prevent several leftover time bombs from destroying the lab.

Determined to reacquire the Radiant Z schematics and technology, and wanting to avenge the attack on his father and home, young Léo recruits a group of friends to aid him. He also convinces his father to give him power over the family wealth and resources to ensure he can acquire what he needs to hunt down Sadi Khan and his collaborators. After arriving in Switzerland, Saint-Clair and his allies are attacked. As their enemies escape, Saint-Clair is shot across the forehead and falls unconscious, bleeding from the head. By sheer chance, retired French military General Le Breuil comes upon the scene, accompanied by nurse Aurora Malianova. Le Breuil offers to help, explaining that Aurora works at a nearby clinic headed by the general's brother-in-law, a surgeon and scientist named Dr. de Villiers-Pagan. The doctor and Nurse Malianova see Leo's bullet wound is superficial and are able to tend to the wound.

On waking, Saint-Clair is shocked to find himself blind. de Villiers-Pagan initially believes this is temporary, but then notes that Saint-Clair's eyes now have a yellow internal coloration similar to "a lynx at dusk" or "certain nocturnal birds." A test proves that although Saint-Clair is temporarily blinded by any source of light, he can see perfectly in darkness, able to perceive detailed features and color without difficulty. Dr. de Villiers-Pagan hypothesizes that Saint-Clair's night vision is the result of the bullet impact producing a unique shock that transformed his optic nerves. Saint-Clair remarks "Ah, I'm a nyctalope, a nyctalope!" Although the term nyctalope in English refers to people who have a form of night-blindness, the word in French refers to animals who have poor vision in daylight but excellent night-vision.

After five days of being blind when exposed to light, Leo's eyes adjust and he is able to once again see in daylight. With his eyesight restored, he quickly falls in love with Aurora Malianova, who has been helping to look after him. After confirming he still has perfect night vision as well, Leo is satisfied he lives up to his self-appointed nickname of "Nyctalope" and declares his hunt for his enemies will now continue. Saint-Clair's friend Robert Champeau announces, "Long live the Nyctalope!"

The Nyctalope and his allies track down the enemies, but in the process it is revealed that Aurora is actually Katyushka "Katia" Garcheva, a Russian agent working under the direction of her lover and mentor Grigoryi Alexandrovich. Although Leo insists he can forgive Aurora/Katia of any previous actions and that they can have a life together, she lures him into being Grigoryi's captive. Later on, Leo and Grigoryi are locked in battle, with Grigoryi shot dead and the Nyctalope stabbed in the chest just as his allies arrive to rescue him.

Leo is once again brought to the care of Dr. de Villiers-Pagan who employs experimental surgery to save the hero's life. The surgeon replaces Leo's damaged heart with an artificial, mechanical heart electrically charged by a magnet, a prototype that previously had only been used on test animals. A week after the surgery, the Nyctalope revives and quickly recovers afterward. He now has increased vitality and stamina because his artificial heart slows down the buildup of fatigue toxins in his system.

Although Sadi Khan disappears, Leo is satisfied that his employer Grigoryi is dead. Aurora, after discovering the Nyctalope is rescued, fatally poisons herself rather than face imprisonment. Leo does not reveal the nurse's true name and nature to the authorities, who assume her overdose is accidental. Following these events, Leo finds himself motivated to hunt down other spies, terrorists, and villains who escape conventional authorities.

Eventually, Leo Saint-Clair is engaged to Xaviere de Ciserat. By this time, Earth humans have had contact with Martian inhabitants. A group known as the XV ("the Fifteen") sets up a base on Mars and kidnaps Xaviere. The Nyctalope journeys there to rescue her and others from the villain Orxus, leader of the XV. Later on, Xavier disappears from the Nyctalope's life and there is some implication she dies. Leo later falls in love with and marries Veronique d'Olbans. She is later gone from his life for unclear reasons.

At one point in his career, the Nyctalope faces Baron Von Wartek, an international criminal so evil that enemies simply call him Lucifer. Unsure he can attain victory alone, the Nyctalope assembles a group of allies and agents to help against Lucifer, calling it the Committee of Information and Defense Against Evil. This group, sometimes simply called the Committee of Information and Defence (CID), includes the Nyctalope's Corsican bodyguards Vitto and Soca.

The Nyctalope later meets and marries Sylvie MacDhul. The two share more adventures together and have a son named Pierre. While Pierre is still very young, Syvlie dies. What becomes of their son is not clear.

== Legacy ==
Léo Saint-Claire AKA the Nyctalope receives mentions in volumes 2 and 3 of the graphic novel seriesThe League of Extraordinary Gentlemen written by Alan Moore and drawn by Kevin O'Neill.

A version of the Nyctalope appears in the French comic book series Le Brigade Chimerique (first published in Europe from 2009–2010), created by writer Serge Lehman with Fabrice Colin, and with artwork by Gess. The series was later published in English as The Chimera Brigade by Titan Comics in 2014. Set just before World War II, the series features several characters meant to be analogues and homages to heroes of early comic books, pulp fiction magazines, and adventure stories (for example, a man who looks like Superman is referred as "Steele" and a man drawn to resemble the Shadow is referred to as "the Hidden"). One of the main characters is Marc Saint-Clair, a French adventurer with perfect night-vision who has access to advanced technology. Rather than being called Nyctalope, he is instead commonly referred to as "the Eye." He is assigned by Marie Curie to be the "protector of Paris."

The original Nyctalope has appeared directly in new stories featured in several volumes of the Tales of the Shadowmen anthology series published by Black Coat Press, including:

- "Marguerite" by Jean-Marc Lofficier, published in volume 2, Gentleman of the Night (2006).
- "The Heart of a Man" by Roman Leary, published in volume 5, The Vampires of Paris (2009).
- "Out of Time" by Emmanuel Gorlier, published in volume 6, Grand Guignol (2010).
- "The Children of Heracles" by Roman Leary, published in volume 6, Grand Guignol (2010).
- "Fiat Lux!" by Emmanuel Gorlier, published in volume 7, Femmes Fatales (2010).
- "Death to the Heretic!" by Paul Hugli, published in volume 7, Femmes Fatales (2010).
- "The Mysterious Island of Dr. Antekirtt" by David Vineyard, published in volume 7, Femmes Fatales (2010)

Léo Saint-Clair also appears in the novel The Return of the Nyctalope by Jean-Marc Lofficier & Randy Lofficier (2013, Black Coat Press)(ISBN 978-1-61227-211-5).

== Documentation ==
Shadowmen: Heroes and Villains of French Pulp Fiction: Published in 2003, by Jean-Marc Lofficier and Randy Lofficier and published by Black Coat Press, is an encyclopedic guide to some of the most important characters from French fiction, including Nyctalope.
