= Serge Lehman =

French writer

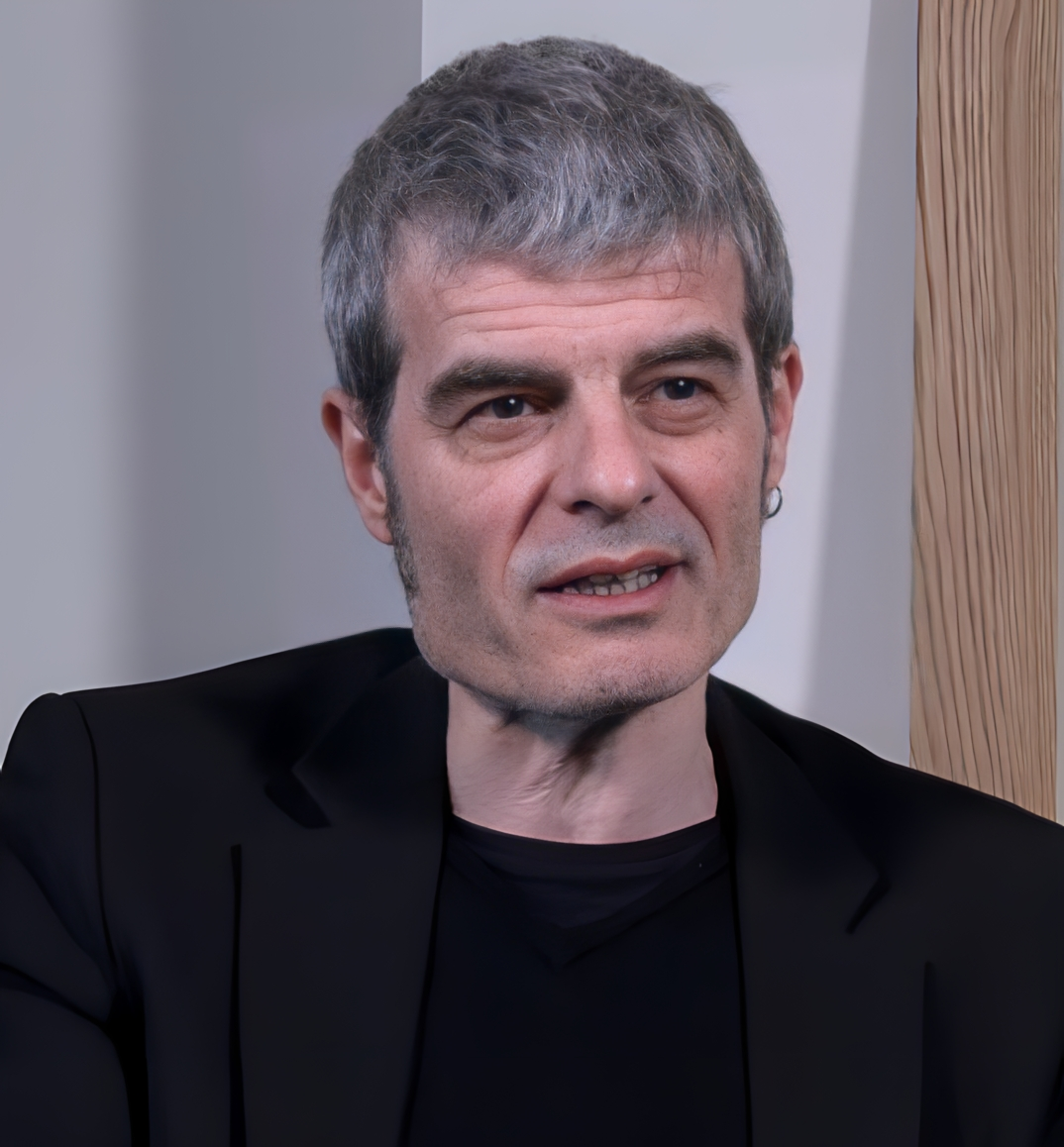
- Serge Lehman in 2019
- Born: Pascal Fréjean; July 12, 1964 (age 62)
- Writing career
- Language: French
- Genre: Science fiction

Serge Lehman (born July 12, 1964) is the primary pseudonym of French science fiction writer Pascal Fréjean.

== Profile ==
Fréjean has also written under the names Corteval, Don Hérial, and Karel Dekk. He won the Prix Rosny-Aîné with the novel trilogy F.A.U.S.T. and short fiction work such as "Dans l'abîme" and "Origami". F.A.U.S.T also won the Grand Prix de l'Imaginaire 1998. His stories have also appeared in Tales of the Shadowmen and he worked on the script of the film Immortel (Ad Vitam) by Enki Bilal.

He gained critical attention outside the science fiction field in France with The Chimera Brigade in 2009–2010. This comic book, illustrated by Gess, has been regarded by French critics as the French reply to Alan Moore's The League of Extraordinary Gentlemen.

This alternative history story is set just before World War II. It describes how an elite band of superhumans, born or created during the First World War, when dubious scientific experiments took place in order to create new superweapons, have now taken control of the capital cities of Europe and try to avoid or cause total war. They are then erased from existence, making been forgotten in European popular culture since then. Its inspiration comes from the idea that the superhero concept had its roots in European pulp literature, whose codes and tropes have been modernized by the modern American comic books. The Chimera Brigade won the Grand Prix de l'Imaginaire 2011 in the newly created comics category.

== Select bibliography ==
=== Comics ===
- La Saison de la Couleuvre (2007–2010)
- Thomas Lestrange (2007)
- The Chimera Brigade (2009–2010, English translation 2014–)
- Masqué (2012–2013)
- L'Homme truqué (2013)
- Metropolis (2014–2017)
- L'Œil de la Nuit (2015–2016)
- L'Homme gribouillé (2018)
- Saint-Elme (2021–2024)
- La Brigade Chimérique – Ultime renaissance (2022)
- Vega (2022)
