= Renée Dunan =

French writer (1892–1936)

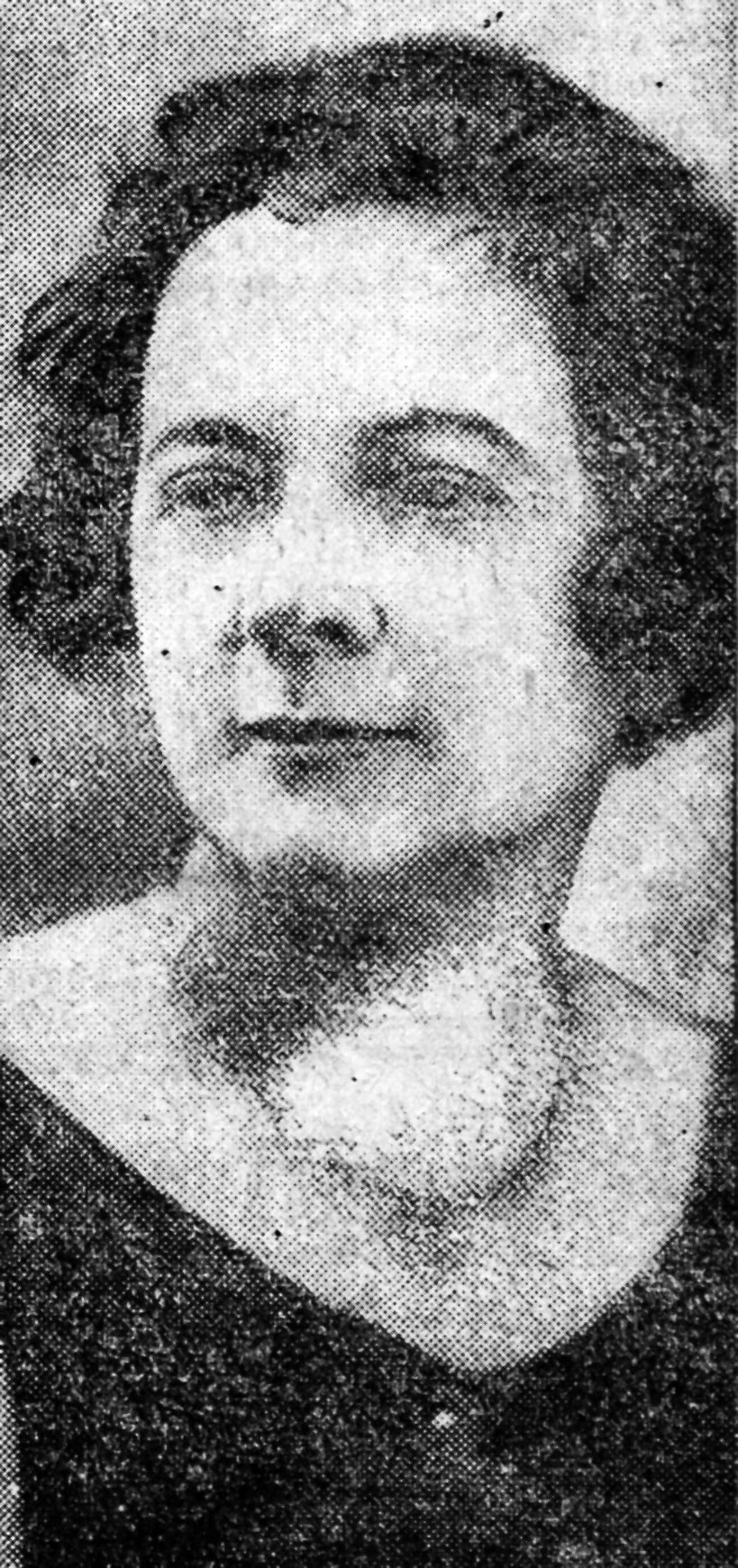
- Portrait of Dunan by Henri Manuel. Taken from a 1924 edition of Paris-soir archived at the Bibliothèque nationale de France
- Born: 1892; Avignon, Vaucluse, Provence-Alpes-Côte d'Azur, French Third Republic
- Died: 8 August 1936 (aged 43–44)
- Spouse: Georges Dunan
- Writing career
- Language: French
- Years active: 1922–1934
- Period: 20th century
- Literary movement: Anarchism

Signature
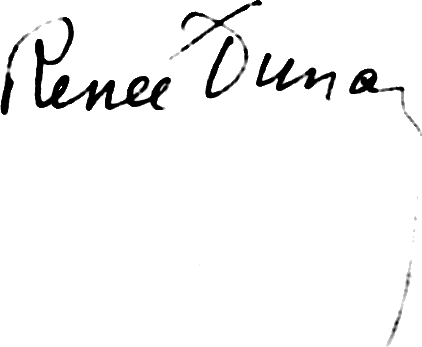

Renée Dunan (1892–1936) was a French writer, critic and poet. She wrote under a number of pseudonyms (appearing in parentheses below in the list of her works).

== Biography ==
Little is known about Dunan, as she left no memoirs, and her correspondence, though far from rare, is scattered. She was born in Avignon in 1892 into a family of industrialists, and died in 1936. After studying with the nuns and before becoming a journalist, she worked in offices and traveled extensively.

Dunan was a feminist and anarchist, as well as being a naturist and pacifist. A member of the Dadaists, she was in contact with André Breton, Philippe Soupault, Louis Aragon, Paul Éluard and Francis Picabia. She wrote around fifty books in a short space of time, most of which were published between 1922 and 1934 (up to eight titles a year). The genres of her novels are varied: erotica, adventure, historical, detective, psychological, esoteric, fantasy, science fiction and prehistoric tales. She published short stories in magazines such as Les Œuvres libres and contributed to at least two issues of L'Endehors, Émile Armand's individualist anarchist journal. In 1928, Le nudisme, revendication révolutionnaire and, in 1933, Le nudisme et la moralité. She wrote an essay on the writer René Boylesve, contributed to Le Crapouillot, and to the monthly periodical Le Sourire.

Dunan published her work under numerous pseudonyms, including Louise Dormienne, M. de Steinthal, Chiquita, Ethel Mac Singh, Luce Borromée, Laure Héron, Ky, A.-R. Layssa (perhaps E.-L. Loayssa?), Esther Sybra, Georges Damian, Léa Saint-Didier, William Stafford. Other pseudonyms attributed to her have not been reliably confirmed but include Marcelle La Pompe, Jean Spaddy, Renée Camera, and Paul Vorgs.

Fabrice Mundzik has suggested that Georges Dunan may have impersonated Renée Dunan in the late 1930s.

The Bibliothèque de l'Arsenal and the Bibliothèque Marguerite Durand in Paris hold fonds on Renée and Georges Dunan.

== Selected works ==
- La triple caresse, 1922
- La Culotte en jersey de soie, 1923
- Une Heure de désir
- La Flèche d'Amour
- Le Stylet en langue de carpe
- Magdeleine
- Mimi Joconde ou la belle sans chemise
- L'Amant trop aimé, (M. de Steinthal)
- Le Prix Lacombyne, 1924
- Baal ou la magicienne passionnée, livre des ensorcellements, 1924
- Le Brigand hongre, 1924
- Kaschmir, Jardin du bonheur, 1925
- La Dernière Jouissance, 1925
- Les Nuits voluptueuses, 1926
- Entre deux caresses, 1927
- Je l'ai échapé belle !, 1927
- Le Sexe et le poignard : la vie ardente de Jules César, 1928
- La confession cynique, 1928
- Éros et Psyché, 1928
- Cantharide, roman de moeurs parisiennes, 1928 (Louis Querelle)
- Les Caprices du sexe ou les Audaces érotiques de Mademoiselle Louise de B…, 1928, (Louis Dormienne)
- L'Extraordinaire aventure de la Papesse Jeanne, 1929
- Le Masque de fer ou l'amour prisonnier, 1929
- Les jeux libertins, 1930
- La Chair au soleil, 1930
- Le Meurtre du milliardaire, 1934
- Moi, poupée, (Spaddy)
- Dévergondages, (Spaddy)
- Colette ou les Amusements de bon ton, 1936, (Jean Spaddy)

== Bibliography ==
- Equy, Felip; Petit, Dominique (14 September 2016). "DUNAN Renée". Dictionnaire des anarchistes. Le Maitron (in French). Paris: Maitron/Editions de l'Atelier.
