= Fabrice Colin =

French author

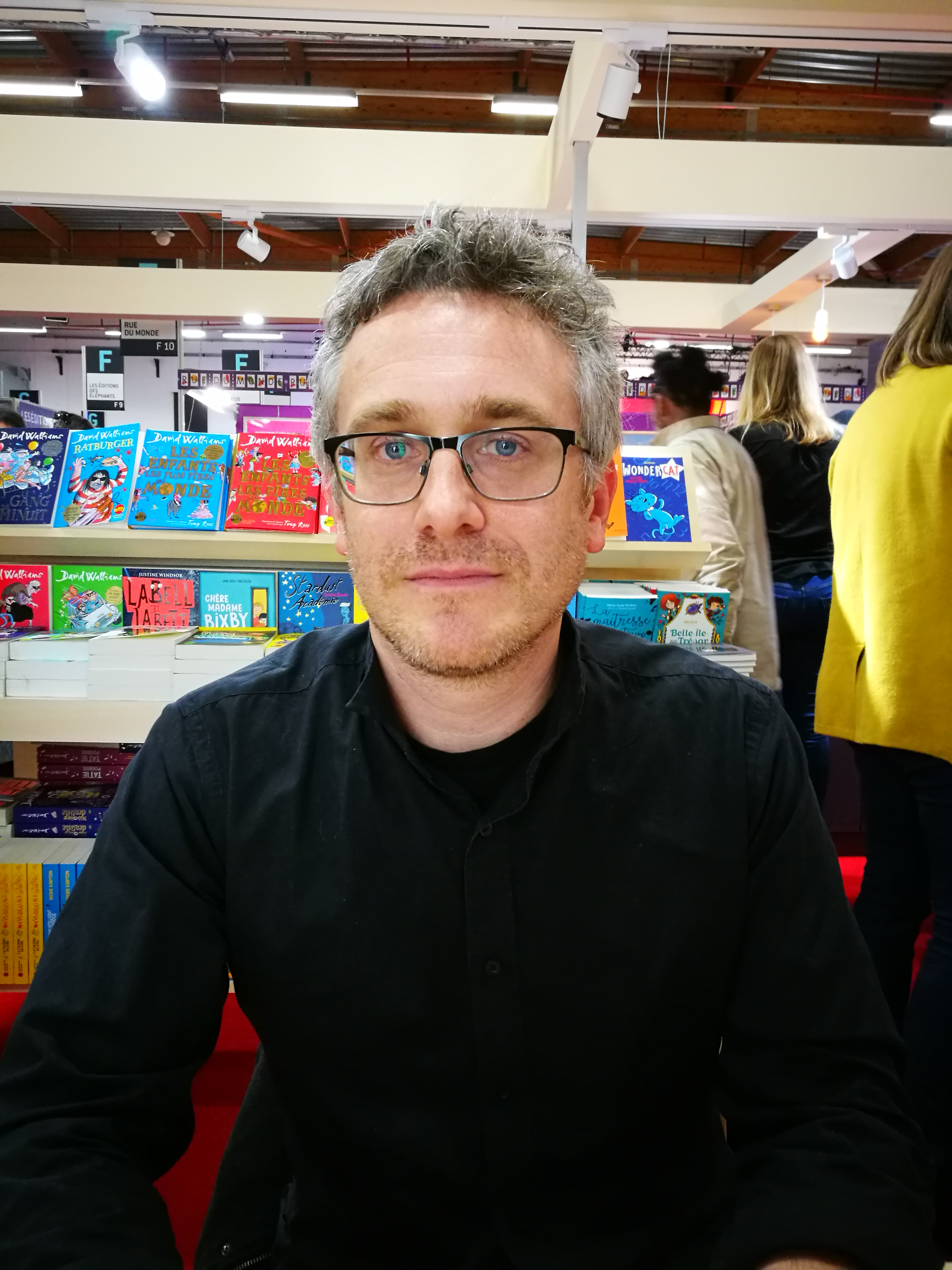
Colin in 2018

Fabrice Colin (born 6 July 1972, in Paris) is a French writer of fantasy, science fiction, and magic realism for adults and children.

== Early life ==
Colin and his family lived in Boumerdès, Algeria from 1976 to 1978.

== Career ==
Colin has been awarded the Grand Prix de l'Imaginaire four times, including for his 2003 novel Dreamericana. Jacques Baudou, writing in Le Monde, described him as "l'un des quatre mousquetaires de la jeune fantasy française" (one of the four Muskeeters of young French fantasy), and said of Les Enfants de la Lune that "Le lecteur aura bien du mal à oublier celui que Fabrice Colin a imaginé, comme il aura du mal à oublier ces Enfants de la lune qui nous laissent au coeur une tenace sensation de perte" (The reader will have a hard time forgetting what Fabrice Colin imagined, just as he will have a hard time forgetting these Children of the Moon who leave us with a persistent feeling of loss in our hearts). Les Enfants de la Lune was awarded the Prix de la PEEP.

== Selected works ==
- Confessions d'un automate mangeur d'opium, with Mathieu Gaborit (1999)
- Les Enfants de la Lune (2001)
- Dreamericana (2003)
- Writer for the comic book series The Chimera Brigade (2009-10)
- La Saga Mendelson, trilogy (2009, 2010)
- En moi le ciel et la terre (2024), novel about Élisa Deroche
