= Fleuve Noir Anticipation =

French science fiction collection

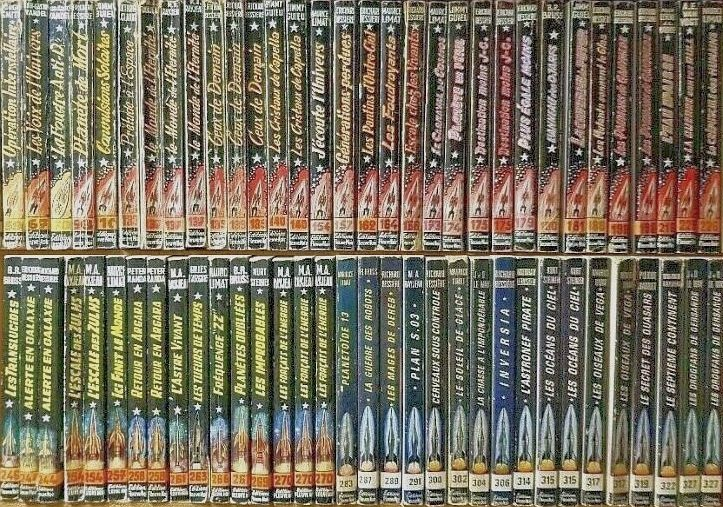
A collection of Fleuve Noir Anticipation books from the 1950s and 60s

Fleuve Noir Anticipation was a science fiction collection by Fleuve Noir, a French publishing company owned now by Editis, which encompassed 2001 novels published from 1951 to 1997. Intended for a broad audience, Anticipation was originally conceived to publish books addressing the rumored increase of technocracy in the French Fourth Republic; but later emphasized space opera and topics of popular interest.

The books exerted great influence on French science fiction and started the career of several noted French writers including Stefan Wul, Kurt Steiner, Louis Thirion, Doris and Jean-Louis Le May, Richard Bessière, Jimmy Guieu and B. R. Bruss.

== History ==
Fleuve Noir Anticipation was initiated in September 1951. It consisted of paperback books sold at a modest price but distinguished by sophisticated cover art by René Brantonne. Topics conformed to the styles of the period, with more than half of the titles published during the 1950s and 60s belonging to the space opera genre.

Fleuve noir cultivated mostly "house writers", notably Jimmy Guieu and F. Richard-Bessière. But it also recruited young French-language authors, and motivated thriller writers to try writing science fiction, such as Georges-Jean Arnaud, who published his first genre texts in the series. According to George Edgar Slusser, Fleuve Noir Anticipation was where the major French science fiction authors of the 1970s published their first novels.

== List of novels ==
Numbering the books published with the imprint Fleuve Noir Anticipation is complicated because some were republished and some were published initially hors série, outside of the series. Lists of the entire series were compiled by Roland C. Wagner in the last volume of the collection and by Alain Douilly.

=== 1950s ===
==== 1951 ====
1. Les Conquérants de l'univers by F. Richard-Bessière
2. À l'assaut du ciel by F. Richard-Bessière
3. Retour du "Météore" by F. Richard-Bessière
4. Planète vagabonde by F. Richard-Bessière
5. Le Pionnier de l'atome by Jimmy Guieu

==== 1952 ====
6. Croisière dans le temps by F. Richard-Bessière
7. Les Chevaliers de l'espace by Jean-Gaston Vandel
8. Au-delà de l'infini by Jimmy Guieu
9. Les Fabricants de Soleil by Vargo Statten
10. Le Satellite artificiel by Jean-Gaston Vandel
11. Les Astres morts by Jean-Gaston Vandel
12. Le Maître de Saturne by Vargo Statten
13. L'Invasion de la Terre by Jimmy Guieu
14. La Planète pétrifiée by Vargo Statten
15. Alerte aux robots ! by Jean-Gaston Vandel
16. La Flamme cosmique by Vargo Statten

==== 1953 ====
17. Frontières du vide by Jean-Gaston Vandel
18. Hantise sur le monde by Jimmy Guieu
19. Le Soleil sous la mer by Jean-Gaston Vandel
20. Course vers Pluton by Vargo Statten
21. Attentat cosmique by Jean-Gaston Vandel
22. L'Univers vivant by Jimmy Guieu
23. Infernale menace by Vargo Statten
24. Incroyable futur by Jean-Gaston Vandel
25. L'Héritage de la Lune by Vargo Statten
26. Agonie des civilisés by Jean-Gaston Vandel
27. La Dimension X by Jimmy Guieu
28. Le Martien vengeur by Vargo Statten
29. Pirate de la Science by Jean-Gaston Vandel

==== 1954 ====
30. Piège dans le temps by Rog Phillips
31. Nous les Martiens by Jimmy Guieu
32. La Bombe "G" by Vargo Statten
33. S.O.S. soucoupes by B. R. Bruss
34. Fuite dans l'inconnu by Jean-Gaston Vandel
35. Îles de l'espace by Arthur C. Clarke
36. La Spirale du temps by Jimmy Guieu
37. Sauvetage sidéral by F. Richard-Bessière
38. Métal de mort by Vargo Statten
39. Naufragés des galaxies by Jean-Gaston Vandel
40. La Guerre des soucoupes by B. R. Bruss
41. Le Monde oublié by Jimmy Guieu
42. À travers les âges by Vargo Statten
43. Territoire robot by Jean-Gaston Vandel
44. Sur la planète rouge by Isaac Asimov, writing as Paul French
45. L'Homme de l'espace by Jimmy Guieu
46. Duel des mondes by Vargo Statten

==== 1955 ====
47. Opération Aphrodite by Jimmy Guieu
48. Les Titans de l'énergie by Jean-Gaston Vandel
49. La Force invisible by Vargo Statten
50. L'Autre univers by Volsted Gridban
51. Commandos de l'espace by Jimmy Guieu
52. Raid sur delta by Jean-Gaston Vandel
53. Heure zéro by Vargo Statten
54. L'Agonie du verre by Jimmy Guieu
55. "S.O.S. Terre" by F. Richard-Bessière
56. Départ pour l'avenir by Jean-Gaston Vandel
57. Les Mines du ciel by Volsted Gridban
58. Univers parallèles by Jimmy Guieu
59. Opération interstellaire by George Oliver Smith
60. Vingt pas dans l'inconnu by F. Richard-Bessière
61. Bureau de l'invisible by Jean-Gaston Vandel

==== 1956 ====
62. Nos ancêtres de l'avenir by Jimmy Guieu
63. Hommes en double by Vargo Statten
64. Feu dans le ciel by F. Richard-Bessière
65. Rideau magnétique by B. R. Bruss
66. Les Voleurs de cerveaux by Murray Leinster
67. Les Voix de l'univers by Jean-Gaston Vandel
68. Révolte des triffides by John Wyndham
69. Objectif Soleil by F. Richard-Bessière
70. Les Monstres du néant by Jimmy Guieu
71. Attaque sub-terrestre by Max-André Rayjean
72. Prisonniers du passé by Jimmy Guieu
73. La Foudre anti-D by Jean-Gaston Vandel
74. L'Étoile fugitive by Vargo Statten
75. Altitude moins X by F. Richard-Bessière
76. Le Vide incandescent by Vector Magroon
77. Le Troisième Bocal by Jean-Gaston Vandel
78. Retour à "O" by Stefan Wul
79. Mystérieux délai by Vargo Statten
80. Les Êtres de feu by Jimmy Guieu
81. Route du néant by F. Richard-Bessière
82. Substance "ARKA" by B. R. Bruss

==== 1957 ====
83. Niourk by Stefan Wul
84. Je reviens de... by Kemmel
85. Cité de l'esprit by F. Richard-Bessière
86. Base spatiale 14 by Max-André Rayjean
87. La Mort de la vie by Jimmy Guieu
88. L'Homme de deux mondes by Vargo Statten
89. Création cosmique by F. Richard-Bessière
90. Rayons pour Sidar by Stefan Wul
91. Le Règne des mutants by Jimmy Guieu
92. La Porte vers l'infini by Leigh Brackett
93. Planète de mort by F. Richard-Bessière
94. Transmission Z by Vargo Statten
95. Créatures des neiges by Jimmy Guieu
96. La Peur géante by Stefan Wul
97. La Deuxième Terre by F. Richard-Bessière
98. Retour à demain by L. Ron Hubbard
99. L'Homme multiple by Vargo Statten
100. Cité Noë n°2 by Jimmy Guieu
101. Via dimension 5 by F. Richard-Bessière
102. Oms en série by Stefan Wul
103. Le Rayon du cube by Jimmy Guieu
104. Les Parias de l'atome by Max-André Rayjean
105. Fléau de l'univers by F. Richard-Bessière
106. Le Temple du passé by Stefan Wul

==== 1958 ====
107. Le Navire étoile by Edwin Charles Tubb
108. Chocs en synthèse by Max-André Rayjean
109. L'Orphelin de Perdide by Stefan Wul
110. Convulsions solaires by Jimmy Guieu
111. Carrefour du temps by F. Richard-Bessière
112. Le Grand Kirn by B. R. Bruss
113. La Mort vivante by Stefan Wul
114. La Folie verte by Max-André Rayjean
115. Réseau dinosaure by Jimmy Guieu
116. L'Autre côté du monde by Murray Leinster
117. Relais Minos III by F. Richard-Bessière
118. La Force sans visage by Jimmy Guieu
119. Piège sur Zarkass by Stefan Wul
120. Opération Espace by Murray Leinster
121. Bang ! by F. Richard-Bessière
122. L'Anneau des invincibles by Max-André Rayjean
123. Les Transformés by John Wyndham
124. Menace d'outre-Terre by Kurt Steiner
125. Verte Destinée by Kenneth Bulmer
126. Zone spatiale interdite by F. Richard-Bessière
127. Soleils : échelle zéro by Max-André Rayjean

==== 1959 ====
128. Qui parle de conquête by Lan Wright
129. Panique dans le vide by F. Richard-Bessière
130. Terminus 1 by Stefan Wul
131. Salamandra by Kurt Steiner
132. Mission dans l'espace by Charles Frederick W. Chilton
133. Prélude à l'espace by Arthur C. Clarke
134. Expédition cosmique by Jimmy Guieu
135. Le Troisième astronef by F. Richard-Bessière
136. Terre… Siècle 24 by B. R. Bruss
137. Le Monde de l'éternité by Max-André Rayjean
138. Odyssée sous contrôle by Stefan Wul
139. Ceux de demain by F. Richard-Bessière
140. Les Cristaux de Capella by Jimmy Guieu
141. Les Enfants du chaos by Maurice Limat
142. Ère cinquième by Max-André Rayjean
143. An... 2391 by B. R. Bruss
144. Réaction déluge by F. Richard-Bessière
145. Piège dans l'espace by Jimmy Guieu
146. Le 32 juillet by Kurt Steiner
147. Le Sang du Soleil by Maurice Limat
148. On a hurlé dans le ciel by F. Richard-Bessière

=== 1960s ===
==== 1960 ====
149. Chasseurs d'hommes by Jimmy Guieu
150. La Troisième race by Poul Anderson
151. Le Péril des hommes by Max-André Rayjean
152. Survie by Peter Randa
153. Terre degré "0" by F. Richard-Bessière
154. J'écoute l'univers by Maurice Limat
155. Aux armes d'Ortog by Kurt Steiner
156. Les Sphères de Rapa-nui by Jimmy Guieu
157. Générations perdues by F. Richard-Bessière
158. "Baroud" by Peter Randa
159. Métro pour l'inconnu by Maurice Limat
160. L'Ère des Biocybs by Jimmy Guieu
161. L'Ultra-univers by Max-André Rayjean
162. Les Pantins d'Outre-ciel by F. Richard-Bessière
163. Expérimental X-35 by Jimmy Guieu
164. Les Foudroyants by Maurice Limat
165. Chirurgiens d'une planète by Gilles d'Argyre
166. Escale chez les vivants by F. Richard-Bessière
167. Invasion "H" by Max-André Rayjean
168. Les Frelons d'or by Peter Randa
169. Les Lunes de Jupiter by F. Richard-Bessière
170. Moi, un robot by Maurice Limat

==== 1961 ====
171. Puissance : facteur 3 by Max-André Rayjean
172. Les Voiliers du soleil by Gilles d'Argyre
173. Le Carnaval du cosmos by Maurice Limat
174. Planète en péril by Jimmy Guieu
175. Destination moins J-C. by F. Richard-Bessière
176. Les Rescapés de demain by Peter Randa
177. Les Magiciens d'Andromède by Max-André Rayjean
178. Océan, mon esclave by Maurice Limat
179. Plus égale moins by F. Richard-Bessière
180. L'Anneau des Djarfs by B. R. Bruss
181. La Caverne du futur by Jimmy Guieu
182. Cycle zéro by Peter Randa
183. Légion alpha by F. Richard-Bessière
184. Message des Vibrants by Maurice Limat
185. Commando de transplantation by Peter Randa
186. Bihil by B. R. Bruss
187. La Grande épouvante by Jimmy Guieu
188. Les Mutants sonnent le glas by F. Richard-Bessière
189. L'Étoile de Goa by Max-André Rayjean
190. Les Damnés de Cassiopée by Maurice Limat
191. L'Invisible alliance by Jimmy Guieu
192. La Guerre des dieux by F. Richard-Bessière

==== 1962 ====
193. Au bout du ciel by Kemmel
194. Fugitif de l'espace by Peter Randa
195. Le Cri des Durups by B. R. Bruss
196. Lumière qui tremble by Maurice Limat
197. Planètes captives by Max-André Rayjean
198. Les Poumons de Ganymède by F. Richard-Bessière
199. Le Secret des Tshengz by Jimmy Guieu
200. Le Mur de la lumière by B. R. Bruss
201. Les Derniers jours de Sol 3 by F. Richard-Bessière
202. Les Éphémères by Peter Randa
203. Opération Ozma by Jimmy Guieu
204. Les Fils de l'espace by Maurice Limat
205. Les 7 anneaux de Rhéa by F. Richard-Bessière
206. S.O.S. Lune by Arthur C. Clarke
207. Naufragés de la Lune by Arthur C. Clarke
208. Les Horls en péril by B. R. Bruss
209. Deucalion by Peter Randa
210. Micro-invasion by F. Richard-Bessière
211. L'Anti-monde by Maurice Limat
212. L'Âge noir de la Terre by Jimmy Guieu
213. Les Apprentis sorciers by Peter Randa
214. La Mort vient des étoiles by F. Richard-Bessière
215. Dans le vent du cosmos by Maurice Limat
216. L'Eau épaisse by Philip Levene and Joseph Lawrence Morrissey

==== 1963 ====
217. L'Oasis du rêve by Max-André Rayjean
218. Les Créatures d'Hypnôs by Maurice Limat
219. Mission "T" by Jimmy Guieu
220. Les Ancêtres by Peter Randa
221. Terrom, âge "un" by Max-André Rayjean
222. Visa pour Antarès by F. Richard-Bessière
223. La Guerre contre le Rull by Alfred Elton Van Vogt
224. Les Forbans de l'espace by Jimmy Guieu
225. Complot Vénus-Terre by B. R. Bruss
226. Le Crépuscule des humains by Maurice Limat
227. Plate-forme de l'éternité by Peter Randa
228. Les Jardins de l'apocalypse by F. Richard-Bessière
229. La Fièvre rouge by Max-André Rayjean
230. Le Sang vert by Maurice Limat
231. Projet "King" by Jimmy Guieu
232. Planète à vendre by F. Richard-Bessière
233. L'Otarie bleue by B. R. Bruss
234. Humains de nulle part by Peter Randa
235. Les Sortilèges d'Altaïr by Maurice Limat
236. Rendez-vous sur un monde perdu by Arthur Bertram Chandler
237. Les Destructeurs by Jimmy Guieu
238. Pas de Gonia pour les Gharkandes by F. Richard-Bessière
239. Une mouche nommée Drésa by B. R. Bruss

==== 1964 ====
240. Projet "Kozna" by Max-André Rayjean
241. L'Étoile de Satan by Maurice Limat
242. Les Portes de Thulé by Jimmy Guieu
243. Le Long voyage by Gilles d'Argyre
244. Alerte en galaxie by F. Richard-Bessière
245. Sédition by Peter Randa
246. Les Translucides by B. R. Bruss
247. Round végétal by Max-André Rayjean
248. Échec au Soleil by Maurice Limat
249. La Loi de Mandralor by Peter Randa
250. Un futur pour M. Smith by F. Richard-Bessière
251. L'Astéroïde noir by B. R. Bruss
252. Particule zéro by Maurice Limat
253. Zone de rupture by Peter Randa
254. L'Escale des Zulhs by Max-André Rayjean
255. La Planète géante by F. Richard-Bessière
256. Le Grand feu by B. R. Bruss
257. Ici finit le monde by Maurice Limat
258. Retour en Argara by Peter Randa
259. N'accusez pas le ciel by F. Richard-Bessière

==== 1965 ====
260. Le Soleil s'éteint by B. R. Bruss
261. L'Astre vivant by Max-André Rayjean
262. Les Soleils noirs by Maurice Limat
263. Les Tueurs de temps by Gilles d'Argyre
264. Les Pionniers du cosmos by F. Richard-Bessière
265. Reconquête by Peter Randa
266. Fréquence "ZZ" by Maurice Limat
267. Planètes oubliées by B. R. Bruss
268. Le Chemin des étoiles by F. Richard-Bessière
269. Les Improbables by Kurt Steiner
270. Les Forçats de l'énergie by Max-André Rayjean
271. Qui suis-je ? by Peter Randa
272. Disparus dans l'espace by Peter Randa
273. La Planète glacée by B. R. Bruss
274. Le Flambeau du monde by Maurice Limat
275. Le Cerveau de Silstar by Max-André Rayjean
276. Le Secret des Antarix by Peter Randa
277. L'Énigme des Phtas by B. R. Bruss
278. Methoodias by Maurice Limat
279. Les Maîtres du silence by F. Richard-Bessière
280. Je m'appelle... "tous" by F. Richard-Bessière
281. A comme Andromède by John Elliot and Fred Hoyle

==== 1966 ====
282. Andromède revient by John Elliot and Fred Hoyle
283. Planétoïde 13 by Maurice Limat
284. Le Zoo des Astors by Max-André Rayjean
285. Les Limiers de l'infini by Pierre Barbet

H.S Opération Astrée by Clark Darlton and Karl-Herbert Scheer

286. La Solitude des dieux by Peter Randa
287. La Guerre des robots by B. R. Bruss
288. Rien qu'une étoile by Maurice Limat
289. Les Mages de Dereb by F. Richard-Bessière
290. La Terre a peur by Karl-Herbert Scheer
291. Plan S.03 by Max-André Rayjean
292. Les Cavernicoles de Wolf by Pierre Barbet
293. Agent spatial n°1 by F. Richard-Bessière
294. L'Espace noir by B. R. Bruss
295. La Milice des mutants by Karl-Herbert Scheer
296. La Terre n'est pas ronde by Maurice Limat
297. Commando du non-retour by Peter Randa
298. Bases sur Vénus by Karl-Herbert Scheer
299. Vagues d'invasion by Peter Randa
300. Cerveaux sous contrôle by F. Richard-Bessière
301. La Créature éparse by B. R. Bruss
302. Le Soleil de glace by Maurice Limat
303. Les Clés de l'univers by Max-André Rayjean
304. La Chasse à l'impondérable by Doris Le May and Jean-Louis Le May
305. Objectif Tamax by Peter Randa
306. Inversia by F. Richard-Bessière
307. Les Vainqueurs de Véga by Clark Darlton and Karl-Herbert Scheer

==== 1967 ====
308. Le Dieu couleur de nuit by Maurice Limat
309. L'Étoile du néant by Pierre Barbet
310. La Vermine du Lion by F. Carsac
311. Les Anti-hommes by Max-André Rayjean
312. L'Oenips d'Orlon by Doris Le May and Jean-Louis Le May
313. La Forteresse des six lunes by Clark Darlton and Karl-Herbert Scheer
314. L'Astronef pirate by Murray Leinster
315. Les Océans du ciel by Kurt Steiner
316. La Grande dérive by Peter Randa
317. Les Oiseaux de Véga by Maurice Limat
318. Le Mystère des Sups by B. R. Bruss
319. Le Secret des Quasars by Pierre Barbet
320. Cette lueur qui venait des ténèbres by F. Richard-Bessière
321. La Quête cosmique by Clark Darlton and Karl-Herbert Scheer
322. Le Septième continent by Max-André Rayjean
323. Les Survivants de Kor by Peter Randa
324. L'Étrange planète Orga by B. R. Bruss
325. Les Portes de l'aurore by Maurice Limat
326. Les Glaces de Gol by Clark Darlton and Karl-Herbert Scheer
327. Les Drogfans de Gersande by Doris Le May and Jean-Louis Le May
328. Le Trappeur galactique by B. R. Bruss
329. L'Enfer dans le ciel by F. Richard-Bessière
330. Hallali cosmique by Pierre Barbet
331. Les Ides de Mars by Peter Randa
332. Le Traître de Tuglan by Clark Darlton and Karl-Herbert Scheer
333. Le Quatrième futur by Max-André Rayjean
334. La Nuit des Géants by Maurice Limat
335. Chaos sur la genèse by F. Richard-Bessière
336. La Jungle d'Araman by Peter Randa
337. Le Retour des dieux by Jimmy Guieu

==== 1968 ====
338. Quand l'uranium vint à manquer by B. R. Bruss
339. L'Odyssée du Delta by Doris Le May and Jean-Louis Le May
340. Le Maître des mutants by Clark Darlton and Karl-Herbert Scheer
341. La Planète de feu by Maurice Limat
342. Ne touchez pas aux Borloks by F. Richard-Bessière
343. Les Sept sceaux du cosmos by Jimmy Guieu
344. Contact "Z" by Max-André Rayjean
345. La Planète des Cristophons by Pierre Barbet
346. La Révolte des inexistants by Peter Randa
347. Message pour l'avenir by Doris Le May and Jean-Louis Le May
348. L'Espionne galactique by B. R. Bruss
349. Le Piège à pirates by Clark Darlton and Karl-Herbert Scheer
350. Évolution magnétique by Pierre Barbet
351. Les Sirènes de Faô by Maurice Limat
352. Joklun-N'Ghar la maudite by Jimmy Guieu
353. Civilisation Oméga by Max-André Rayjean
354. Les Stols by Louis Thirion
355. L'Escale des dieux by Peter Randa
356. La Planète introuvable by B. R. Bruss
357. Le Sceptre du hasard by Gilles d'Argyre
358. La Planète des Optyrox by Doris Le May and Jean-Louis Le May
359. Tout commencera... hier by F. Richard-Bessière
360. La Terreur invisible by Jimmy Guieu
361. L'Empereur de New-York by Clark Darlton and Karl-Herbert Scheer
362. Le Septième nuage by Maurice Limat
363. L'Héritier des Sars by Peter Randa
364. Le Zor-Ko de fer by Max-André Rayjean
365. Des hommes, des hommes... et encore des hommes by F. Richard-Bessière
366. Les Enfants d'Alga by B. R. Bruss
367. Refuge cosmique by Jimmy Guieu
368. Arel d'Adamante by Doris Le May and Jean-Louis Le May
369. Les Aventuriers de l'espace by Peter Randa

==== 1969 ====
370. Ici l'infini by Maurice Limat
371. Vikings de l'espace by Pierre Barbet
372. La Machine venue d'ailleurs by F. Richard-Bessière
373. L'Étoile en exil by Clark Darlton and Karl-Herbert Scheer
374. Métalikus by Maurice Limat
375. L'An un des Kréols by Max-André Rayjean
376. Ortog et les ténèbres by Kurt Steiner
377. Les Naufragés de l'Alkinoos by Louis Thirion
378. La Grande chasse des Kadjars by Peter Randa
379. Le Treizième signe du zodiaque by Maurice Limat
380. Cauchemar dans l'invisible by F. Richard-Bessière
381. La Neige bleue by Gérard Marcy
382. Solution de continuité by Doris Le May and Jean-Louis Le May
383. Les Chimères de Séginus by Pierre Barbet
384. L'Ordre vert by Jimmy Guieu
385. Mutants en mission by Clark Darlton and Karl-Herbert Scheer
386. Les Centauriens sont fous by B. R. Bruss
387. Relais "Kera" by Max-André Rayjean
388. Les Enfants de l'histoire by Kurt Steiner
389. Demain le froid by Doris Le May and Jean-Louis Le May
390. L'Homme éparpillé by Peter Randa
391. Flammes sur Titan by Maurice Limat
392. L'Exilé du temps by Pierre Barbet
393. Les Whums se vengent by Louis Thirion
394. Parle, robot ! by B. R. Bruss
395. Traquenard sur Kenndor by Jimmy Guieu
396. Les Damnés d'Altaban by Peter Randa
397. L'Offensive d'oubli by Clark Darlton and Karl-Herbert Scheer
398. Tempête sur Coxxi by Maurice Limat
399. La Quête du Frohle d'Esylée by Doris Le May and Jean-Louis Le May
400. Les Marteaux de Vulcain by F. Richard-Bessière
401. Les Boucles du temps by Peter Randa
402. Demain : l'Apocalypse by Jimmy Guieu
403. S.O.S. cerveaux by Max-André Rayjean

=== 1970s ===
==== 1970 ====
404. Étoiles en perdition by Pierre Barbet
405. Garadania by Georges Murcie
406. On demande un cobaye by F. Richard-Bessière
407. L'Arche du temps by Jimmy Guieu
408. La Plongée des corsaires d'Hermos by Doris Le May and Jean-Louis Le May
409. La Force secrète by Gérard Marcy
410. Enjeu Déterna by Peter Randa
411. Le Voleur de rêves by Maurice Limat
412. A l'assaut d'Arkonis by Clark Darlton and Karl-Herbert Scheer
413. Les Maîtres des pulsars by Pierre Barbet
414. Prisonniers du temps by Max-André Rayjean
415. Équipages en péril by Pierre Courcel
416. La Mission d'Eno Granger by Doris Le May and Jean-Louis Le May
417. Plus loin qu'Orion by Maurice Limat
418. La Tache noire by Robert Clauzel
419. La Planète aux oasis by B. R. Bruss
420. Et le dernier humain mourut by Peter Randa
421. La Menace des Moofs by Clark Darlton and Karl-Herbert Scheer
422. Les Prisonniers de Kazor by F. Richard-Bessière
423. La Planète maudite by Paul Béra
424. Le Disque rayé by Kurt Steiner
425. Le Triangle de la mort by Jimmy Guieu
426. Les Grognards d'Eridan by Pierre Barbet
427. Ysée-A by Louis Thirion
428. Le Rendez-vous aux 300 000 by Georges Murcie
429. Une si belle planète by B. R. Bruss
430. Les Cosmatelots de Lupus by Maurice Limat
431. Retour au néant by Max-André Rayjean
432. La Trêve du sacre by Peter Randa
433. La Planète piégée by Clark Darlton and Karl-Herbert Scheer
434. Aux frontières de l'impossible by Robert Clauzel
435. L'Agonie de la Voie lactée by Pierre Barbet
436. Irimanthe by Doris Le May and Jean-Louis Le May
437. Base "Djéos" by Max-André Rayjean
438. Quatre "diables" au paradis by F. Richard-Bessière
439. Plan catapulte by Jimmy Guieu
440. L'Univers des Torgaux by Peter Randa
441. Et la comète passa by Maurice Limat

==== 1971 ====
442. Vengeance en symbiose by Gérard Marcy
443. Les Êtres de lumière by Paul Béra
444. Les Montagnes mouvantes by Doris Le May and Jean-Louis Le May
445. Les Méduses de Moofar by Clark Darlton and Karl-Herbert Scheer
446. Les Conquistadores d'Andromède by Pierre Barbet
447. Les Orgues de Satan by Jimmy Guieu
448. Les Harnils by B. R. Bruss
449. Le Cycle du recommencement by Peter Randa
450. La Puissance de l'ordre by Georges Murcie
451. La Seconde vie by Max-André Rayjean
452. La Guerre des Gruulls by Alphonse Brutsche
453. Un astronef nommé Péril by Maurice Limat
454. Bases d'invasion by Pierre Courcel
455. L'Horreur tombée du ciel by Robert Clauzel
456. Sterga la noire by Louis Thirion
457. Le Rideau de brume by André Caroff
458. Terre d'arriérés by Paul Béra
459. La Voix qui venait d'ailleurs by Jimmy Guieu
460. Le Dépositaire de Thana by Peter Randa
461. Concerto pour l'inconnu (opus 71) by F. Richard-Bessière
462. Les Landes d'Achernar by Doris Le May and Jean-Louis Le May
463. Le Transmetteur de Ganymède by Pierre Barbet
464. Un de la galaxie by Maurice Limat
465. Les Grottes de Gom by Clark Darlton and Karl-Herbert Scheer
466. "Cellule 217" by Max-André Rayjean
467. Les Rescapés du futur by Georges Murcie
468. La Planète qui n'existait pas by Robert Clauzel
469. Les Croisés de Mara by G.-J. Arnaud
470. Le Grand mythe by Jimmy Guieu
471. Azraëc de Virgo by Pierre Barbet
472. Le Grand marginal by B. R. Bruss
473. La Loi d'Algor by F. Richard-Bessière
474. Moissons du futur by Maurice Limat
475. Les Trophées de la cité morte by Doris Le May and Jean-Louis Le May
476. Les Astronefs du pouvoir by Peter Randa
477. Les Psycors de Pââl Zuick by Max-André Rayjean
478. Planète de désolation by Peter Randa
479. A quoi songent les Psyborgs ? by Pierre Barbet
480. La Charnière du temps by Jimmy Guieu
481. Destination épouvante by Robert Clauzel
482. Variations sur une machine by F. Richard-Bessière
483. Motel 113 by Georges Murcie
484. Les Cristaux de Sigel Alpha by Doris Le May and Jean-Louis Le May
485. La Planète aux chimères by Maurice Limat

==== 1972 ====
486. Luhora by B. R. Bruss
487. Escales forcées by Pierre Courcel
488. Adieu, Céred by Jacques Hoven
489. La Guerre des Nosiars by André Caroff
490. "Année 500.000" by Daniel Piret
491. Le Missile hyperspatial by Gérard Marcy
492. Les Immortels by Peter Randa
493. Les Déracinés d'Humania by Dan Dastier
494. L'Empire du Baphomet by Pierre Barbet
495. L'Envoyé d'Alpha by Jan de Fast
496. Enjeu cosmique by Jimmy Guieu
497. Quand le ciel s'embrase by Maurice Limat
498. Espace interdit by Paul Béra
499. Comme il était au commencement... by Robert Clauzel
500. Vacances spatiales by Doris Le May and Jean-Louis Le May
501. Le Vaisseau de l'ailleurs by F. Richard-Bessière
502. La Bataille de Bételgeuse by Clark Darlton and Karl-Herbert Scheer
503. Objectif : la Terre ! by Georges Murcie
504. Les Maîtres de la galaxie by Jimmy Guieu
505. La Septième saison by Pierre Suragne
506. Les Statues vivantes by Max-André Rayjean
507. Les Pêcheurs d'étoiles by Maurice Limat
508. Les Insurgés de Laucor by Pierre Barbet
509. Les Monarques de Bi by G.-J. Arnaud
510. Le Grand cristal de Terk by Peter Randa
511. Les Êtres vagues by B. R. Bruss
512. L'Arbre de cristal by Max-André Rayjean
513. Les Êtres du néant by André Caroff
514. La Planète assassinée by Jan de Fast
515. Les Hydnes de Loriscamp by Doris Le May and Jean-Louis Le May
516. Énergie - 500 by F. Richard-Bessière
517. Race de conquérants by Paul Béra
518. Le Monde de l'incréé by Robert Clauzel
519. Mal Iergo le dernier by Pierre Suragne
520. Le Tunnelumière by Georges Murcie
521. Les Rescapés du néant by Jimmy Guieu
522. La Loi des ancêtres by Peter Randa
523. La Planète empoisonnée by Pierre Barbet
524. Les Fruits du Métaxylia by Doris Le May and Jean-Louis Le May
525. Les Deux soleils de Canaé by Daniel Piret
526. L'Empereur de métal by Maurice Limat
527. La Galaxie engloutie by Robert Clauzel
528. L'Autre passé by Max-André Rayjean
529. La Planète infernale by André Caroff
530. L'Enfant qui marchait sur le ciel by Pierre Suragne
531. Quand les soleils s'éteignent by F. Richard-Bessière
532. Tremplins d'étoiles by Pierre Barbet
533. Les Secrets d'Hypnoz by Dan Dastier
534. Les Témoins de l'éternité by Peter Randa
535. Les Créateurs d'Ulnar by Doris Le May and Jean-Louis Le May
536. Les Grottes de Phobos by Georges Murcie

==== 1973 ====
537. Robinson du néant by Maurice Limat
538. Lazaret 3 by G.-J. Arnaud
539. Infection focale by Jan de Fast
540. Le Dieu de lumière by Alphonse Brutsche
541. L'Amiral d'Arkonis by Clark Darlton and Karl-Herbert Scheer
542. La Loi du cube by Max-André Rayjean
543. Le Secret d'Ipavar by Louis Thirion
544. La Planète enchantée by Pierre Barbet
545. A l'aube du dernier jour... by Robert Clauzel
546. Le Rendez-vous de Nankino by Peter Randa
547. La Mission effacée by Jimmy Guieu
548. Il était une fois dans l'espace by Jacques Hoven
549. La Nef des dieux by Pierre Suragne
550. L'Empreinte de Shark Ergan by Doris Le May and Jean-Louis Le May
551. Guet-apens sur Zifur by B. R. Bruss
552. Les Possédés de Wolf 359 by Georges Murcie
553. Ceux des ténèbres by André Caroff
554. Les Égarés du temps by Daniel Piret
555. 1973... et la suite by F. Richard-Bessière
556. S.O.S.... ici, nulle part ! by Maurice Limat
557. Bulles d'univers by Paul Béra
558. Messies pour l'avenir by Dan Dastier
559. Les Cathédrales d'espace-temps by Robert Clauzel
560. L'Impossible retour by Jan de Fast
561. Les Marées du temps by Peter Randa
562. Brang by B. R. Bruss
563. Liane de Noldaz by Pierre Barbet
564. Dame Lueen by Doris Le May and Jean-Louis Le May
565. La Révolte de Gerkanol by Max-André Rayjean
566. Mecanic Jungle by Pierre Suragne
567. L'Exilé d'Akros by André Caroff
568. Opération Neptune by Jimmy Guieu
569. Mission au futur antérieur by Georges Murcie
570. Les Replis du temps by Dan Dastier
571. Le Sérum de survie by Clark Darlton and Karl-Herbert Scheer
572. Les Bioniques d'Atria by Pierre Barbet
573. La Terrible expérience de Peter Home by Robert Clauzel
574. L'Étoile du silence by Maurice Limat
575. Les Disques de Biem-Kara by Daniel Piret
576. Génération spontanée by Peter Randa
577. Et puis les loups viendront by Pierre Suragne
578. Les Germes du Chaos by Jimmy Guieu
579. Quatrième mutation by Jan de Fast
580. Arlyada by Georges Murcie
581. Les Trésors de Chrysoréade by Doris Le May and Jean-Louis Le May
582. Le Bâtard d'Orion by Pierre Barbet
583. Les Étoiles meurent aussi… by Robert Clauzel
584. La Planète aux diamants by Dan Dastier
585. Sombre est l'espace by Jacques Hoven
586. Le Spectre du surmutant by Clark Darlton and Karl-Herbert Scheer
587. Le Monde figé by Max-André Rayjean
588. La Jungle de fer by Maurice Limat
589. La Planète perdue by Peter Randa
590. Métrocéan 2031 by Louis Thirion
591. Les Seigneurs de la nuit by F. Richard-Bessière

==== 1974 ====
592. Les Gardiens de l'Almucantar by Doris Le May and Jean-Louis Le May
593. Cancer dans le cosmos by Jan de Fast
594. Vahanara by Georges Murcie
595. Le Maître de Phallaté by Daniel Piret
596. Brebis galeuses by Kurt Steiner
597. La Fantastique énigme de Pentarosa by Robert Clauzel
598. L'Univers des Géons by Pierre Barbet
599. Chevaliers du temps by Louis Thirion
600. Les Tueurs d'âme by Jan de Fast
601. Les Exilés d'Elgir by Clark Darlton and Karl-Herbert Scheer
602. Les Veilleurs de Poséidon by Jimmy Guieu
603. Oméga 5 by Georges Murcie
604. Les Fils de l'Atlantide by Daniel Piret
605. Complot à travers le temps by Peter Randa
606. L'Invasion des invisibles by Clark Darlton and Karl-Herbert Scheer
607. Les Immortels de Céphalia by Dan Dastier
608. Vertige cosmique by Maurice Limat
609. Magiciens galactiques by Pierre Barbet
610. Les Feux de Siris by Max-André Rayjean
611. Yétig de la nef monde by Doris Le May and Jean-Louis Le May
612. Mais si les papillons trichent by Pierre Suragne
613. Le Bagne de Rostos by André Caroff
614. La Mort surgit du néant by Jan de Fast
615. Les Ruches de M.112 by F. Richard-Bessière
616. Le Poids du passé by Clark Darlton and Karl-Herbert Scheer
617. Le Nuage qui vient de la mer by Robert Clauzel
618. L'Exilé de Xantar by Jimmy Guieu
619. Métamorphose by Peter Randa
620. Les Mutants de Pshuuria by Dan Dastier
621. Naître ou ne pas naître by Daniel Piret
622. Les Mercenaires de Rychna by Pierre Barbet
623. Planète polluée by Paul Béra
624. Stellan by Doris Le May and Jean-Louis Le May
625. Le Dieu truqué by Pierre Suragne
626. La Citadelle cachée by Clark Darlton and Karl-Herbert Scheer
627. Les Intemporels by Jacques Hoven
628. De l'autre côté de l'atome by Georges Murcie
629. Le Secret des Cyborgs by Max-André Rayjean
630. Le Maître du temps by Jimmy Guieu
631. Le Temps cyclothymique by Alphonse Brutsche
632. Les Sept cryptes d'hibernation by Peter Randa
633. Ballade pour presque un homme by Pierre Suragne
634. La Drogue des étoiles by Jan de Fast
635. L'Iceberg rouge by Maurice Limat
636. Les Sources de l'infini by F. Richard-Bessière
637. Quand les deux soleils se coucheront by Jan de Fast
638. Croisade stellaire by Pierre Barbet
639. Projet Apocalypse by Georges Murcie
640. Ahouvati le Kobek by Daniel Piret
641. Les Traquenards du temps by Clark Darlton and Karl-Herbert Scheer
642. L'Espace d'un éclair by Maurice Limat
643. Plate-forme Epsilon by Robert Clauzel
644. Le Grand retour by Max-André Rayjean
645. Les Massacres du commencement by Peter Randa
646. Quand la machine s'emmêle by F. Richard-Bessière

==== 1975 ====
647. Manipulations psi by Jimmy Guieu
648. La Planète aux deux soleils by Gabriel Jan
649. Le Grand passage by Daniel Piret
650. Un pilote a disparu by Doris Le May and Jean-Louis Le May
651. Penelcoto by B. R. Bruss
652. Sécession à Procyon by Jan de Fast
653. Barrière vivante by Max-André Rayjean
654. Le Bagne d'Edenia by Jean-Pierre Garen
655. La Folie du capitaine Sangor by Georges Murcie
656. Délos a disparu by Clark Darlton and Karl-Herbert Scheer
657. Le Vieux et son implant by Paul Béra
658. Les Portes du monde alpha by Dan Dastier
659. La Barrière du grand isolement by Peter Randa
660. La Révolte des Logars by Yann Menez
661. Les Hordes de Céphée by Jan de Fast
662. Les Pièges de Koondra by Jimmy Guieu
663. Opération désespoir by Georges Murcie
664. Échec à la raison by Doris Le May and Jean-Louis Le May
665. Les Sub-terrestres by Maurice Limat
666. L'Agonie d'Atlantis by Clark Darlton and Karl-Herbert Scheer
667. La Saga des étoiles by Jan de Fast
668. Le Tell de la puissance by Daniel Piret
669. Les Résidus du temps by Peter Randa
670. L'Astronef rouge by Max-André Rayjean
671. La Moisson de Myrtha VII by Clark Darlton and Karl-Herbert Scheer
672. Et la nuit garda son secret by Robert Clauzel
673. La Nymphe de l'espace by Pierre Barbet
674. Les Fugitifs de Zwolna by Jimmy Guieu
675. Claine et les Solandres by Doris Le May and Jean-Louis Le May
676. Où finissent les étoiles ? by Maurice Limat
677. Les Naufragés du temps by Georges Murcie
678. Dans la gueule du Vortex by Jan de Fast
679. Pandémoniopolis by Gabriel Jan
680. Le Onzième satellite by Daniel Piret
681. Les Soleils de Siamed by Clark Darlton and Karl-Herbert Scheer
682. La Brigade du grand sauvetage by Peter Randa
683. Le Salut de l'empire Shekara by Jan de Fast
684. Princesse des étoiles by Robert Clauzel
685. La Nuit des Morphos by Dominique Rocher
686. Les Hybrides de Michina by Georges Murcie
687. Les Egrégores by Daniel Piret
688. Les Krolls de Vorlna by Jimmy Guieu
689. Maelström de Kjor by Maurice Limat
690. Les Zwüls de Réhan by Gabriel Jan
691. Le Rescapé de la Terre by Paul-Jean Hérault
692. Ségrégaria by Max-André Rayjean
693. La Vénus de l'Himménadrock by Jacques Hoven
694. Tourbillon temporel by Jan de Fast
695. Vendredi, by exemple... by Pierre Suragne
696. Les Portes du futur by F. Richard-Bessière
697. Zarnia, dimension folie by Dan Dastier
698. L'Enjeu galactique by Peter Randa
699. Il est minuit à l'univers by Maurice Limat
700. Et la nuit fut... by F. Richard-Bessière
701. L'Errant de l'éternité by Clark Darlton and Karl-Herbert Scheer

==== 1976 ====
702. Sakkara by Daniel Piret
703. Orage magnétique by Jean-Pierre Garen
704. L'Homme de lumière by Georges Murcie
705. Nurnah aux temples d'or by Jan de Fast
706. La Revanche du régent by Clark Darlton and Karl-Herbert Scheer
707. Le Bouclier de Boongoha by Jimmy Guieu
708. Orbite d'attente by Vincent Gallaix
709. Les Walkyries des Pléiades by Jan de Fast
710. La Nuit est morte by Paul Béra
711. Les Survivants de Miderabi by Daniel Piret
712. Les Géants de Komor by Max-André Rayjean
713. Une porte sur ailleurs by Jan de Fast
714. Les Bâtisseurs du monde by Paul-Jean Hérault
715. Ce monde qui n'est plus nôtre by Doris Le May and Jean-Louis Le May
716. Patrouilleur du néant by Pierre Barbet
717. La Lumière d'ombre by Maurice Limat
718. La Stase achronique by Jimmy Guieu
719. Zoomby by Vincent Gallaix
720. La Chair des Vohuz by Gabriel Jan
721. Vae Victis ! by Daniel Piret
722. Mâa by Georges Murcie
723. Les Damnés de l'espace by Jean-Pierre Garen
724. Périls sur la galaxie by Peter Randa
725. La Loi galactique by Jan de Fast
726. Recrues pour le régent by Clark Darlton and Karl-Herbert Scheer
727. La Dernière mort by Daniel Piret
728. Transit pour l'infini by Christian Mantey
729. Plus jamais le "France" by Doris Le May and Jean-Louis Le May
730. La Colonie perdue by Jimmy Guieu
731. Par le temps qui court... by Jan de Fast
732. Astres enchaînés by Maurice Limat
733. Un jour, l'oubli ... by Georges Murcie
734. L'Éternité moins une… by Peter Randa
735. Le Feu de Klo-Ora by Dan Dastier
736. Énigme aux confins by Doris Le May and Jean-Louis Le May
737. Les Hommes marqués by Gilles Thomas
738. Les Tziganes du Triangle austral by Jan de Fast
739. Le Rescapé du Gaurisankar by Daniel Piret
740. Terreur sur Izaad by Gabriel Jan
741. Comme un liseron by Paul Béra
742. L'Autoroute sauvage by Gilles Thomas
743. Le Prix du pouvoir by Clark Darlton and Karl-Herbert Scheer
744. La Terre, échec et mat by Robert Clauzel
745. L'Ophrys et les Protistes by Doris Le May and Jean-Louis Le May
746. Les Assaillants by Peter Randa
747. Attaque parallèle by Jean-Pierre Garen
748. S.O.S. Andromède by Jan de Fast
749. Les Incréés by Maurice Limat
750. Pas même un dieu by Jean Mazarin
751. L'An 22704 des Wans by Gabriel Jan
752. L'Être polyvalent by Georges Murcie
753. Les Germes de l'infini by Max-André Rayjean
754. Le Manuscrit by Daniel Piret
755. Black planet by Christian Mantey
756. Ambassade galactique by Pierre Barbet
757. Elteor by Peter Randa
758. Miroirs d'univers by Maurice Limat
759. Il était une voile parmi les étoiles by Doris Le May and Jean-Louis Le May
760. La Planète suppliciée by Robert Clauzel
761. Sogol by Daniel Piret
762. La Déroute des Droufs by Clark Darlton and Karl-Herbert Scheer

==== 1977 ====
763. Le Cylindre d'épouvante by Robert Clauzel
764. La Planète des normes by Jan de Fast
765. La Révolte de Zarmou by Georges Murcie
766. Enfants d'univers by Gabriel Jan
767. La Croix des décastés by Gilles Thomas
768. Cap sur la Terre by Maurice Limat
769. Le Général des Galaxies by Jean Mazarin
770. Un pas de trop vers les étoiles by Jan de Fast
771. Démonia, planète maudite by Piet Legay
772. La Mort en billes by Gilles Thomas
773. Déjà presque la fin by F. Richard-Bessière
774. Rhodan renie Rhodan by Clark Darlton and Karl-Herbert Scheer
775. Les Brumes du Sagittaire by Frank Dartal
776. La Planète folle by Paul-Jean Hérault
777. L'Étoile Regatonne by Doris Le May and Jean-Louis Le May
778. Les Irréels by Max-André Rayjean
779. La Lumière de Thot by Jimmy Guieu
780. L'Immortel et les invisibles by Clark Darlton and Karl-Herbert Scheer
781. Xurantar by Daniel Piret
782. Involution interdite by Jan de Fast
783. Le Non-être by Georges Murcie
784. Le Ciel sous la Terre by Robert Clauzel
785. Défi dans l'uniformité by Doris Le May and Jean-Louis Le May
786. Maloa by Gabriel Jan
787. Les Arches de Noé by Peter Randa
788. Quand elles viendront by Chris Burger
789. Les Diablesses de Qiwâm by Maurice Limat
790. Un fils pour la lignée by Jean Mazarin
791. Mondes en dérive by Jan de Fast
792. Les Métamorphes de Moluk by Clark Darlton and Karl-Herbert Scheer
793. Pari-Egar by Georges Murcie
794. Le Secret des initiés by Jean-Pierre Garen
795. Le Sursis d'Hypnos by Piet Legay
796. Les Métamorphosés de Spalla by Max-André Rayjean
797. La Cité au bout de l'espace by Pierre Suragne
798. Commando HC - 9 by Karl-Herbert Scheer
799. Les Couloirs de translation by Peter Randa
800. L'Oeuf d'antimatière by Robert Clauzel
801. Les Robots de Xaar by Gabriel Jan
802. Les Légions de Bartzouk by Jimmy Guieu
803. La Tour des nuages by Maurice Limat
804. La Mort des dieux by Daniel Piret
805. Au-delà des trouées noires by Dan Dastier
806. Le Temps des autres by Chris Burger
807. Les Neuf dieux de l'espace by Frank Dartal
808. Les Esclaves de Thô by Jan de Fast
809. Cette machine est folle by F. Richard-Bessière
810. L'Arche des aïeux by Clark Darlton and Karl-Herbert Scheer
811. Dal'nim by Doris Le May and Jean-Louis Le May
812. La Courte éternité d'Hervé Girard by Georges Murcie
813. L'Île des Bahalim by Daniel Piret
814. Opération Epsilon by Jean-Pierre Garen
815. Le Piège de lumière by Max-André Rayjean
816. L'Élément 120 by Karl-Herbert Scheer
817. Un monde de chiens by Jean Mazarin
818. Les Ratés by Gilles Thomas
819. Le Cycle des Algoans by Peter Randa
820. Nuit d'émeute by Paul Béra
821. Mortels horizons by Maurice Limat
822. Alerte aux Antis by Clark Darlton and Karl-Herbert Scheer
823. Seules les étoiles meurent by Jan de Fast
824. Inu Shivan, dame de Shtar by Doris Le May and Jean-Louis Le May
825. Les Dévoreurs d'âmes by Daniel Piret
826. Les Maîtres de Gorka by Dan Dastier
827. Les Naufragés de l'invisible by Robert Clauzel
828. L'Affaire Pégasus by Karl-Herbert Scheer

==== 1978 ====
829. Les Sphères de l'oubli by Piet Legay
830. Concentration 44 by Gabriel Jan
831. Les Seigneurs de Kalaâr by Frank Dartal
832. Les Voies d'Almagiel by Gilles Thomas
833. Electronic man by André Caroff
834. Le Caboteur cosmique by Clark Darlton and Karl-Herbert Scheer
835. Commandos sur commande by Pierre Barbet
836. Hier est né demain by Jan de Fast
837. Principe Omicron by Maurice Limat
838. Marga by Georges Murcie
839. Les Vengeurs de Zylea by Dan Dastier
840. C.C. 5 top secret by Karl-Herbert Scheer
841. La Légende des niveaux fermés by Gilles Thomas
842. Jar-qui-tue by Paul Béra
843. L'Homme venu des étoiles by Peter Randa
844. Mémoire génétique by Jean-Pierre Garen
845. Quelques lingots d'iridium by Doris Le May and Jean-Louis Le May
846. La Flotte fantôme by Clark Darlton and Karl-Herbert Scheer
847. La Onzième dimension by Max-André Rayjean
848. L'Ancêtre d'Irskaa by Daniel Piret
849. La Forêt hurlante by Gabriel Jan
850. Rhésus Y-2 by André Caroff
851. Les Yeux de l'épouvante by Jimmy Guieu
852. L'Homme qui vécut deux fois by F. Richard-Bessière
853. Le Livre d'Éon by Frank Dartal
854. Le Prince de métal by Robert Clauzel
855. L'Homme qui partit pour les étoiles by Peter Randa
856. L'Ongle de l'inconnu by Paul Béra
857. Les Fontaines du ciel by Maurice Limat
858. Les Forçats de l'Antarctique by Karl-Herbert Scheer
859. Les Pétrifiés d'Altaïr by Piet Legay
860. Pas de berceau pour les Ushas by Jan de Fast
861. Interférence by Daniel Piret
862. La Mémoire du futur by Georges Murcie
863. La Louve de Thar-Gha by Dan Dastier
864. Les Cerveaux morts by Karl-Herbert Scheer
865. L'Univers fêlé by Jean Mazarin
866. Sanctuaire 1 by Peter Randa
867. La Chaîne des Symbios by Max-André Rayjean
868. Les Maîtres verts by Gabriel Jan
869. Le Plan de clivage by Jan de Fast
870. Combats sous les cratères by Karl-Herbert Scheer
871. Odyssée galactique by Pierre Barbet
872. Les Combattants de Serkos by André Caroff
873. L'Ange aux ailes de lumière by Gilles Thomas
874. Les Jeux de Nora et du hasard by Jan de Fast
875. Le Secret des secrets by Robert Clauzel
876. Opération soleil levant by Karl-Herbert Scheer
877. La Porte des enfers by Jacques Hoven
878. Le Navire-planète by Daniel Piret
879. Obsession Terzium 13 by Dan Dastier
880. Anastasis by Peter Randa
881. Véga IV by Piet Legay
882. Le Barrage bleu by Clark Darlton and Karl-Herbert Scheer
883. L'Hypothèse tétracérat by Doris Le May and Jean-Louis Le May
884. Les Séquestrés de Kappa by Dan Dastier
885. Reviens, Quémalta by Gabriel Jan
886. Là-bas by Georges Murcie
887. Génération Alpha by Max-André Rayjean
888. Pouvoirs illimités by Karl-Herbert Scheer
889. L'Épaisse fourrure des quadricornes by Doris Le May and Jean-Louis Le May
890. Les Pléïades d'Artani by Peter Randa
891. Le Soleil des Arians by Dan Dastier
892. La Cloche de brume by Maurice Limat
893. Le Piège de l'oubli by Jan de Fast
894. Les Passagers du temps by Piet Legay

==== 1979 ====
895. Hors contrôle by Paul-Jean Hérault
896. Les Maîtres de la matière by Max-André Rayjean
897. Les Roches aux cent visages by Frank Dartal
898. N'approchez pas by Karl-Herbert Scheer
899. Le Fils de l'étoile by Jan de Fast
900. Ceux d'ailleurs by Paul Béra
901. Aux confins de l'empire Viédi by Jan de Fast
902. Libérez l'homme ! by Jean Mazarin
903. Tout va très bien, Madame la machine by F. Richard-Bessière
904. Mission sur Mira by Jean-Pierre Garen
905. Facultés inconnues by Karl-Herbert Scheer
906. Impalpable Vénus by Gabriel Jan
907. L'Ordre établi by Christopher Stork
908. Comme un orgue d'enfer... by Robert Clauzel
909. Les Androïdes meurent aussi by Dan Dastier
910. L'Île brûlée by Gilles Thomas
911. L'Exilé de l'infini by Piet Legay
912. Le Désert des décharnés by Clark Darlton and Karl-Herbert Scheer
913. Dô, coeur de soleil by Maurice Limat
914. Palowstown by Jean-Christian Bergman
915. L'Ombre dans la vallée by Jean-Louis Le May
916. La Peste sauvage by Peter Randa
917. Triplix by Jacques Hoven
918. Le Règne du serpent by Frank Dartal
919. Le Talef d'Alkoria by Dan Dastier
920. L'Homme Alphoméga by Gabriel Jan
921. Projet phoenix by Piet Legay
922. Plus belle sera l'aurore by Jan de Fast
923. Les Bagnards d'Alboral by Peter Randa
924. Le Virus mystérieux by Karl-Herbert Scheer
925. Les Singes d'Ulgor by Max-André Rayjean
926. Enjeu : le Monde by Christopher Stork
927. La Cité où le soleil n'entrait jamais by Jan de Fast
928. D'un lieu lointain nommé Soltrois by Gilles Thomas
929. Marée noire sur Altéa by Paul Béra
930. Les Roues de feu by Karl-Herbert Scheer
931. Les Ilotes d'en-bas by Peter Randa
932. Trafic stellaire by Pierre Barbet
933. 37 minutes pour survivre by Paul-Jean Hérault
934. Le Viaduc perdu by Jean-Louis Le May
935. Facteur vie by Gilles Morris
936. Sous le signe de la Grande Ourse by Karl-Herbert Scheer
937. Branle-bas d'invasion by Peter Randa
938. Dormir ? Rêver peut-être by Christopher Stork
939. Aux quatre vents de l'univers by Frank Dartal
940. Les Cités d'Apocalypse by Jean Mazarin
941. Hiéroush, la planète promise by Jimmy Guieu
942. Le Mutant d'Hiroshima by Karl-Herbert Scheer
943. Naïa de Zomkaa by Dan Dastier
944. Un passe-temps by Kurt Steiner
945. Les Îles de la Lune by Michel Jeury
946. La Flamme des cités perdues by Robert Clauzel
947. N'Ooma by Daniel Piret
948. Offensive Minotaure by Karl-Herbert Scheer
949. La Jungle de pierre by Gilles Thomas
950. Les Sphères attaquent by André Caroff
951. Oasis de l'espace by Pierre Barbet
952. Homme, sweet homme by Jean-Christian Bergman
953. Les Lois de l'Orga by Adam Saint-Moore
954. Safari pour un virus by Jean-Louis Le May
955. Et les hommes voulurent mourir by Dan Dastier
956. Bactéries 3000 by André Caroff
957. Venu de l'infini by Peter Randa
958. Le Verbe et la pensée by Jean-Louis Le May
959. ...Ou que la vie renaisse by Gilles Morris
960. Achetez Dieu ! by Christopher Stork

=== 1980s ===
==== 1980 ====
961. Le Maître des cerveaux by Piet Legay
962. Rod, combattant du futur by André Caroff
963. Une autre éternité by Dan Dastier
964. Les Quatre vents de l'éternité by F. Richard-Bessière
965. Les Manipulateurs by Paul Béra
966. Opération Okal by Clark Darlton and Karl-Herbert Scheer
967. L'Ultimatum des treize jours by Jan de Fast
968. Robinson du Cosmos by Jacques Hoven
969. Tétras by Georges Murcie
970. Virgules téléguidées by Pierre Suragne
971. Moi, le feu by Maurice Limat
972. Planète des Anges by Gabriel Jan
973. Escale à Hango by Peter Randa
974. Rod, menace sur Oxima by André Caroff
975. Transfert Psi ! by Piet Legay
976. L'Alizé Pargélide by Jean-Louis Le May
977. La Terre est une légende by Frank Dartal
978. Greffe-moi l'amour ! by Jean Mazarin
979. Techniques de survie by Gilles Morris
980. Les Jours de la montagne bleue by Adam Saint-Moore
981. La Horde infâme by Paul Béra
982. La Clé du Mandala by Jimmy Guieu
983. Strontium 90 by Daniel Piret
984. Dingue de planète by Gabriel Jan
985. Les Sphères de Penta by Dan Dastier
986. Terra-Park by Christopher Stork
987. 3087 by Adam Saint-Moore
988. Untel, sa vie, son oeuvre by Gilles Morris
989. Heyoka Wakan by Jean-Louis Le May
990. Demandez le programme ! by Yann Menez
991. Horlemonde by Gilles Thomas
992. Les Écumeurs du silence by Michel Jeury
993. Apocalypse snow by Jean-Christian Bergman
994. Périple galactique by Pierre Barbet
995. Contre-offensive Copernicus by Karl-Herbert Scheer
996. Les Intemporels by Dan Dastier
997. La Compagnie des Glaces by G.-J. Arnaud
998. Chez Temporel by Louis Thirion
999. Dérapages by Pierre Suragne
1000. Le Zénith... et après ? by Maurice Limat
1001. L'Usage de l'ascenseur est interdit aux enfants de moins de quatorze ans non accompagnés by Christopher Stork
1002. Les Malvivants by Gilles Morris
1003. Le Sombre éclat by Michel Jeury
1004. Groupe Géo by Max-André Rayjean
1005. Chak de Palar by Paul-Jean Hérault
1006. Civilisations galactiques-Providence by Frank Dartal
1007. Vive les surhommes ! by Jean Mazarin
1008. L'Homme aux deux visages by Clark Darlton and Karl-Herbert Scheer
1009. Nous irons à Kalponéa by Paul Béra
1010. Ballade pour un glandu by Yann Menez
1011. Le Défi génétique by Piet Legay
1012. La Vie en doses by Gilles Morris
1013. La Porte des serpents by Gilles Thomas
1014. La Mémoire de l'archipel by Adam Saint-Moore
1015. Deux souris pour un Concorde by Jean-Louis Le May
1016. Centre d'Intendance Godapol by Karl-Herbert Scheer
1017. Stade zéro by Dan Dastier
1018. La Dernière bataille de l'espace by Jan de Fast
1019. Survivance by Budy Matieson
1020. Rêves en synthèse by Gabriel Jan
1021. Les Vivants, les morts et les autres by Gilles Morris
1022. Programmation impossible by Karl-Herbert Scheer
1023. Les Dieux oubliés by Clark Darlton and Karl-Herbert Scheer
1024. Il y a un temps fou... by Christopher Stork
1025. L'Ultime test by Piet Legay
1026. Rod, patrouille de l'espace by André Caroff
1027. Le Maréchal rebelle by Pierre Barbet
1028. Q.I. by Paul Béra
1029. Intendance martienne Alpha VI by Karl-Herbert Scheer
1030. Vecteur Dieu by Gilles Morris
1031. Le Proscrit de Delta by Maurice Limat
1032. Quand la machine fait "boum" by F. Richard-Bessière
1033. Soucoupes violentes by Gilles Morris
1034. Le Seigneur de l'histoire by Michel Jeury
1035. Rod, Vacuum 02 by André Caroff
1036. Mission secrète "œil géant" by Karl-Herbert Scheer
1037. L'Aventure akonide by Clark Darlton and Karl-Herbert Scheer

==== 1981 ====
1038. Le Sanctuaire des Glaces by G.-J. Arnaud
1039. L'Étrange maléfice by Piet Legay
1040. La Fresque by Paul-Jean Hérault
1041. Demain les rats by Christopher Stork
1042. Tamkan le paladin by Gabriel Jan
1043. Le Dieu endormi by Karl-Herbert Scheer
1044. Mannes éphémères by Clark Darlton and Karl-Herbert Scheer
1045. La Guerre des Lovies by Gilles Morris
1046. La Métamorphose des Shaftes by Dan Dastier
1047. La Légende future by Maurice Limat
1048. Obsession temporelle by Piet Legay
1049. La Vingt-sixième réincarnation by Adam Saint-Moore
1050. Le Test de l'aigle rouge by Karl-Herbert Scheer
1051. Le Secret des pierres radieuses by Jan de Fast
1052. Les Fusils d'Ekaistos by Philippe Randa
1053. Les Derniers anges by Christopher Stork
1054. Déchéa by Max-André Rayjean
1055. Les Plasmoïdes au pouvoir ? by Gilles Morris
1056. Le Peuple des Glaces by G.-J. Arnaud
1057. Étoile sur Mentha by Gabriel Jan
1058. Alerte à l'hypnose by Karl-Herbert Scheer
1059. Changez de bocal by Paul Béra
1060. Capitaine Pluton by Jean-Pierre Garen
1061. Le Mystère Varga by Piet Legay
1062. La Sainte Espagne programmée by Michel Jeury
1063. Une morsure de feu by Maurice Limat
1064. Complots arkonides by Clark Darlton and Karl-Herbert Scheer
1065. Coefficient de sécurité : trois by Karl-Herbert Scheer
1066. L'Expérience du grand cataclysme by Philippe Randa
1067. Les Volcans de Mars by Jean-Louis Le May
1068. Échec aux Ro'has by Piet Legay
1069. Un drahl va naître by Gabriel Jan
1070. Un monde impossible by Gilles Morris
1071. Cités des Astéroïdes by Pierre Barbet
1072. S.O.S. Sibérie by Karl-Herbert Scheer
1073. Les Dieux maudits d'Alphéa by Dan Dastier
1074. Vatican 2000 by Christopher Stork
1075. Le Réveil des dieux by Philippe Randa
1076. Notre chair disparue by Gilles Morris
1077. Les Chasseurs des Glaces by G.-J. Arnaud
1078. La Traque d'été by Adam Saint-Moore
1079. Jaïral by Max-André Rayjean
1080. Le Palais du roi Phédon by Philippe Randa
1081. La Révolte des grands cerveaux by Karl-Herbert Scheer
1082. Pas de passeport pour Anésia by Jan de Fast
1083. La Nuit solaire by Maurice Limat
1084. Les Non-humains by Jacques Hoven
1085. Opération Dernière Chance by Clark Darlton and Karl-Herbert Scheer
1086. La Révolte des boudragues by Jean-Louis Le May
1087. ...ou que la mort triomphe ! by Gilles Morris
1088. Angel félina by Joël Houssin
1089. Mais l'espace... mais le temps... by Daniel Walther
1090. Avant-poste by Jean Mazarin
1091. Les Hommes-processeurs by Michel Jeury
1092. Le Bon Larron by Christopher Stork
1093. Titcht by Christian Mantey
1094. Les Petites femmes vertes by Christopher Stork
1095. Planète-Suicide by Gilles Morris
1096. L'Enfant de Xéna by Dan Dastier
1097. Le Troubadour de minuit by Maurice Limat
1098. Le Monde noir by Max-André Rayjean
1099. Les Psychos de Logir by Pierre Barbet
1100. Rencontres extragalactiques by Clark Darlton and Karl-Herbert Scheer
1101. Mission sur terre by Philippe Randa
1102. Sheena by Gabriel Jan
1103. En une éternité ... by Jean Mazarin
1104. L'Enfant des glaces by G.-J. Arnaud
1105. Un autre monde by André Caroff
1106. Le Pronostiqueur by Joël Houssin
1107. Lacunes dans l'espace by Jean-Louis Le May
1108. La Femme invisible by Christopher Stork
1109. Une secte comme beaucoup d'autres by Gilles Morris
1110. Le Règne d'Astakla by Dan Dastier
1111. Il fera si bon mourir ... by Jan de Fast
1112. Au nom de l'espèce by Piet Legay
1113. Sloma de l'Abianta by Daniel Piret
1114. N'aboyez pas trop fort, Mr. Brenton by F. Richard-Bessière

==== 1982 ====
1115. L'Enjeu lunaire by Karl-Herbert Scheer
1116. Les Otages des Glaces by G.-J. Arnaud
1117. Captif du temps by André Caroff
1118. Les Renégats d'Ixa by Maurice Limat
1119. Les Envoyés de Mega by Daniel Piret
1120. Message de Bâl 188 by Frank Dartal
1121. Fallait-il tuer Dieu ? by Gilles Morris
1122. Le Gnome halluciné by G.-J. Arnaud
1123. Nadar by Gabriel Jan
1124. Baroud sur Bolkar by Philippe Randa
1125. Sept soleils dans la Licorne by Jean-Louis Le May
1126. Le Champion des mondes by Joël Houssin
1127. Le Cocon-Psi by Karl-Herbert Scheer
1128. La Mort de Mecanica by Clark Darlton and Karl-Herbert Scheer
1129. Examen de passage by Gilles Morris
1130. L'An II de la mafia by Christopher Stork
1131. Cités interstellaires by Pierre Barbet
1132. Le Livre de Swa by Daniel Walther
1133. La Planète du jugement by Michel Jeury
1134. Le Secret d'Irgoun by Dan Dastier
1135. Shea by Budy Matieson
1136. Les Survivants de l'Au-delà by F. Richard-Bessière
1137. Cosmodrame by Gilles Morris
1138. Hypothèse "gamma" by Piet Legay
1139. La Compagnie de la Banquise by G.-J. Arnaud
1140. Prométhée by Daniel Piret
1141. Tu vivras, Céréluna by Gabriel Jan
1142. Haute-Ville by Jean Mazarin
1143. Coup dur sur Deneb by Maurice Limat
1144. Blue by Joël Houssin
1145. L'Ère des Bionites by Dan Dastier
1146. La Planète Noire de Lothar by Philippe Randa
1147. Métal en fusion by André Caroff
1148. L'Oiseau de Mars by Karl-Herbert Scheer
1149. Le Captif du futur by Clark Darlton and Karl-Herbert Scheer
1150. Un monde si noir by Piet Legay
1151. La Vie, la mort confondues... by Gilles Morris
1152. Survivants de l'apocalypse by Pierre Barbet
1153. Le Voyage de Baktur by Gabriel Jan
1154. Tout le pouvoir aux étoiles by Christopher Stork
1155. Les Conjurés de Shargol by Philippe Randa
1156. La Bataille de Panotol by Clark Darlton and Karl-Herbert Scheer
1157. Le Réseau de Patagonie by G.-J. Arnaud
1158. Le Destin de Swa by Daniel Walther
1159. L'Hérésiarque by Adam Saint-Moore
1160. Masques de Clown by Joël Houssin
1161. Terreur psy by André Caroff
1162. Ald'haï by Jean-Louis Le May
1163. Les Glaces du temps by Frank Dartal
1164. Les Esclaves de Xicor by Maurice Limat
1165. Un pour tous... tous pourris ! by Gilles Morris
1166. L'Horrible découverte du Dr Coffin by Robert Clauzel
1167. Le Dernier des Zwors by Jean-Pierre Garen
1168. Elle s'appelait Loan by Piet Legay
1169. L'Empereur d'Éridan by Pierre Barbet
1170. Arbitrage martien by Karl-Herbert Scheer
1171. Nausicaa by Jean Mazarin
1172. La Machine maîtresse by Christopher Stork
1173. Folle meffa by Philippe Randa
1174. Une odeur de sainteté by Gilles Morris
1175. Le Piège des sables by André Caroff
1176. Livradoch le Fou by Jean-Louis Le May
1177. L'Ordre des vigiles by Max-André Rayjean
1178. Les Astres noirs by Clark Darlton and Karl-Herbert Scheer
1179. Une peau si... bleue ! by Piet Legay
1180. Les Voiliers du rail by G.-J. Arnaud
1181. Goer-le-renard by Michel Jeury
1182. Le Répertoire des époques de cette galaxie et de quelques autres by Louis Thirion
1183. Les Mangeurs de murailles by Serge Brussolo
1184. Le Mécaniquosmos by Maurice Limat
1185. Lilith by Joël Houssin
1186. Dis, qu'as-tu fait, toi que voilà ... by Christopher Stork
1187. Les Écologistes de combat by Philippe Randa
1188. ... Et le Paradis en plus ! by Gilles Morris
1189. Les Héritiers d'Antinéa by Dan Dastier
1190. A l'image du dragon by Serge Brussolo
1191. Les Cages de Beltem by Gilles Thomas
1192. La Bataille des dieux by J. Stuntman

==== 1983 ====
1193. L'Effet Halstead by Christian Mantey
1194. Planeta non grata by Michel Honaker
1195. Brigade de mort by Gabriel Jan
1196. Perpetuum... by Piet Legay
1197. Et un temps pour mourir by Frank Dartal
1198. Les Fous du soleil by G.-J. Arnaud
1199. Les Charognards de S'nien by Pierre Barbet
1200. Génération Clash by Gilles Morris
1201. La 666e planète by Daniel Piret
1202. La Légende de Swa by Daniel Walther
1203. L'Oiseau dans le ciment by André Caroff
1204. Expérimentation Alpha by Louis Thirion
1205. Les Jardins de Xantha by Gabriel Jan
1206. Les Tours divines by Michel Jeury
1207. Network-Cancer by G.-J. Arnaud
1208. La Frontière indécise by Gilles Morris
1209. L'Ombre du tueur by Paul Béra
1210. Les Presque dieux by Maurice Limat
1211. Génie génétique by Jean-Pierre Garen
1212. Anticorps 107 by Piet Legay
1213. Médiation protoplasmique by Clark Darlton and Karl-Herbert Scheer
1214. Avant les déluges by F. Richard-Bessière
1215. Le Chasseur by Joël Houssin
1216. La Grande prêtresse de Yashtar by Gabriel Jan
1217. La Quatrième personne du pluriel by Christopher Stork
1218. Les Prophètes de l'apocalypse by Jean Mazarin
1219. Wildlife connection by Christian Mantey
1220. Opération surprise by Clark Darlton and Karl-Herbert Scheer
1221. Trop pour un seul homme by Gilles Morris
1222. L'Article de la mort by Christopher Stork
1223. Ce cœur dans la glace... by Piet Legay
1224. Station-Fantôme by G.-J. Arnaud
1225. Le Puzzle de chair by Serge Brussolo
1226. Dérive sur Kimelunga by Jean-Louis Le May
1227. Embuscade sur Ornella by Daniel Walther
1228. Après les déluges by F. Richard-Bessière
1229. La Dernière syllabe du temps by Christopher Stork
1230. Intervention Flash by Gilles Morris
1231. Comme un vol de chimères by Maurice Limat
1232. Aléas à travers le temps by Philippe Randa
1233. Les Fils de Prométhée by Daniel Piret
1234. Prisonnier du plasma by Clark Darlton and Karl-Herbert Scheer
1235. City by Joël Houssin
1236. Les Cendres de la nuit by Robert Clauzel
1237. Élimination by André Caroff
1238. Mon pote, le Martien... by Philippe Randa
1239. Quand le temps soufflera by Michel Jeury
1240. Shan-Aya by Dan Dastier
1241. Dimension quatre ! (La loi du temps) by Piet Legay
1242. Un peu... beaucoup... à la folie by Christopher Stork
1243. Un peu de vin d'antan by Jean-Louis Le May
1244. Les Semeurs d'abîmes by Serge Brussolo
1245. Ordinator-Labyrinthus by André Caroff
1246. Évolution Crash by Gilles Morris
1247. Le Grand oiseau des galaxies by Maurice Limat
1248. Un bonheur qui dérape by Jean Mazarin
1249. Les Hommes-Jonas by G.-J. Arnaud
1250. Simulations by André Caroff
1251. Territoire de fièvre by Serge Brussolo
1252. Game Over by Joël Houssin
1253. Alpha-Park by Max-André Rayjean
1254. Rome doit être détruite by Pierre Barbet
1255. Le Monde-aux-Cent-Soleils by Clark Darlton and Karl-Herbert Scheer
1256. Le XXIe siècle n'aura pas lieu by Christopher Stork
1257. Les Lutteurs immobiles by Serge Brussolo
1258. Secteur Diable by Gilles Morris
1259. La Cité de l'éternelle nuit by Robert Clauzel
1260. Vers l'âge d'or by Michel Jeury
1261. À la découverte du Graal by F. Richard-Bessière
1262. Apollo XXV by Daniel Walther
1263. Mais n'anticipons pas... by Christopher Stork
1264. La Démone de Karastan by Philippe Randa
1265. Voyeur by Joël Houssin
1266. L'Œil éCarlate by Maurice Limat
1267. Terminus Amertume by G.-J. Arnaud
1268. Un jeu parmi tant d'autres by Gabriel Jan
1269. Kamikazement vôtres by Gilles Morris

==== 1984 ====
1270. L'Histoire détournée by Jean Mazarin
1271. Les Brûleurs de banquise by G.-J. Arnaud
1272. Reflets d'entre-temps by Jean-Louis Le May
1273. Les Fils du serpent by Jimmy Guieu
1274. Pièces détachées by Christopher Stork
1275. Les Bêtes enracinées by Serge Brussolo
1276. Le Planétoïde hanté by Clark Darlton and Karl-Herbert Scheer
1277. Génération Satan by Piet Legay
1278. La Parole by Daniel Piret
1279. Les Vikings de Sirius by Maurice Limat
1280. No man's land by Christian Mantey
1281. Cal de Ter by Paul-Jean Hérault
1282. Les Métamorphes by Gilles Morris
1283. Ticket aller-retour pour l'hyperspace by Louis Thirion
1284. Les Colons d'Eridan by Pierre Barbet
1285. On ne meurt pas sous le ciel rouge by Gabriel Jan
1286. Le Gouffre aux garous by G.-J. Arnaud
1287. Survivre ensemble by Gilles Morris
1288. L'Emprise du cristal by Jean-Pierre Garen
1289. Les Goulags mous by Jacques Mondoloni
1290. Ce qui mordait le ciel… by Serge Brussolo
1291. L'Homme de lumière by Maurice Limat
1292. Virus Amok by Christopher Stork
1293. Les Maîtres de l'horreur by F. Richard-Bessière
1294. Demain matin, au chant du tueur ! by Michel Pagel
1295. L'Autre race... by Piet Legay
1296. L'Âge de Lumière by Max-André Rayjean
1297. Le Combat des Cent-Soleils by Clark Darlton and Karl-Herbert Scheer
1298. Carthage sera détruite by Pierre Barbet
1299. Le passé dépassé by Christopher Stork
1300. Les Ombres de la Mégapole by Adam Saint-Moore
1301. Un avenir sur commande by Gilles Morris
1302. Les Survivants de la mer Morte by Robert Clauzel
1303. Le Dirigeable sacrilège by G.-J. Arnaud
1304. Soupçons sur Hydra by Jean-Pierre Andrevon
1305. La Taverne de l'espoir by Michel Pagel
1306. Psy-connection by Piet Legay
1307. Les Démoniaques de Kallioh by Hugues Douriaux
1308. Les Bannières de Persh by Jean-Pierre Fontana and Alain Paris
1309. Deux pas dans le soleil by André Caroff
1310. Patrouilles by Jean Mazarin
1311. L'Esprit de Vénus by Karl-Herbert Scheer
1312. Pieuvres by Christopher Stork
1313. Vieillesse délinquante by Gilles Morris
1314. L'Élixir pourpre by Maurice Limat
1315. Crache-Béton by Serge Brussolo
1316. L'Anaphase du Diable by Michel Jeury
1317. La Pugnace révolution de Phagor by Daniel Walther
1318. Le Calumet de l'oncle Chok by Jean-Louis Le May
1319. L'Envers vaut l'endroit by Christopher Stork
1320. Le Viêt-nam au futur simple by Michel Pagel
1321. Liensun by G.-J. Arnaud
1322. L'Autre côté du vide by Gilles Morris
1323. Dernier étage avant la frontière by Jean-Pierre Fontana and Alain Paris
1324. Nord by Thierry Lassalle
1325. Menaces sur les mutants by Clark Darlton and Karl-Herbert Scheer
1326. Illa et son étoile by Jean-Louis Le May
1327. Ordinator-Macchabées by André Caroff
1328. Le Celte Noir by Michaël Clifden
1329. Le Flambeau de l'Univers by Max-André Rayjean
1330. Les Fœtus d'acier by Serge Brussolo
1331. Le Dernier pilote by Paul-Jean Hérault
1332. Incarnation illégale by Karl-Herbert Scheer
1333. Les Éboueurs de la vie éternelle by G.-J. Arnaud
1334. La Guerre de la lumière by Gabriel Jan
1335. Les Décervelés by Piet Legay
1336. La Nuit des insectes by Th. Cryde
1337. Offensive minérale by Gilles Morris
1338. L'Ordre des ordres by Jean-Pierre Garen
1339. Lorsque R'Saanz parut by Louis Thirion
1340. Terre des femmes by Christopher Stork
1341. Sarkô des grandes zunes by Jean-Pierre Fontana and Alain Paris
1342. Ordinator-Phantastikos by André Caroff
1343. Carthage en Amérique by Jacques Mondoloni
1344. À moins d'un miracle... by Gilles Morris
1345. Les Idoles du lynx by Maurice Limat
1346. Les Pierres de la Mort by F. Richard-Bessière

==== 1985 ====
1347. Eldorado stellaire by Pierre Barbet
1348. Galactic paranoïa by Louis Thirion
1349. L'Hydre acéphale by Maurice Limat
1350. La Troisième puissance by Gabriel Jan
1351. Les Trains-cimetières by G.-J. Arnaud
1352. Galax-western by Hugues Douriaux
1353. Le Mirage de la montagne chantante by Clark Darlton and Karl-Herbert Scheer
1354. Camarade Yankee ! by Philippe Randa
1355. Paradis zéro by Pierre Pelot
1356. Osmose by Th. Cryde
1357. Ehecatl, seigneur le vent by Jean-Louis Le May
1358. L'Âge à rebours by Jean Mazarin
1359. Le Syndrome Karelmann by Jean-Pierre Fontana and Alain Paris
1360. Rhino by Dominique Douay
1361. Ordinator-Érotikos by André Caroff
1362. Le Premier hybride by Jean-Pierre Andrevon
1363. Les Psychomutants by Gilles Morris
1364. Les Fils de Lien Rag by G.-J. Arnaud
1365. Le Dernier paradis by Michel Jeury
1366. Ambulance cannibale non identifiée by Serge Brussolo
1367. Le Rêve du papillon chinois by Christopher Stork
1368. Les Clans de l'étang vert by Adam Saint-Moore
1369. Le Bruit des autres by Pierre Pelot
1370. Silence... on meurt ! by F. Richard-Bessière
1371. Cités biotiques by Pierre Barbet
1372. Les Contrebandiers du futur by Philippe Randa
1373. Viol génétique by Piet Legay
1374. Rouge est la chute du soleil by Maurice Limat
1375. Made in Mars by Christopher Stork
1376. Les Survivants du paradis by Michel Jeury
1377. Le Semeur d'ombres by Michel Honaker
1378. Ordinator-Criminalis by André Caroff
1379. Androïdes en série by Karl-Herbert Scheer
1380. Le Miroir du passé by Gilbert Picard
1381. La Pire espèce by Gilles Morris
1382. Le Rire du lance-flammes by Serge Brussolo
1383. Les Lunatiques by Christopher Stork
1384. Téléclones by Pierre Barbet
1385. Le Veilleur à la lisière du monde by Daniel Walther
1386. Poupée tueuse by Jean Mazarin
1387. La Cité du vent damné by Maurice Limat
1388. Voyageuse Yeuse by G.-J. Arnaud
1389. Billevesées et calembredaines by Christopher Stork
1390. À quoi bon ressusciter ? by Gilbert Picard
1391. Le Château des Vents infernaux by Hugues Douriaux
1392. Les Hommes-vecteurs by Michaël Clifden
1393. L'Inconnue de Ryg by Jean-Pierre Garen
1394. La Marée d'or by Michel Jeury
1395. La Valeur de la vie by Clark Darlton and Karl-Herbert Scheer
1396. Ordinator-Ocularis by André Caroff
1397. Ceux de la Montagne-de-Fer by Maurice Limat
1398. Le Temple du dieu Mazon by Jean-Pierre Fontana and Alain Paris
1399. Rempart des naufrageurs by Serge Brussolo
1400. Les Acteurs programmés by Max-André Rayjean
1401. Putsch galactique by Pierre Barbet
1402. Lumière d'abîme by Michel Honaker
1403. L'Ange du désert by Michel Pagel
1404. Ordinator-craignos by André Caroff
1405. L'Ampoule de cendres by G.-J. Arnaud
1406. Roulette russe by Daridjana
1407. Sur qui veillent les Achachilas by Jean-Louis Le May
1408. La Marque des Antarcidès by Alain Paris
1409. Pour une dent, toute la gueule by Gilles Morris
1410. Le Volcan des sirènes by Gilbert Picard
1411. Cadavres à tout faire by F. Richard-Bessière
1412. Babel bluff by Christopher Stork
1413. Les Visiteurs du passé by Karl-Herbert Scheer
1414. Abattoir-Opéra by Serge Brussolo
1415. La Semaine carnivore by Th. Cryde
1416. Feu sur tout ce qui bouge ! by Gilles Morris
1417. L'Enfant de l'espace by Christopher Stork
1418. Ordinator-Rapidos by André Caroff
1419. Le Clan du brouillard by Jean-Pierre Fontana and Alain Paris
1420. Solstice de fer by Francis Berthelot
1421. Wân, l'iconoclaste by Maurice Limat
1422. La Mémoire totale by Claude Ecken
1423. Retour en avant by Gilles Morris

==== 1986 ====
1424. Naufrage sur une chaise électrique by Serge Brussolo
1425. Quand souvenirs revenir, nous souffrir et mourir by Jean-Michel Dagory
1426. Les Passagers du mirage by Pierre Pelot
1427. La Piste du sud by Thierry Lassalle
1428. P.L.U.M. 66-50 by Hugues Douriaux
1429. Sahra by Jean-Louis Le May
1430. Le Fléau de la galaxie by Clark Darlton and Karl-Herbert Scheer
1431. Sun company by G.-J. Arnaud
1432. Demi-portion by Christopher Stork
1433. Rowena by Michel Pagel
1434. Soldat-chien by Alain Paris
1435. La Guerre des loisirs by Max-André Rayjean
1436. Le Diable soit avec nous ! by Philippe Randa
1437. Le Bricolo by Paul-Jean Hérault
1438. Équinoxe de cendre by Francis Berthelot
1439. La Fleur pourpre by Jean-Pierre Garen
1440. Glaciation nucléaire by Pierre Barbet
1441. Le Chant du Vorkul by Michel Honaker
1442. Que l'éternité soit avec vous ! by Louis Thirion
1443. L'Heure perdue by Guy Charmasson
1444. Nitrabyl la ténébreuse by Karl-Herbert Scheer
1445. Un pied sur Terre by Gilles Morris
1446. Enfer vertical en approche rapide by Serge Brussolo
1447. Poupée cassée by Jean Mazarin
1448. Ils étaient une fois... by Christopher Stork
1449. Les Sibériens by G.-J. Arnaud
1450. Le Feu du Vahad'Har by Gabriel Jan
1451. La Jaune by Jean-Pierre Fontana
1452. Les Horreurs de la paix by Gilles Morris
1453. Transfert by Gérard Delteil
1454. O Tuha'd et les chasseurs by Jean-Louis Le May
1455. Le Temps des rats by Louis Thirion
1456. Ashermayam by Alain Paris
1457. La Ville d'acier by Michel Pagel
1458. La Saga d'Arne Marsson by Pierre Bameul
1459. Psys contre psys by Christopher Stork
1460. Le Clochard ferroviaire by G.-J. Arnaud
1461. La Barrière du crâne by Gilles Morris
1462. Métamorphosa by Philippe Randa
1463. Fou dans la tête de Nazi Jones... by Pierre Pelot
1464. La Colère des ténèbres by Serge Brussolo
1465. Khéoba-la-maudite by Maurice Limat
1466. Les Vautours by Joël Houssin
1467. Citéléem by Max-André Rayjean
1468. Les Androïdes du désert by Hugues Douriaux
1469. Les Conquérants immobiles by Pierre Pelot
1470. Opération Bacchus by Jean-Pierre Garen
1471. Les Combattants des abysses by Gilbert Picard
1472. Eridan VII by Frank Dartal
1473. Le Miroir de Molkex by Clark Darlton and Karl-Herbert Scheer
1474. Le Sphinx des nuages by Maurice Limat
1475. Danger, parking miné ! by Serge Brussolo
1476. De purs esprits... by Christopher Stork
1477. Les Wagons-mémoires by G.-J. Arnaud
1478. Objectif : surhomme by Gilles Morris
1479. Tragédie musicale by Hugues Douriaux
1480. "Reich" by Alain Paris
1481. En direct d'ailleurs by Gilles Morris
1482. Mémoires d'un épouvantail blessé au combat by Pierre Pelot
1483. La Croisade des assassins by Pierre Barbet
1484. Les Hommes-lézards by Jean-Pierre Fontana and Alain Paris
1485. Don Quichotte II by Christopher Stork
1486. Le Rêve et l'assassin by Sylviane Corgiat and Bruno Lecigne
1487. Rébellion sur Euhja by Clark Darlton and Karl-Herbert Scheer
1488. La Piste des écorchés by Gilles Morris
1489. Le Choix des destins by Pierre Bameul
1490. Mausolée pour une locomotive by G.-J. Arnaud
1491. Catacombes by Serge Brussolo
1492. Le Gladiateur de Vénusia by Jean-Pierre Garen
1493. Le Fou by Michel Pagel
1494. Cacophonie du nouveau monde by Gabriel Jan
1495. Observation du virus en temps de paix by Pierre Pelot
1496. Le Rêve du Vorkul by Michel Honaker
1497. Et la pluie tomba sur Mars by Maurice Limat
1498. L'Agonie des hommes by Gilles Morris
1499. Le Raid infernal by Paul-Jean Hérault
1500. L'Endroit bleu by Th. Cryde
1501. Contretemps by Christopher Stork
1502. L'Ombre des Antarcidès by Alain Paris
1503. Dans le ventre d'une légende by G.-J. Arnaud
1504. La Métamorphose du Molkex by Clark Darlton and Karl-Herbert Scheer
1505. Temps changeants by Pierre Barbet
1506. Le Programme troisième guerre mondiale by Sylviane Corgiat and Bruno Lecigne
1507. Le Viol du dieu Ptah by Phil Laramie
1508. Ultime solution... by Piet Legay

==== 1987 ====
1509. Accident temporel by Louis Thirion
1510. Le Monde d'après by Hugues Douriaux
1511. Le Dragon de Wilk by Jean-Pierre Garen
1512. Par le sabre des Zinjas by Roger Facon
1513. Les Cavaliers dorés by Michel Pagel
1514. U.S. go home... go, go ! by Philippe Randa
1515. La Cité des Hommes-de-Fer by Jean-Pierre Fontana and Alain Paris
1516. Les Échafaudages d'épouvante by G.-J. Arnaud
1517. Docteur squelette by Serge Brussolo
1518. Défense spatiale by Pierre Barbet
1519. Les Naufragés du 14-18 by Clark Darlton and Karl-Herbert Scheer
1520. Mortel contact by Piet Legay
1521. L'Univers en pièce by Claude Ecken
1522. Le Lit à baldaquin by Christopher Stork
1523. Building by Michel Honaker
1524. Cocons by Philippe Guy
1525. La Folle ruée des Akantor by Phil Laramie
1526. Le Serpent de rubis by Maurice Limat
1527. L'Araignée by Sylviane Corgiat and Bruno Lecigne
1528. Appelez-moi Einstein ! by Gilles Morris
1529. Les Idées solubles by Jacques Mondoloni
1530. Les Êtres vagues by Gilles Morris
1531. Les Errants by Hugues Douriaux
1532. Les Guerrières de Lesban by Jean-Pierre Garen
1533. Baroud pour le genre humain by Philippe Randa
1534. EMO by Bruno Lecigne
1535. Le Réveil de la forteresse by Karl-Herbert Scheer
1536. Les Ambulances du rêve by Richard Canal
1537. Opération "serrures carnivores" by Serge Brussolo
1538. Le Labyrinthe d'Eysal by Clark Darlton and Karl-Herbert Scheer
1539. Les Portes de l'enfer by Piet Legay
1540. La Famille by Paul-Jean Hérault
1541. Les Montagnes affamées by G.-J. Arnaud
1542. Le Rideau de glace by Alain Billy
1543. Je souffre pour vous... by Christopher Stork
1544. L'Univers-ombre by Michel Jeury
1545. Lointaine étoile by Maurice Limat
1546. La Longue errance by Gilles Morris
1547. Captifs de Corvus by Pierre Barbet
1548. Les Guerriers by Hugues Douriaux
1549. Le Sceau des Antarcidès by Alain Paris
1550. Les Sirènes d'Almadia by Philippe Randa
1551. La Nuit du venin by Serge Brussolo
1552. La Prodigieuse agonie by G.-J. Arnaud
1553. Alabama. Un. Neuf. Neuf. Six. by Pierre Pelot
1554. La Légende étoilée by Richard Canal
1555. Le Souffle de cristal by Sylviane Corgiat and Bruno Lecigne
1556. Une si jolie petite planète by Christopher Stork
1557. Un temps pour la guerre by Frank Dartal
1558. Le Dernier témoin by Piet Legay
1559. Le Sixième symbiote by Dan Dastier
1560. Un reich de 1000 ans ! by Pierre Barbet
1561. Le Chariot de Thalia by Jean-Pierre Garen
1562. Sergent-pilote Gurvan by Paul-Jean Hérault
1563. Soleil pourpre, soleil noir by Michel Pagel
1564. Le Commencement de la fin by Gilles Morris
1565. Sécession bis by Pierre Pelot
1566. Les Squales de la cité engloutie by Phil Laramie
1567. L'Hérésie magicienne by Jean-Louis Le May
1568. La Croix de flamme by Maurice Limat
1569. Le Trillionnaire by Christopher Stork
1570. Destination Atlantide by Karl-Herbert Scheer
1571. On m'appelait Lien Rag by G.-J. Arnaud
1572. Les Animaux funèbres by Serge Brussolo
1573. Les Olympiades truquées by Joëlle Wintrebert
1574. Les Gladiateurs de Nephers by Hugues Douriaux
1575. La Haine du Vorkul by Michel Honaker
1576. Les Vitrines du ciel by Jacques Mondoloni
1577. Le Fond de l'abîme by Gilles Morris
1578. Le Piège de glace by Clark Darlton and Karl-Herbert Scheer
1579. Cette vérité qui tue by Piet Legay
1580. Offensive du virus sous le champ de bataille by Pierre Pelot
1581. Train spécial pénitentiaire 34 by G.-J. Arnaud
1582. Les Voix grises du monde gris by Richard Canal
1583. La Septième griffe de Togor by Gérard Delteil
1584. Gurvan : les premières victoires by Paul-Jean Hérault
1585. Le Serpent d'angoisse by Roland C. Wagner
1586. Objectif : Mars 2005 by Pierre Barbet
1587. Le Dernier soleil by Max-André Rayjean
1588. Les Enfants du soleil by Christopher Stork
1589. La Planète des femmes by Roger Facon
1590. Les Démons de la montagne by Jean-Pierre Garen
1591. Le Bout du tunnel by Gilles Morris
1592. Le Temple de chair by Jean-Claude Dunyach
1593. Vermine by Hugues Douriaux
1594. L'Ombre des gnomes by Serge Brussolo
1595. Terre ! Terre ! by Gilles Morris
1596. Les Hallucinés de la voie oblique by G.-J. Arnaud
1597. Hors-jeu by Gérard Delteil
1598. Les Élus de Tôh by Gabriel Jan
1599. Atoxa-des-abysses by Maurice Limat

==== 1988 ====
1600. Soldat-chien 2 by Alain Paris
1601. Périls sur Mû by Philippe Randa
1602. Traqueur by Samuel Dharma
1603. Les Sauveteurs Sigans by Clark Darlton and Karl-Herbert Scheer
1604. Alter ego by Christopher Stork
1605. Tigre by Daniel Walther
1606. Aqualud ! by Piet Legay
1607. La Chasse by Hugues Douriaux
1608. Le Maître de Juvénia by Jean-Pierre Garen
1609. Le Temple d'Os by Jean-Claude Dunyach
1610. Le Masque d'écailles by Sylviane Corgiat and Bruno Lecigne
1611. L'Incroyable odyssée by Guy Charmasson
1612. Officier - pilote Gurvan by Paul-Jean Hérault
1613. L'Orchidée rouge de madame Shan by Alain Billy
1614. Un ange s'est pendu by Roland C. Wagner
1615. Le Voleur d'icebergs by Serge Brussolo
1616. Le Clone triste by Milan
1617. La Course contre la montre by Clark Darlton and Karl-Herbert Scheer
1618. Le Rire du Klone by Milan
1619. Le Loup by Hugues Douriaux
1620. Option zéro by Pierre Barbet
1621. Divine entreprise by Roger Facon
1622. L'Épopée du Draco by Frank Dartal
1623. Aux yeux la lune by Michel Jeury
1624. Bébé-miroir by Joëlle Wintrebert
1625. Survival by Piet Legay
1626. Le Mal d'Ibrator by Philippe Randa
1627. Le Tombeau du roi squelette by Serge Brussolo
1628. Pour une poignée d'Helix Pomatias by Michel Pagel
1629. Svastika by Alain Paris
1630. La Vengeance de l'Androïde by Jean-Pierre Garen
1631. L'Effondrement d'un empire by Clark Darlton and Karl-Herbert Scheer
1632. Kriegspiel by Dominique Goult & Jean-Marc Ligny
1633. Le Grand hurlement by Phil Laramie
1634. La Vengeance by Guy Charmasson
1635. Seigneur des runes by Alain Paris
1636. Maaga-la-Scythe by Alain Billy
1637. Nécromancies by Samuel Dharma
1638. Projet Nouvelle-Vénus by Claude J. Legrand
1639. La Mission by Guy Charmasson
1640. Sur l'épaule du grand dragon by Alain Paris
1641. L'Offensive de crétinisation by Clark Darlton and Karl-Herbert Scheer
1642. Le Monde au-delà des brumes by Hugues Douriaux
1643. Les Serviteurs de la force by Roger Facon and J.-M. Parent
1644. Réalité 2 by Louis Thirion
1645. Les Hérétiques du Vril by Alain Paris
1646. Thorn le guerrier by Hugues Douriaux
1647. Ronge by Yves Frémion
1648. L'Enfer des homosimiens by Piet Legay
1649. La Mémoire des pierres by Roland C. Wagner
1650. Les Hommes marqués by Gilles Thomas
1651. La Sylve sanguinaire by Clark Darlton and Karl-Herbert Scheer
1652. La Quête du Graal by Jean-Pierre Garen
1653. Les Mortels et les dieux by Hugues Douriaux
1654. Prisons intérieures by Roland C. Wagner
1655. Le Bagne des ténèbres by Laurent Genefort
1656. Le Dieu de lumière by Jean-Pierre Andrevon
1657. Le Diable à quatre by Michel Pagel
1658. Le Dieu du delta by Bertrand Passegué
1659. Les Futurs mystères de Paris by Roland C. Wagner
1660. Le Crépuscule du compagnon by François Rahier
1661. Dreamworld by Dominique Goult and Jean-Marc Ligny
1662. Les Croisés de Mara by G.-J. Arnaud

==== 1989 ====
1663. Panique à la banque du sperme by Gérard Néry
1664. Le Dragon du roi squelette by Serge Brussolo
1665. Dernière chance : humanité by Piet Legay
1666. Le Chemin d'ombres by Samuel Dharma
1667. Onze bonzes de bronze by Max Anthony
1668. L'Autoroute sauvage by Gilles Thomas
1669. Piège sur Korz by Jean-Pierre Garen
1670. Les Semeurs de mirages by Jean-Marc Ligny
1671. Le Dieu de la guerre by Alain Paris
1672. Jhedin Ovoghemma by Yves Carl
1673. Les Guerrières de Arastawar by Louis Thirion
1674. Les Monarques de Bi by G.-J. Arnaud
1675. Pâques sanglantes aux caraïbes by Gérard Néry
1676. Syndrome apocalypse by Hugues Douriaux
1677. Argyll by Bertrand Passegué
1678. Le Paysage déchiré by Roland C. Wagner
1679. Genesis II by Piet Legay
1680. Le Temps cyclothymique by Jean-Pierre Andrevon
1681. L'Art du rêve by Jean-Marc Ligny
1682. Des enfants très doués by Jean-Pierre Garen
1683. De silence et de feu by Claude Ecken
1684. Le Souffle de lune by Alain Billy
1685. Fantasmes en stock by Max Anthony
1686. La Croix des décastés by Gilles Thomas
1687. Sylvana by Michel Pagel
1688. Mort à l'encre de chine by Gérard Néry
1689. Shândoah ! by Piet Legay
1690. Les Enfants du silence by Claude Ecken
1691. Le Septième cycle by Bertrand Passegué
1692. Brebis galeuses by Kurt Steiner
1693. Enfer et purgatoire by Michel Honaker
1694. À la recherche de Faërie by Jean-Marc Ligny
1695. Un navire ancré dans le ciel by Roland C. Wagner
1696. Dernière tempête by Philippe Guy
1697. Yriel by Robert Alexandre
1698. La Septième saison by Pierre Pelot
1699. Les Pierres de sang by Jean-Pierre Garen
1700. Égrégore by Piet Legay
1701. Cette chose qui vivait sur Véra by Louis Thirion
1702. La Mort marchait dans les rues by Roland C. Wagner
1703. Fleur by Patrick Lachèze
1704. Lazaret 3 by G.-J. Arnaud
1705. Dal Refa'I by Alain Paris
1706. Labyrinthe de la nuit by Jean-Marc Ligny
1707. La Forteresse éternelle by Bertrand Passegué
1708. Top niveau by J.-C. Lamart
1709. Tchernobagne by Gérard Delteil
1710. La Mort en billes by Gilles Thomas
1711. Joal ban Kluane by Alain Paris
1712. Le Roi de fer by Jean-Pierre Garen
1713. Terminus l'Enfer by Gérard Néry
1714. L'Androïde livide de l'astéroïde morbide by Max Anthony
1715. Le Rire du clone by Piet Legay
1716. Le Rescapé de la Terre by Paul-Jean Hérault
1717. Sassar by Alain Paris
1718. Le Lévrier de Varik by Hugues Douriaux
1719. Hypnos et Psyché by Jean-Marc Ligny
1720. Le Grand hiver by Bertrand Passegué
1721. La Planète Jaja by Daniel Walther
1722. Les Bâtisseurs du monde by Paul-Jean Hérault
1723. Bronx cérémonial by Michel Honaker
1724. Les Noyés du fleuve Amour by Gérard Néry
1725. Désirs cruels by Michel Pagel
1726. O Gamesh, prince des ténèbres by Piet Legay
1727. L'Autre Cécile by Claude Ecken
1728. Les Ratés by Gilles Thomas
1729. La Chute des dieux by Jean-Pierre Garen
1730. La Soie rouge de Xanta by Hugues Douriaux

=== 1990s ===
==== 1990 ====
1731. Traqueur d'illusions by Jean-Marc Ligny
1732. Le Présent du fou by Pierre Pelot
1733. Les Psychopompes de Klash by Red Deff
1734. Ysée-A by Louis Thirion
1735. The verb of life by Michel Honaker
1736. Scorpions by Gérard Néry
1737. Les Forains du bord du gouffre by Pierre Pelot
1738. La Loi majeure by Don Hérial
1739. Les Ailes tranchées by Félix Chapel
1740. Zoomby by Vincent Gallaix
1741. Visiteurs d'apocalypse by Jean-Pierre Andrevon
1742. La Dame d'Alkoviak by Hugues Douriaux
1743. Le Ciel sous la pierre by Pierre Pelot
1744. Vous avez dit "humain" ! by Piet Legay
1745. Dépression by François Sarkel
1746. Les Voies d'Almagiel by Gilles Thomas
1747. Safari mortel by Jean-Pierre Garen
1748. Return of Emeth by Michel Honaker
1749. Le Dirigeable certitude by Alain Paris
1750. Les Faucheurs de temps by Pierre Pelot
1751. Les Autos carnivores by Max Anthony
1752. Apollo XXV by Daniel Walther
1753. La Révolte des barons by Hugues Douriaux
1754. Les Fils du miroir fumant by Alain Paris
1755. Soleil de mort by Pierre Barbet
1756. Emergency ! by Piet Legay
1757. Le Temple de la mort turquoise by Félix Chapel
1758. Les Derniers anges by Christopher Stork
1759. King of ice by Michel Honaker
1760. Le Peuple pâle by Alain Paris
1761. Démons by Jean-Marc Ligny
1762. Hydres by Don Hérial
1763. Ylvain, rêve de vie by Ayerdhal
1764. La Légende des niveaux fermés by Gilles Thomas
1765. Chasse infernale by Jean-Pierre Garen
1766. Arasoth by Hugues Douriaux
1767. Sorciers by Jean-Marc Ligny
1768. Le Sang de Fulgavy by Félix Chapel
1769. Made, concerto pour salmen et bohême by Ayerdhal
1770. Le Rêveur des terres agglutinées by Roland C. Wagner
1771. Secret of Bashamay by Michel Honaker
1772. Ross et Berkel by Paul-Jean Hérault
1773. Comme une odeur de tombeau by Samuel Dharma
1774. Le Profanateur by Piet Legay
1775. La Naïa, hors limites by Ayerdhal
1776. Les Enfants de Pisauride by Jean-Pierre Andrevon
1777. Les Enfants de Vonia by Hugues Douriaux
1778. Pédric et Bo by Paul-Jean Hérault
1779. Rasalgethi by Jean-Marc Ligny
1780. L'Homme-requin by Jean-Christophe Chaumette
1781. Ely, l'esprit-miroir by Ayerdhal
1782. L'Ange aux ailes de lumière by Gilles Thomas
1783. Evil game by Michel Honaker
1784. Apex (M57) by Jean-Marc Ligny
1785. La Cité sous la terre by Jean-Christophe Chaumette
1786. Les Éphémères des sables by Félix Chapel
1787. L'Autoroute de l'aube by Roland C. Wagner
1788. Le Fils du grand Konnar by Pierre Pelot
1789. Le Gardien du cristal by Jean-Pierre Garen
1790. Les Ballades du temps futur by Hugues Douriaux
1791. Bérénice by Jean-Marc Ligny
1792. Aoni by Jean-Christophe Chaumette
1793. Le Cri du corps by Claude Ecken
1794. L'Antre du serpent by Michel Pagel

==== 1991 ====
1795. Troll by Michel Honaker
1796. Sur la piste des Rollmops by Pierre Pelot
1797. La Prophétie by Jean-Christophe Chaumette
1798. Panique chez les poissons solubles by Max Anthony
1799. Le Temps de l'effroi by Piet Legay
1800. Requiem pour une idole de cristal by Louis Thirion
1801. Le Refuge de l'agneau by Michel Pagel
1802. Rollmops dream by Pierre Pelot
1803. Promesse d'Ille by Ayerdhal
1804. Les Épées de cristal by Jean-Christophe Chaumette
1805. Le Monde d'en bas by Bertrand Passegué
1806. Viper by Red Deff
1807. Orbret by Hugues Douriaux
1808. Zelmiane by Hugues Douriaux
1809. Les Amants pourchassés by Hugues Douriaux
1810. Apocalypse junction by Michel Honaker
1811. Gilbert le barbant - le retour by Pierre Pelot
1812. Le Guerrier sans visage by Jean-Christophe Chaumette
1813. Honneur de chasse by Ayerdhal
1814. Le Temps des lumières by Piet Legay
1815. Les Maîtres des souterrains by Bertrand Passegué
1816. Les Pirates de Sylwa by Jean-Pierre Garen
1817. Le Voyageur solitaire by Jean-Marc Ligny
1818. La Guerre en ce jardin by Richard Canal
1819. Les Fêtes de Hrampa by Félix Chapel
1820. Chroniques du désespoir by Roland C. Wagner
1821. L'Île brûlée by Gilles Thomas
1822. Dark spirit by Michel Honaker
1823. Danger : mémoire by Paul-Jean Hérault
1824. L'Homme du sid by Alain Paris
1825. Ganja by Red Deff
1826. Le Temps des révélations by Piet Legay
1827. De bitume et de sang by Manuel Essard
1828. L'Ombre des Rhuls by Jean-Pierre Garen
1829. Un été à Zédong by Jean-Marc Ligny
1830. L'Écume du passé by Alain Paris
1831. Ultimes aventures en territoires fourbes by Pierre Pelot
1832. Le Choix du Ksin by Ayerdhal
1833. Le Cimetière des astronefs by Michel Pagel
1834. Celui-qui-n'est-pas-nommé by Alain Paris
1835. Le Fouilleur d'âmes by Michel Honaker
1836. Ce qu'il y avait derrière l'horizon by Jean-Pierre Andrevon
1837. Nivôse by Jean-Claude Dunyach
1838. Aigue-Marine by Jean-Claude Dunyach
1839. Astronef Mercure by Jean-Pierre Garen
1840. Les Mondes furieux by Albert Higon
1841. Chien bleu couronné by Raymond Milési
1842. Espion de l'étrange by Karel Dekk
1843. D'un lieu lointain nommé Soltrois by Gilles Thomas
1844. Roche-Lalheue by Hugues Douriaux
1845. Demain, une oasis by Ayerdhal
1846. Albatroys by Jean-Marc Ligny
1847. Cette crédille qui nous ronge by Roland C. Wagner
1848. Une si jolie prison by Manuel Essard
1849. Le Loupiot by Paul-Jean Hérault
1850. L'Ère du spatiopithèque by Pierre Barbet
1851. Orages en terre de France by Michel Pagel
1852. Albatroys - 2 by Jean-Marc Ligny
1853. L'Ouragan des enfants-dieux by François Rahier

==== 1992 ====
1854. La Planète des Lykans by Jean-Pierre Garen
1855. La Chimère infernale by Albert Higon
1856. La Colonne d'émeraude by Jean-Pierre Fontana
1857. La Jungle de pierre by Gilles Thomas
1858. Voleurs de silence by Jean-Claude Dunyach
1859. Malterre by Hugues Douriaux
1860. L'Énigme du squalus by Piet Legay
1861. Le Monde blanc by Laurent Genefort
1862. Le Camp des inadaptés by Jean-Pierre Garen
1863. L'Oreille absolue by Michel Honaker
1864. Psychosphère by Gilles Morris
1865. Le Gymnase de l'ogre by Marc Lemosquet
1866. La Cité des Mille Plaisirs by Hugues Douriaux
1867. Le Vaisseau-démon by Albert Higon
1868. Le Désert des cendres by Jean-Pierre Fontana and Alain Paris
1869. Le Monolithe noir by Bertrand Passegué
1870. La Déesse de Cimbariah by Hugues Douriaux
1871. Le Syndrome des baleines by Ayerdhal
1872. Elaï by Laurent Genefort
1873. Métacentre by Bertrand Passegué
1874. Le Monstre de Palathor by Hugues Douriaux
1875. Le Mystère Lyphine by Ayerdhal
1876. Révélations interdites by Piet Legay
1877. Horlemonde by Gilles Thomas
1878. Le Gouffre du volcan céleste by Hugues Douriaux
1879. Les Possédés du démon by Jean-Pierre Garen
1880. Labyrinth-jungle by Oscar Valetti
1881. Les Compagnons de la lune blême by Roger Facon
1882. Rinocérox by Serge Brussolo
1883. Recyclage by Jean-Pierre Garen
1884. Les Peaux-épaisses by Laurent Genefort
1885. Deltas by Alain Le Bussy
1886. Cybione by Ayerdhal
1887. La Porte des serpents by Gilles Thomas
1888. La Mandragore by Piet Legay
1889. Penta by Dominique Brotot
1890. Hors normes by Paul-Jean Hérault
1891. Saigneur de guerre by Manuel Essard
1892. Plug-in by Marc Lemosquet
1893. Les Gardiennes d'espérance by Pierre Debuys
1894. Capitaine suicide by Serge Brussolo
1895. Mission secrète by Jean-Pierre Garen
1896. L'Ombre et le fléau by Oscar Valetti
1897. Mascarad City by Lucas Gorka

==== 1993 ====
1898. Aqua by Jean-Marc Ligny
1899. Symphonie Pastorale by Hugues Douriaux
1900. Le Huitième cristal du Dr. Mygale by Max Anthony
1901. Awacs by Alain Paris
1902. Les Fruits sataniques by Alain Billy
1903. Magie sombre by Gilles Thomas
1904. La Falaise by Th. Cryde
1905. Le Temps et l'espace by Jean-Pierre Garen
1906. Abîmes by Serge Brussolo
1907. Les Guerriers de glace by Hugues Douriaux
1908. Tremblemer by Alain Le Bussy
1909. REZO by Laurent Genefort
1910. Boulevard des miroirs fantômes by Max Anthony
1911. Le Visage derrière la nuit by Maurice Périsset
1912. Roll over, Amundsen ! by Jean-Claude Dunyach
1913. Chair inconnue by Oscar Valetti
1914. Rawâhlpurgis by Piet Legay
1915. Achéron by Alain Paris
1916. Les Moines noirs by Jean-Pierre Garen
1917. La Forteresse pourpre by Manuel Essard
1918. Crache-Béton by Serge Brussolo
1919. Déraag by Alain Le Bussy
1920. XYZ by Daniel Ichbiah and Yves Uzureau
1921. Les Ratés by Gilles Thomas
1922. Arago by Laurent Genefort
1923. Les Sortilèges de Maïn by Hugues Douriaux
1924. Les Mangeurs de viande by Jean-Pierre Garen
1925. L'Autoroute sauvage by Gilles Thomas
1926. De l'autre côté du mur des ténèbres by Serge Brussolo
1927. Le Sang des mondes by Jean-Pierre Vernay
1928. Cobaye by Marc Lemosquet
1929. Les Yeux de la terre folle by Philippe Pastor
1930. Neurovision by Dominique Brotot
1931. Envercoeur by Alain Le Bussy
1932. Haute-Enclave by Laurent Genefort
1933. Cyberkiller by Jean-Marc Ligny
1934. La Flûte de verre froid by Gilles Thomas

==== 1994 ====
1935. Polytan by Ayerdhal
1936. Les Mines de Sarkal by Jean-Pierre Garen
1937. Warrior by Hugues Douriaux
1938. Les Sentinelles d'Almoha by Serge Brussolo
1939. Garmalia by Alain Le Bussy
1940. Les Voleurs d'organes by Dominique Brotot
1941. Les Portes sans retour by Gilles Thomas
1942. Pour des soleils froids by Jean-Louis Trudel
1943. Le Peintre des orages by Alain Billy
1944. Les Chasseurs de sève by Laurent Genefort
1945. La Porte de flamme by Hugues Douriaux
1946. Nickel le Petit by Christophe Kauffman
1947. Les Adorateurs de Kaal by Jean-Pierre Garen
1948. Quête impériale by Alain Le Bussy
1949. Jalin Ka by Christophe Kauffman
1950. Shaan ! by Piet Legay
1951. L'Araignée de verre by Jean-Pierre Garen
1952. Parasol 27 by Alain Billy
1953. La Route des soleils by Wildy Petoud
1954. La Troisième lune by Laurent Genefort
1955. Le Ressuscité de l'Atlantide by Jean-Louis Trudel

==== 1995 ====
1956. Yorg de l'île by Alain Le Bussy
1957. Le Dernier des Aramandars by Hugues Douriaux
1958. Rork des plaines by Alain Le Bussy
1959. Une planète pour Copponi by Hugo Van Gaert
1960. Hou des machines by Alain Le Bussy
1961. Le Labyrinthe de chair by Laurent Genefort
1962. Profession : cadavre by Serge Brussolo
1963. La Guerre des cercles by Jean-Claude Dunyach
1964. Theophano 960 by Pierre Stolze
1965. Soleil fou by Alain Le Bussy
1966. De chair et de fer by Laurent Genefort
1967. Le Prisonnier de l'entre-deux-mondes by Hugues Douriaux
1968. Acherra by Gilles Thomas
1969. Offren by Gilles Thomas
1970. Promenade du bistouri by Serge Brussolo
1971. Les Hommes du maître by Jean-Pierre Garen
1972. Chatinika by Alain Le Bussy
1973. Le Chineur de l'espace by Paul-Jean Hérault

==== 1996 ====
1974. L'Homme qui n'existait plus by Laurent Genefort
1975. Interférences by Hugues Douriaux
1976. Justice galactique by Jean-Pierre Garen
1977. Phalènes by Philippe Guy
1978. Les Chemins de Pilduin by Claude Castan
1979. Jana des couloirs by Alain Le Bussy
1980. Lyane by Laurent Genefort
1981. Jorvan de la mer by Alain Le Bussy
1982. Djamol de Kîv by Alain Le Bussy
1983. La Route de Stelian by Claude Castan
1984. Les Allées de la gloire by Claude Castan
1985. La Montagne rouge by Jean-Pierre Garen
1986. Ceux qui ne voulaient pas mourir by Paul-Jean Hérault
1987. Les Pistes d'Ahran by Claude Castan
1988. La Balle du néant by Roland C. Wagner
1989. Les Pierres de lumière by Hugues Douriaux
1990. Alice qui dormait by Franck Morrisset
1991. La Mâchoire du dragon by G. Elton Ranne
1992. Le Dieu avide by Alain Le Bussy
1993. La Compagnie des fous by Laurent Genefort
1994. Les Voies du ciel by Laurent Genefort
1995. Les Rails d'incertitude by G.-J. Arnaud
1996. L'Ange et la mort by Franck Morrisset
1997. Autant en emporte le divan by Patrice Duvic
1998. Les Ravisseurs quantiques by Roland C. Wagner
1999. Les Oiseaux de cuir by Gilles Thomas

==== 1997 ====
2000. Wonderland by Serge Lehman
2001. L'Odyssée de l'espèce by Roland C. Wagner
