= Richard Bessière =

French author

Henri Richard Bessière (1923 – 22 December 2011) was a French author of science fiction and espionage novels. His œuvre, particularly abundant, was published primarily by publisher Fleuve Noir. Bessière was one of the leading authors of publisher Fleuve Noir's popular imprints Anticipation and Espionnage.

Bessière was born and died at Béziers - a year after his death, his home town announced that a street would be named in his honour. His first science fiction series (1951–54) featured the Conquérants de l’Univers [Conquerors Of The Universe], a band of Earthmen led by professor Bénac, the inventor of a spaceship called Meteor, who explore the Solar System. Bessière's most popular series featured the adventures of American journalist Sydney Gordon, his ditzy wife Margaret, his catastrophe-prone son, Bud, and his scientist friends, Archie and Gloria Brent. The series began with serious tales of alien or extra-dimensional invasions, but eventually took a satirical turn. Bessière's other popular series involved the hard-boiled adventures of Dan Seymour, a futuristic James Bond.

Bessière also made his mark on French science fiction through a number of non-connected novels that featured an original blend of horror and science fiction. Monstrous aliens threatening to take over mankind were featured in Escale chez les Vivants [Stop-Over Among The Living] (1960); evil entities from beyond human ken whose only weakness was sound invaded Earth in Les Maîtres du Silence [The Masters Of Silence] (1965); Cette Lueur Qui Venait Des Ténèbres [That Light Which Came From The Dark] (1967) featured ghastly body-snatching parasites. The ultimately doomed reconquest of a post-cataclysmic Earth ruled by mutants and deadly lifeforms, was the subject of Légion Alpha (1961), Les Sept Anneaux de Rhéa [The Seven Rings Of Rhea] (1962), in which Earth was described as seven concentric spheres with Hell at its core, and Les Jardins de l’Apocalypse [The Gardens Of The Apocalypse] (1963). Les Marteaux de Vulcain [The Hammers Of Vulcan] (1969) described a nightmarish planet where survival was all but impossible.

Bessière also wrote almost a hundred spy thrillers for the Espionnage imprint of Fleuve Noir under the pseudonym of F.-H. Ribes. Many of these starred a hero called Gérard Lecomte.

== Translations ==
Les Sept Anneaux de Rhéa and Les Jardins de l’Apocalypse have been translated by Brian Stableford and published as The Gardens of the Apocalypse (2010) ISBN 978-1-935558-68-2

== Notes ==
Source: Some of the information contained in this article was taken from:

- French Science Fiction, Fantasy, Horror and Pulp Fiction by Jean-Marc Lofficier & Randy Lofficier ISBN 0-7864-0596-1.
