= André Caroff =

French writer

- Born: André Carpouzis; 1924; Paris
- Died: 9 March 2009 (aged 84–85)
- Occupation: Author

André Caroff (pseudonym of André Carpouzis) (1924 in Paris – 9 March 2009) was a French author of science fiction and horror. His œuvre, particularly abundant, was published primarily by publisher Fleuve Noir.

Caroff was one of the leading authors of publisher Fleuve Noir's popular horror, then science fiction imprints, Angoisse and Anticipation. For Angoisse, he created the character of Madame Atomos, a brilliant but twisted middle-aged female Japanese scientist who is out to revenge herself against the United States for the bombings of Hiroshima and Nagasaki, where she was born. Eighteen novels were published between 1964 and 1970, and were recently collected in a six-volume omnibus edition by Rivière Blanche.

For Anticipation, Caroff had created various series including that of Space Security Agent Tom Rod. While his sight was impaired, Caroff had embarked on a new post-apocalyptic saga for Rivière Blanche in 2006, with two volumes already released and two more to be published posthumously. In total, Caroff's oeuvre included thirty horror novels and thirty-four science fiction novels.
