= René Brantonne =

Signature

René Brantonne, known as Brantonne, born on January 3, 1903 in Paris and died on October 6, 1979 (aged 76) in Créteil, was a French illustrator, graphic designer and comics artist.

He is best known for his numerous illustrations for book covers of science fiction novels published by Fleuve Noir, notably in the Fleuve Noir Anticipation collection.

== Biography ==
=== Youth and education ===
René Brantonne was born on January 3, 1903 in Paris.

In 1921, at the age of 18, René Brantonne was admitted to the École des Beaux-Arts in Paris. After completing his military service, he joined a photogravure workshop. During the late 1920s, he worked on commission for French and foreign companies, producing logos, posters, labels — notably for Camembert boxes — and illustrations for catalogues. He also briefly pursued fine art, exhibiting at the Salon des Indépendants from 1927 to 1929.

=== Success in the United States (1929–1945) ===
Around the age of 25, in 1928 or 1929, Brantonne moved to the United States. His talents as a graphic designer and poster artist earned him major commissions. For Standard Oil, he designed the logo for the Esso brand, consisting of red lettering surrounded by a blue oval, which has remained unchanged since. He also created film posters for French films distributed by Paramount Pictures, MGM, Universal and Columbia.

Remaining in the United States during the Occupation, he created comic strips for the French weekly magazine Les Grandes Aventures, featuring characters such as Buffalo Bill and Robinson Crusoe.

=== Comics in France (1945–1955) ===
After the Second World War, Brantonne returned to France and continued producing comics: Fulguros and Johnny Speed for Artima, Praline and Buffalo Bill for Éditions des Remparts, and Le Petit Shérif for Les Éditions Mondiales, founded by Cino Del Duca, which published magazines such as L'Audacieux and Tarzan, with which he collaborated.

He also worked for the magazines Aventures and Pic et Nic. Some of his works dealt with the French Resistance. He additionally created film adaptations in comic-book form.

=== Science fiction illustrations (1954–1977) ===
From the 1950s onward, Brantonne produced numerous illustrations, notably for cinema and for the covers of crime fiction novels published by popular literature publishers. Through this work, he met Frédéric Dard, whose character Bérurier may have been partly inspired by Brantonne’s coarse language.

As commissions multiplied, he was sometimes assisted by his son, who used the pseudonym Jack De Brown. Brantonne became the principal illustrator for Fleuve Noir’s science fiction collection Fleuve Noir Anticipation. He illustrated more than 500 covers, from issue No. 1 to No. 273 between 1951 and 1965, and later from No. 562 to No. 792 between 1973 and 1977. Due to lack of time, he stated that he did not read the novels he illustrated.

=== Death ===
René Brantonne died on October 6, 1979 (aged 76) in Créteil at the age of 76.
