= Maurice Limat =

French writer (1914–2002)

Maurice Limat (September 23, 1914 - January 23, 2002) was a French author of science fiction, fantasy, and adventure novels. A prolific writer, he published over 500 novels between the 1930s and the 1980s. He was best known for his science fiction novels, which often had philosophical and religious themes. He was published primarily by Fleuve Noir, and was part of their Anticipation imprint. He also published under pseudonyms, notably Maurice Lionel, Maurice d'Escrignelles, and Lionel Rex.

== Writing career ==
Limat's early science fiction novels include Les Fiancés de la Planète Mars (The Fiancés of Planet Mars, 1936) and Les Naufragés de la Voie Lactée (The Castaways of the Milky Way, 1939).

During this period, Limat also authored many adventure novels with fantasy elements such as La Montagne aux Vampires (The Mountain of Vampires, 1936), about a man who could control vampires, L'Araignée d'Argent (The Silver Spider, 1936), featuring a robotic spider created by an ancient civilization, Le Septième Cerveau (The Seventh Brain, 1939), Le Zodiaque de l'Himalaya (The Zodiac Of The Himalaya, 1942) and La Comète Écarlate (The Scarlet Comet, 1948).

During the 1950s, Limat wrote more science fiction novels, such as Les Faiseurs de Planètes (The Planet Makers, 1951), Comète 73 (Comet 73, 1953), Courrier Interplanétaire (Interplanetary Courier, 1953) and Le Mal des Étoiles (Star Sickness, 1954), some under his own name and some under pseudonyms.

During 1955, he contributed SOS Galaxie (SOS Galaxy) to the imprint Série 2000 and then wrote Monsieur Cosmos (1956) which dealt with the theme of the macrocosmic man, creator of universes. His novels began to display the influence of American "space operas".

By the time he began writing for the Anticipation imprint of Editions Fleuve Noir, in 1959, Limat was already a veteran writer. Les Enfants du Chaos (The Children Of Chaos, 1959), in which people use psychic powers to create a world, but then ask themselves whether they have earned the right to play God, is somewhat characteristic of his subsequent production.

Limat continued to be a prolific writer, authoring numerous lyrical, sometimes even religious, space operas for Fleuve Noir — 107 in total. The last of these was Atoxa-des-Abysses (Atoxa-Of-The-Abyss) in 1987. He also produced horror novels for Fleuve Noir's Angoisse imprint, featuring his detective character, Teddy Verano.

== Characters and legacy ==
Limat's long-running characters included Teddy Verano, Robin Muscat, and Chevalier Coqdor.

Teddy Verano, a detective of the supernatural, was the main character in Limon's horror novels for Angoisse.

Limon introduced the character of futuristic police commissioner Robin Muscat in Les Foudroyants (The Lightning Men, No. 164; 1960), in which a hapless young man is turned into an electromagnetic force.

Limon's most popular, long-running hero was the green-eyed, telepathic Chevalier Coqdor, introduced in L'Étoile de Satan (The Star Of Satan, No. 241; 1964).

Muscat and Coqdor often teamed with each other and were featured, separately or together, in a great number of subsequent novels. The Chevalier Coqdor adventures usually celebrated the power of love and tolerance, and a genuine belief in God, the Great Architect of the Universe, something unusual in science fiction.

After Limon's death, new stories featuring Chevalier Coqdor have been written by Jean-Michel Archaimbault and Jean-Marc Lofficier.
