= Jean-Pierre Garen =

Jean-Pierre Garen (born Jean-Pierre Goiran, 10 November 1932, Paris, – 4 March 2004, Paris) was a French physician and author of soft science fiction novels about Mark Stone, agent of the Surveillance Service Of Primitive Planets.
