= Alain Le Bussy =

Belgian science fiction author

Alain Le Bussy (1947 – 14 October 2010) was a prolific Belgian author of science fiction who won the Prix Rosny-Aîné in 1993 for his novel Deltas. He died on 14 October 2010 from complications following throat surgery.

His writing career started in 1961 publishing an article on gender in the journal 'Conjunct', it was not until 1968 when he wrote first novel. He wrote more than thirty novels with several of these in the series "Aqualia" and "Yorg." He was also an active member of science fiction fandom, the creator of the fanzine Xuensè (an anagram of Esneux, the first magazine he worked for) and an organizer of science fiction conventions. In 1995, he was inducted into the European Science Fiction Society Hall of Fame.

== Bibliography ==
- Djamol de Kiv, 2011 (Published posthumously)
- La Marque, 2010
- Piège Vital, 2009
- Aqualia, Tome 4: Chercheau, 2008
- Jouvence, 2007
- Les Filles, 2006
- Aqualia, Tome 2: Cercacier, 2006
- Aqualia, Tome 3: Colocta, 2006
- Aqualia, Tome 1: Dilterre, 2005
- Ruptures, 2005
- Yorg of the Island, 2004
- Les Otages de la Dent Blanche, 2003
- The Hostages of the Dent Blanche, 2003
- La Porte de Lumière, 2003
- The Gate of Light, 2003
- Soleil Mortel, 1999

Published with Black River between 1992 and 1999

- Deltas (Prix Rosny aîné 1993) Deltas (Price Rosny Elder 1993)
- Tremblemer Tremblemer
- Déraag Déraag
- Envercœur Envercœur
- Garmalia Garmalia
- Quête impériale Imperial Quest
- Yorg de l'île Yorg Island
- Rork des plaines Rork Plains
- Hou des machines Hou machines
- Soleil fou Crazy sun
- Chatinika Chatinika
- Le dieu avide The greedy god
- Jana des couloirs Jana corridors
- Jorvan de la mer Jorvan Sea
- Djamol de Kîv Djamol of Kiv
- Équilibre Balance
- La route du sud The southern route
- Nexus de feu Nexus Fire
- Le Maître d'Iquand The Master of Iquand
- Le Mendiant de Karnathok The Beggar Karnathok

== Awards ==
Preceded by Boris Shtern	ESFS award for Best Author; 1995	Succeeded by Andrzej Sapkowski
