= Jean-Marc Ligny =

French science fiction writer (born 1956)

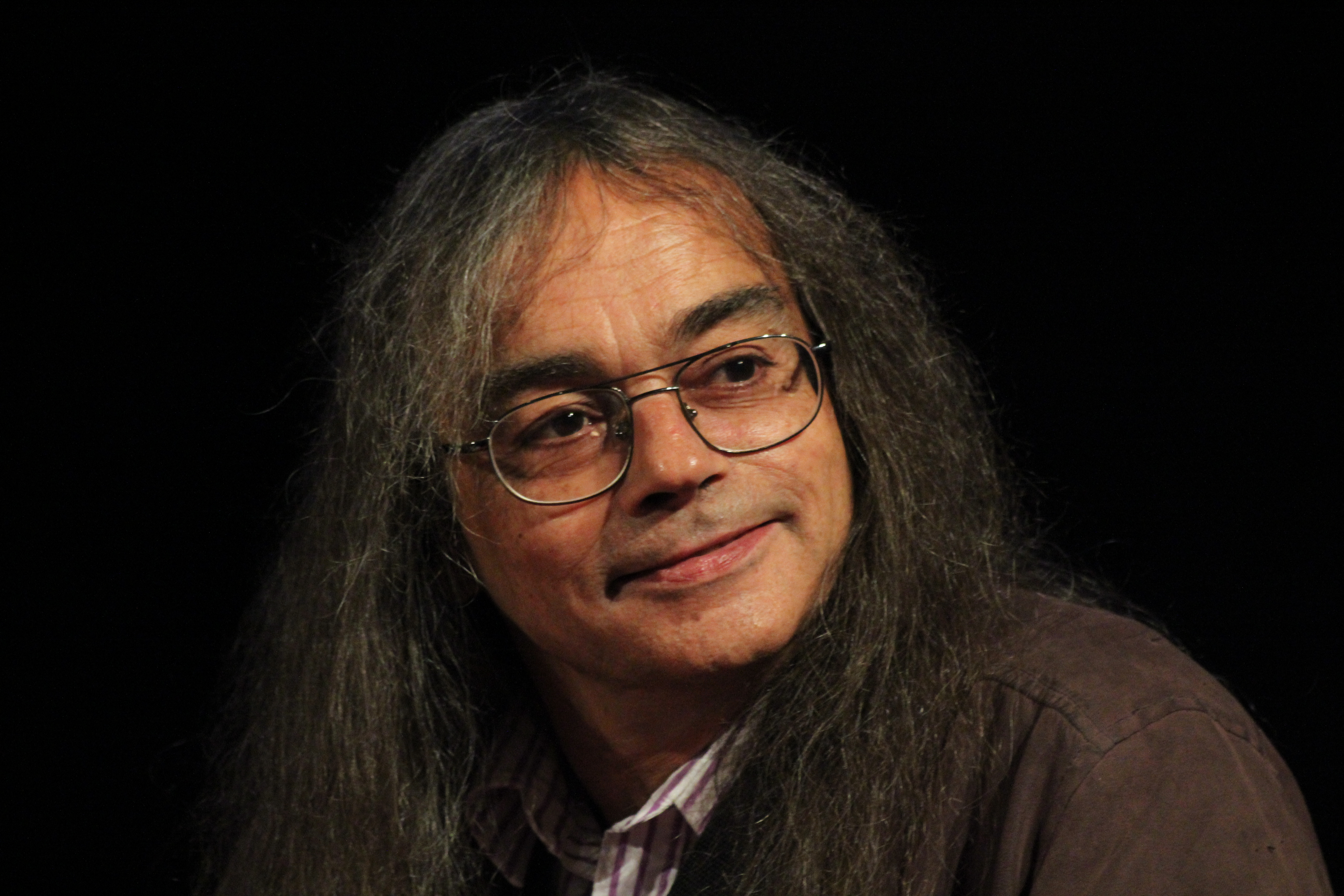
Jean-Marc Ligny at Utopiales 2014 in France

Jean-Marc Ligny (born 13 May 1956) is a French science fiction writer. He began in 1978 and went on to win both the Prix Rosny-Aîné (in 2008, for his novel Aqua TM) and the Prix Tour Eiffel de Science-Fiction. He has done notable works of cyberpunk and space opera. He is also known for the Les voleurs de rêves series and the award-winning Jihad. In addition to that he wrote an homage to the group Dead Can Dance.
