= Richard Canal =

French author and screenwriter

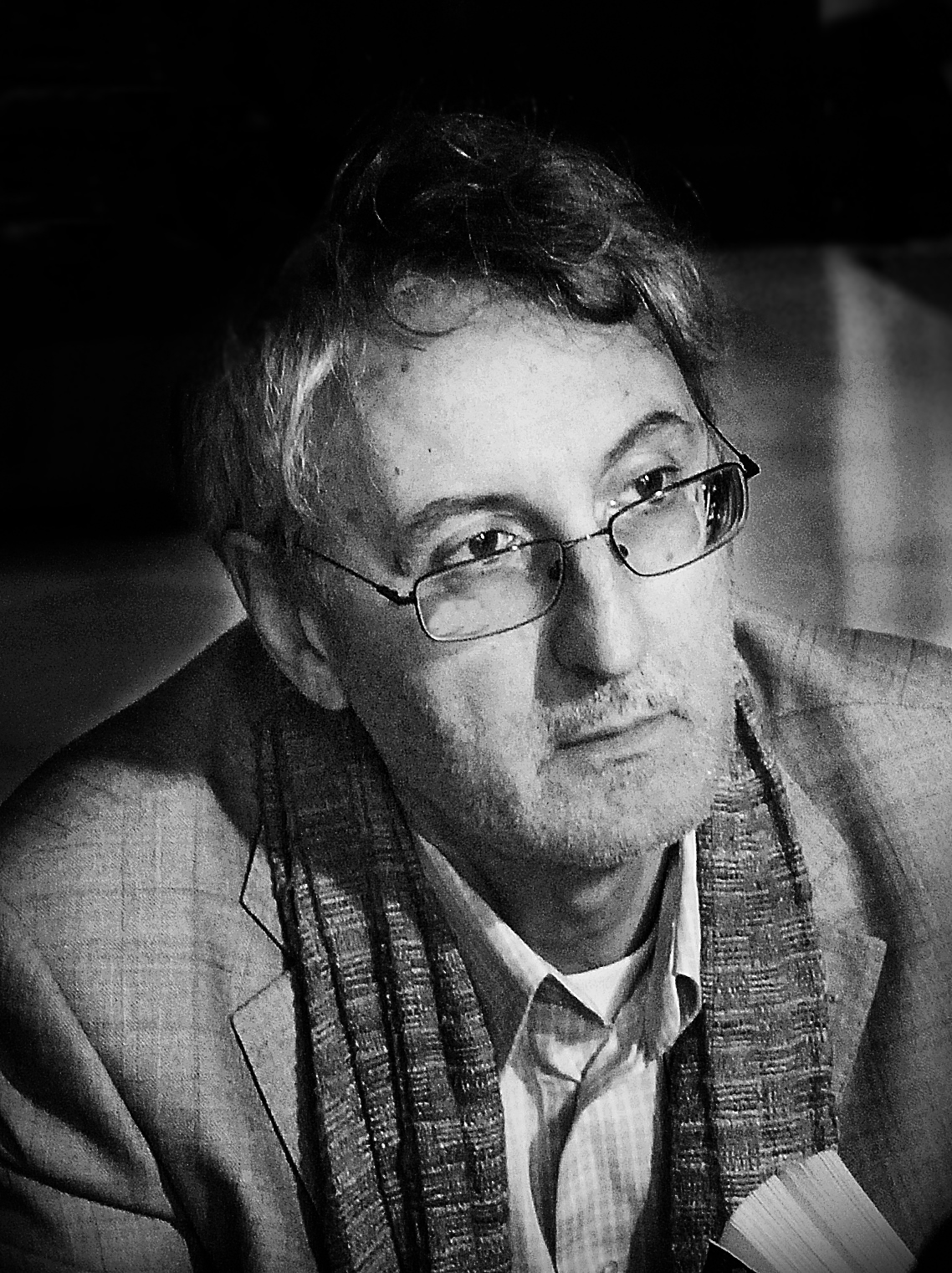
Richard Canal

Richard Canal (born 1953) is a French author and screenwriter in the science-fiction, fantasy, mainstream and thriller genres. He also worked as a computer science researcher and teacher in Africa and Asia. His science fiction works have won the Grand Prix de l'Imaginaire and the Rosny-Aîné Award.

== Biography ==
After a PhD in Toulouse III University, he became a teacher-researcher in computer science. He has lived in Africa for many years where he teaches artificial intelligence, multi-agent systems and genetic algorithms. There, he manages computer & mathematics departments in universities, writes and leads major projects in higher education for French Ministry of Foreign Affairs, especially in Senegal and Cameroon. When he moved to Asia, he is recruited by the Francophone University Agency (AUF) as leader of its outpost in Laos, then as headmaster of graduate institutes in Vietnam (IFI) and Tunisia (IFIC).

Canal is an ardent defender of a literary science fiction with style. His first short novel appears in the magazine Fiction in April 1983. Another short novel, C.H.O.I.C.E., is crowned in 1986 with a prize annually awarded by the Quebec magazine Solaris just before Étoile receives the Grand Prix de l'Imaginaire in 1989. La malédiction de l’éphémère (1986) is his first novel. He wins the Rosny-Aîné Award two years in a row for Ombre blanche in 1994 and Aube noire in 1995, two novels in his African Trilogy.

As for thrillers, La Route de Mandalay is published in 1998. His second novel in this field, Cyberdanse macabre (1999), features an astrophysicist, Mark Sidzik, who investigates the wrongdoings of a multinational microprocessor chip manufacturer with the help of Internet hackers. Gandhara (2018) moves from a hard boiled detective style (Hammet or Chandler like) to a postmodern thriller. It tells the epic journey of a private detective from Nice to London, from Bangkok to Kabul, in a world shaken by terrorist attacks.

In Upside Down (2020), his last novel, Richard Canal returns to universal science fiction, a main revealing of the major concerns of our time.

== Writings ==
=== Novel ===
Science-fiction

- La Malédiction de l’Éphémère, La Découverte, 1986
- Les Ambulances du Rêve, Fleuve Noir, 1986
- La Légende Étoilée, Fleuve Noir, 1987
- Les Voix Grises du Monde Gris, Fleuve Noir, 1987
- Villes vertiges, L'Aurore, 1988
- Swap-Swap, J'ai Lu n° 2836, 1990
- La Guerre en ce Jardin, Fleuve Noir, 1991
- Ombres Blanches, J'ai Lu n° 3455, 1993
- Aube Noire, J'ai Lu n° 3669, 1994
- Le Cimetière des Papillons, J'ai Lu n° 3908, 1995
- La Malédiction de l’Éphémère (revised), J'ai Lu, 1996
- Les Paradis Piégés, J'ai Lu n° 4483, 1997
- Animamea (revised from 2,3,4), Infini sans frontière, 2003
- Deloria, Mnémos, 2006
- Upside Down, Mnémos, 2020

==== Thriller ====
- La route de Mandalay, L'Atalante, 1998
- Gandhara, Séma Editions (Belgium), 2018
- L'Equilibre du mal, Séma Editions (Belgium), 2019

==== Mainstream ====
- Cyberdanse macabre, Flammarion, 1999
- Cyberdanse macabre, France Loisir (Reedition), 2000
- L'Ombre du Che, Flammarion, 2000
- Equinoxes, Evidence Editions, 2020

=== Short novel ===
1. “ Préméditation ”, Extraordinaire Magazine 3-4-5, 1982
2. “ Auto-Régulation 1 ”, Archipel n°3, 1982
3. “ Auto-Régulation 2 ”, Archipel n°4, 1982
4. “ Contribution à l’étude des répercussions névrotiques de l’univers concentrationnaire sur l’individu ” Rivages n°10, 1983
5. “ Deux Silhouettes sur un Mur de Gaufrettes ”, Fiction n°339, 1983
6. “ Ne me quitte pas ”, Espaces Libres n°13, July – September, 1983
7. “ Divertissement tragique ”, Edition Michel Ruf SF livre poche n°2, 1983
8. “ Radiation Blues ”, Rock & Folk 200, September 1983
9. “ Te souviens-tu de Rosa ? ”, Vopaliec n°54 bis, September 1983
10. “ Autorégulation ”, A&A n°86, September 1983
11. “ Le cœur Fracassé ”, Fiction n°345, November 1983
12. “ Les Risques du Métier ”, Fiction n°348, February 1984
13. “ Un si Joli Puits ”, Fiction n°350, April 1984
14. “ Le Passé comme une Corde autour de notre Cou ”, Fiction Spécial Francophonie n°355 Bis, August 1984
15. “ Tentation ”, Français d’Afrique n°11, July 1985
16. “ Ton Linceul sera de Sable ”, Proxima n° 8, 4th quarter 1985
17. “ Délivrance ”, Catalogue Librairie Ailleurs n°9, October 1985
18. “ Flèche d’Azur ”, La Vie du Rail n°2055, July 1986
19. “ C.H.O.I.X. ”, Solaris n°68, July August 1986
20. “ Le Dernier Village ”, Espaces Imaginaires n°4, 4th quarter 1986
21. “ Le Sentier de la Désolation ”, Imagine n°36, October 1986
22. “ Comme un gosse qui entend craquer le monde ”, 10 Ans d’Ailleurs, November 1986
23. “ Étoile ”, J’ai Lu Univers n°88, 1988
24. “ C.H.O.I.X. ”, Proxima n°4, 1988
25. “ Les Risques du métier ”, La frontière éclatée / Grande anthologie de la S.F./ Edition Le Livre de Poche, November 1989
26. “ Sur les Rives de la Mémoire ”, Phénix n°21, April 1990
27. “ Mille Soleils ”, J’ai Lu Univers n°90, June 1990
28. “ Hurlements ”, Atelier du Gué Brèves n°33-34, July 1990
29. “ Le lac des cygnes ”, Phénix n°23, August 1990
30. “ Petit Paul, Petit Jean et mon Oncle ”, Phénix n°26, February 1991
31. “ Villedieu ” coécrit avec J.C. Dunyach, Solaris n°97, May June 1991
32. “ Crever les yeux de Dieu ”, Denoël Territoires de l’Inquiétude n°7,1993
33. “ Vers l’Éternelle Grisaille ”, L’Encrier Renversé n°20, Spring 1995
34. “ Les heureux damnés ”, J’ai Lu Anthologie Genèses, 1996
35. “ Les grenats et les anges ”, Atelier du Gué Brèves n°52, April 1997
36. “ HTTP://WWW.CS.Starsong ”, Galaxies Spécial, March 1998
37. “ Dernier embarquement pour Cythère ”, Fleuve Noir Anthologie Escales sur l’horizon, April 1998
38. “ Retour au Paradis ”, Libération, December 1998
39. “ Le souffleur de rêves ” coécrit avec Noé Gaillard, Fleuve Noir Anthologie Fantasy, January 1999
40. “ Potemkine ”, Solaris Numéro spécial international 127, 1999
41. “ Les Aelhomin ”, coécrit avec Alexis Ulrich, Phénix n° Spécial 50, March 1999
42. “ Souvenirs d’un SpiritKiller ”, Le Soir (Bruxelles), March 1999
43. “ Gorée “, Terres des Ecrivains Site Web, August 1999
44. “ Moi, le maudit ”, Orion Editions Anthologie Privés de Futur, February 2000
45. “ L’homme lourd ”, Festival de Montmorillon 2000, June 2000
46. “ Ton linceul sera de sable ”, Fleuve Noir Anthologie Royaumes, June 2000
47. “ Le souffleur de rêves ” coécrit avec Noé Gaillard, Naturellement Anthologie Forces Obscures, October 2000
48. “ Souvenirs d'un spirit killer ”, Nouvelle Donne n° 22, October 2000
49. “ Délire psycho ”, Phénix n°66, January 2002
50. “ Mille soleils ”, Naturellement Anthologie Les enfants du Mirage/Les chefs-d’œuvre de la SF française 1980-1990, May 2002
51. “ Les enfants du Chaos ", Mnemos Anthologie Icares 2004, November 2003
52. “ Ukiyo-e ”, Revue Imagine, Décember 2004
53. “ Le secret de Mme Hargreaves ”, Mnemos Anthologie Alice, January 2005
54. " L’enfant du futur " Anthologie Elric, Fleuve Noir, 2007
55. " Le choeur malade ", with Noé Gaillard, Galaxies-SF, n° 62, December 2019

== Awards ==
- Solaris Award in 1986 for "C.H.O.I.X"
- Grand prix de l'Imaginaire Award in 1989 for "Étoile"
- Rosny-Aîné award in 1994 for "Ombres blanches" and in 1995 for "Aube noire"
