= Michel Pagel =

French writer

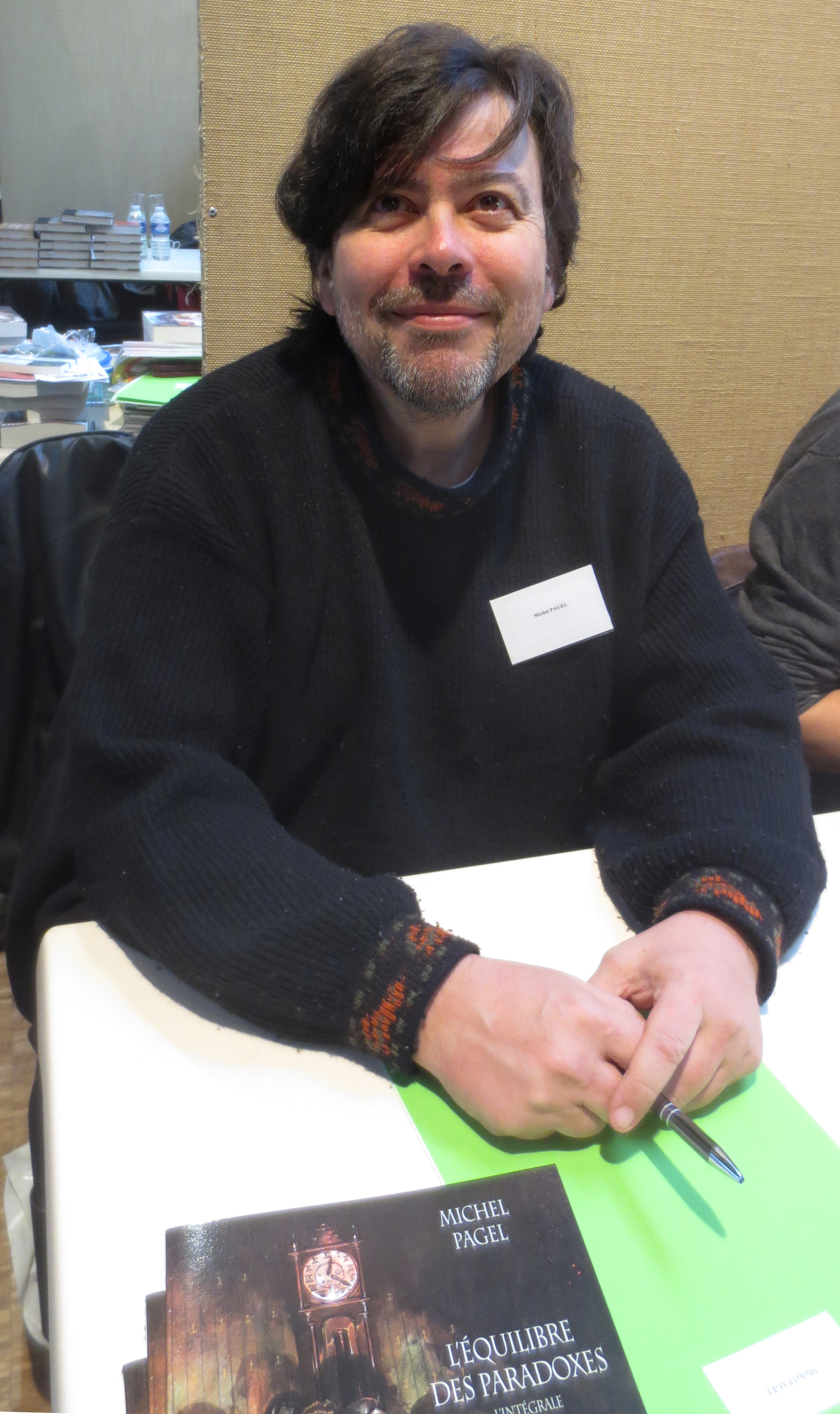
Michel Pagel, November 2016

Michel Pagel (born 1961) is a French science fiction and fantasy writer. He is also a translator. He was first published in the fanzine Espace-Temps in 1977. He is the writer of two series: Les Flammes de la nuit and La Comédie inhumaine, as well as several novels. He won the Prix Rosny-Aîné for L'équilibre des paradoxes, which is classed as an example of modern steampunk.

As a translator he has translated Joe Haldeman's Forever Peace, Neil Gaiman's American Gods, and Sam J. Miller's Kid Wolf and Kraken Boy into French.

== Selected works ==
=== Author ===
- L'équilibre des paradoxes [The balance of paradoxes]. Fleuve Noir. 1999. ISBN 978-2-265-06618-2. Winner of the Prix Rosny-Aîné in 2000.

=== Translator ===
- Miller, Sam J. (2024). Kid Wolf et Kraken Boy. Belial. ISBN 978-2-38163-135-6. Winner of the Prix ActuSF de l'uchronie in 2025.
