= Joël Houssin =

French author

- Born: 29 August 1953
- Died: 22 March 2022 (aged 68)

Joël Houssin (29 August 1953 – 23 March 2022) was a French author of science fiction, fantasy, and crime fiction. Two of his novels won the Grand Prix de l'Imaginaire while a third won the Prix Apollo. He also wrote the film Dobermann, based on his series of police novels, and created the crime/fantasy TV series David Nolande. With Josiane Balasko, he wrote the screenplay of the 1991 film Ma vie est un enfer (My Life Is Hell).
