= Claude Ecken =

French science fiction writer

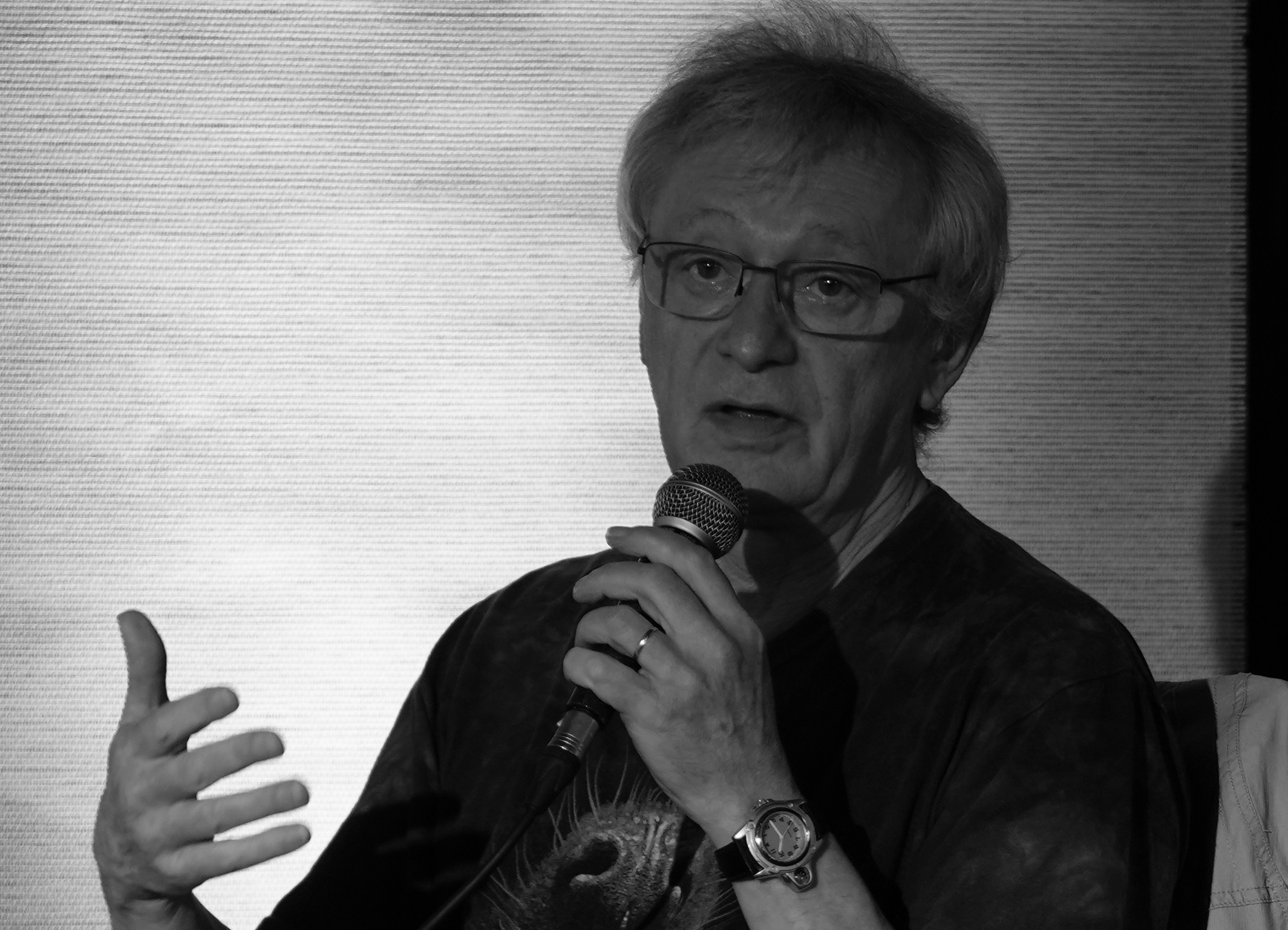
- Genre: science fiction

Claude Ecken (born Claude Eckenschwiller) is a French science fiction writer. He was born in Alsace, France in 1954.

== Fiction ==
=== Novels ===
- La mémoire totale (1985)
- L'univers en pièce (1987)
- La peste verte (1987)
- Auditions coupables (1988)
- De silence et de feu (1989)
- Les enfants du silence (1989)
- L'autre Cécile (1990)
- Le cri du corps (1990)
- Enfer clos (1997)
- Petites vertus virtuelles (1999)
- Les hauts esprits (2005)
- Le monde tous droits réservés (2005)
