= Brain damage (disambiguation) =

Brain damage is the destruction or degeneration of brain cells.

Brain damage or Brain Damage may also refer to:

== Film and TV ==
- Brain Damage (film), a 1988 comedy horror film by Frank Henenlotter
- Brain Damage Films, an Arizona-based horror film distributor and production company

== Music ==
- Brain Damage (band), a French psychedelic rock band formed in 1977
- Brain Damage (dub band), a French Dub band created by Martin Nathan and Raphael Talis in 1999
- Brain Damage (album), a 1981 album by Barbadian-British reggae artist Dennis Bovell
- Brain Damage, an album by Vendetta

=== Songs ===
- "Brain Damage" (Eminem song), a 1999 song from The Slim Shady LP
- "Brain Damage" (Pink Floyd song), a song by Pink Floyd from The Dark Side of the Moon
- "Brain Damage", a song by Fist (band) 1980
- "Brain Damage", a song by The Radiators (Australian band) 1981
- "Brain Damage", a song by Brewer and Shipley 1975

== Other uses ==
- Brain injury, any injury occurring in the brain of a living organism
- Brain Damage (wrestler) or Marvin Lambert (1977–2012), American professional wrestler
- Brain Damage (comics), a British adult comic that was published monthly from 1989 to 1992

== See also ==
- Brian Damage or Brian Keats (1963–2010), punk rock drummer
