= List of minor planets: 428001–429000 =

The following is a partial list of minor planets, running from minor-planet number 428001 through 429000, inclusive. The primary data for this and other partial lists is based on JPL's "Small-Body Orbital Elements" and data available from the Minor Planet Center. Critical list information is also provided by the MPC, unless otherwise specified from Lowell Observatory. A detailed description of the table's columns and additional sources are given on the main page including a complete list of every page in this series, and a statistical break-up on the dynamical classification of minor planets.

Also see the summary list of all named bodies in numerical and alphabetical order, and the corresponding naming citations for the number range of this particular list. New namings may only be added to this list after official publication, as the preannouncement of names is condemned by the Working Group for Small Bodies Nomenclature of the International Astronomical Union.

Near-Earth obj.	MBA (inner)	MBA (outer)	Centaur
Mars-crosser	MBA (middle)	Jupiter trojan	Trans-Neptunian obj.
Unclassified

== 428001–428100 ==
Designation			Discovery			Properties		Ref
Permanent	Provisional	Named after	Date	Site	Discoverer(s)	Category	Diam.	Ref
428001	2006 BM_{38}	—	January 23, 2006	Kitt Peak	Spacewatch	·	2.0 km	MPC · JPL
428002	2006 BO_{45}	—	January 23, 2006	Mount Lemmon	Mount Lemmon Survey	·	1.5 km	MPC · JPL
428003	2006 BK_{67}	—	December 6, 2005	Mount Lemmon	Mount Lemmon Survey	·	1.4 km	MPC · JPL
428004	2006 BX_{67}	—	January 23, 2006	Kitt Peak	Spacewatch	MAR	1.1 km	MPC · JPL
428005	2006 BT_{68}	—	January 23, 2006	Kitt Peak	Spacewatch	·	1.4 km	MPC · JPL
428006	2006 BP_{84}	—	December 5, 2005	Mount Lemmon	Mount Lemmon Survey	·	1.4 km	MPC · JPL
428007	2006 BA_{86}	—	January 25, 2006	Kitt Peak	Spacewatch	·	2.3 km	MPC · JPL
428008	2006 BL_{92}	—	January 26, 2006	Catalina	CSS	MAR	1.4 km	MPC · JPL
428009	2006 BL_{108}	—	January 25, 2006	Kitt Peak	Spacewatch	·	1.5 km	MPC · JPL
428010	2006 BK_{111}	—	January 25, 2006	Kitt Peak	Spacewatch	NEM	1.8 km	MPC · JPL
428011	2006 BM_{113}	—	October 7, 2005	Mount Lemmon	Mount Lemmon Survey	GEF	1.5 km	MPC · JPL
428012	2006 BS_{114}	—	January 26, 2006	Kitt Peak	Spacewatch	·	1.4 km	MPC · JPL
428013	2006 BW_{120}	—	January 26, 2006	Kitt Peak	Spacewatch	EUN	1.1 km	MPC · JPL
428014	2006 BE_{134}	—	January 27, 2006	Mount Lemmon	Mount Lemmon Survey	·	1.3 km	MPC · JPL
428015	2006 BL_{143}	—	January 28, 2006	Mount Lemmon	Mount Lemmon Survey	·	1.7 km	MPC · JPL
428016	2006 BE_{153}	—	January 25, 2006	Kitt Peak	Spacewatch	GEF	1.4 km	MPC · JPL
428017	2006 BB_{159}	—	January 26, 2006	Kitt Peak	Spacewatch	·	1.7 km	MPC · JPL
428018	2006 BP_{159}	—	January 26, 2006	Kitt Peak	Spacewatch	·	1.5 km	MPC · JPL
428019	2006 BO_{184}	—	December 5, 2005	Mount Lemmon	Mount Lemmon Survey	·	1.6 km	MPC · JPL
428020	2006 BA_{219}	—	January 28, 2006	Mount Lemmon	Mount Lemmon Survey	·	1.5 km	MPC · JPL
428021	2006 BS_{219}	—	January 28, 2006	Kitt Peak	Spacewatch	·	1.8 km	MPC · JPL
428022	2006 BS_{231}	—	January 31, 2006	Kitt Peak	Spacewatch	·	1.2 km	MPC · JPL
428023	2006 BB_{237}	—	January 31, 2006	Kitt Peak	Spacewatch	AEO	1.1 km	MPC · JPL
428024	2006 BE_{257}	—	January 31, 2006	Kitt Peak	Spacewatch	·	1.2 km	MPC · JPL
428025	2006 BB_{259}	—	January 31, 2006	Kitt Peak	Spacewatch	AGN	1.1 km	MPC · JPL
428026	2006 BH_{275}	—	January 30, 2006	Kitt Peak	Spacewatch	·	1.6 km	MPC · JPL
428027	2006 BZ_{276}	—	January 26, 2006	Kitt Peak	Spacewatch	AEO	880 m	MPC · JPL
428028	2006 BX_{279}	—	December 22, 2005	Kitt Peak	Spacewatch	·	2.3 km	MPC · JPL
428029	2006 BX_{280}	—	January 23, 2006	Kitt Peak	Spacewatch	AEO	1.1 km	MPC · JPL
428030	2006 CW_{1}	—	February 1, 2006	Kitt Peak	Spacewatch	·	1.5 km	MPC · JPL
428031	2006 CH_{46}	—	January 25, 2006	Kitt Peak	Spacewatch	PAD	1.7 km	MPC · JPL
428032	2006 CG_{62}	—	February 6, 2006	Catalina	CSS	·	2.3 km	MPC · JPL
428033	2006 DF_{12}	—	January 26, 2006	Kitt Peak	Spacewatch	·	2.5 km	MPC · JPL
428034	2006 DG_{16}	—	February 1, 2006	Kitt Peak	Spacewatch	·	2.1 km	MPC · JPL
428035	2006 DC_{17}	—	February 1, 2006	Kitt Peak	Spacewatch	·	1.7 km	MPC · JPL
428036	2006 DA_{30}	—	February 20, 2006	Kitt Peak	Spacewatch	·	2.3 km	MPC · JPL
428037	2006 DA_{31}	—	February 20, 2006	Kitt Peak	Spacewatch	·	1.6 km	MPC · JPL
428038	2006 DL_{34}	—	February 20, 2006	Kitt Peak	Spacewatch	·	3.4 km	MPC · JPL
428039	2006 DT_{35}	—	February 7, 2006	Mount Lemmon	Mount Lemmon Survey	·	2.4 km	MPC · JPL
428040	2006 DH_{43}	—	January 31, 2006	Kitt Peak	Spacewatch	·	1.5 km	MPC · JPL
428041	2006 DB_{48}	—	February 21, 2006	Mount Lemmon	Mount Lemmon Survey	·	1.8 km	MPC · JPL
428042	2006 DL_{54}	—	February 24, 2006	Kitt Peak	Spacewatch	·	1.6 km	MPC · JPL
428043	2006 DR_{82}	—	January 7, 2006	Mount Lemmon	Mount Lemmon Survey	·	2.8 km	MPC · JPL
428044	2006 DJ_{85}	—	February 24, 2006	Mount Lemmon	Mount Lemmon Survey	·	2.1 km	MPC · JPL
428045	2006 DP_{117}	—	February 27, 2006	Kitt Peak	Spacewatch	·	2.0 km	MPC · JPL
428046	2006 DA_{128}	—	January 26, 2006	Mount Lemmon	Mount Lemmon Survey	EUN	1.4 km	MPC · JPL
428047	2006 DY_{128}	—	February 1, 2006	Kitt Peak	Spacewatch	AGN	1.3 km	MPC · JPL
428048	2006 DD_{135}	—	February 25, 2006	Mount Lemmon	Mount Lemmon Survey	·	1.7 km	MPC · JPL
428049	2006 DA_{138}	—	February 25, 2006	Kitt Peak	Spacewatch	·	1.9 km	MPC · JPL
428050	2006 DM_{142}	—	February 25, 2006	Kitt Peak	Spacewatch	·	2.5 km	MPC · JPL
428051	2006 DG_{160}	—	February 27, 2006	Kitt Peak	Spacewatch	·	1.9 km	MPC · JPL
428052	2006 DG_{189}	—	February 27, 2006	Kitt Peak	Spacewatch	DOR	2.9 km	MPC · JPL
428053	2006 DM_{197}	—	February 24, 2006	Catalina	CSS	·	2.7 km	MPC · JPL
428054	2006 DZ_{203}	—	January 6, 2006	Mount Lemmon	Mount Lemmon Survey	·	2.7 km	MPC · JPL
428055	2006 DF_{217}	—	February 21, 2006	Anderson Mesa	LONEOS	·	1.9 km	MPC · JPL
428056	2006 EO	—	March 2, 2006	Kitt Peak	Spacewatch	·	1.8 km	MPC · JPL
428057	2006 ES	—	January 8, 2006	Mount Lemmon	Mount Lemmon Survey	DOR	2.4 km	MPC · JPL
428058	2006 EO_{13}	—	March 2, 2006	Kitt Peak	Spacewatch	·	1.5 km	MPC · JPL
428059	2006 EW_{15}	—	March 2, 2006	Kitt Peak	Spacewatch	·	1.6 km	MPC · JPL
428060	2006 EK_{18}	—	March 2, 2006	Kitt Peak	Spacewatch	·	1.7 km	MPC · JPL
428061	2006 EJ_{20}	—	February 2, 2006	Kitt Peak	Spacewatch	·	2.0 km	MPC · JPL
428062	2006 ER_{39}	—	March 4, 2006	Kitt Peak	Spacewatch	HOF	2.2 km	MPC · JPL
428063	2006 EU_{53}	—	March 3, 2006	Mount Lemmon	Mount Lemmon Survey	·	1.9 km	MPC · JPL
428064	2006 EU_{64}	—	March 5, 2006	Kitt Peak	Spacewatch	·	1.6 km	MPC · JPL
428065	2006 FL_{21}	—	January 26, 2006	Mount Lemmon	Mount Lemmon Survey	AGN	1.1 km	MPC · JPL
428066	2006 FE_{43}	—	March 4, 2006	Mount Lemmon	Mount Lemmon Survey	·	2.4 km	MPC · JPL
428067	2006 GM_{3}	—	April 7, 2006	Wrightwood	J. W. Young	·	2.2 km	MPC · JPL
428068	2006 GE_{7}	—	April 2, 2006	Kitt Peak	Spacewatch	·	1.8 km	MPC · JPL
428069	2006 HM_{8}	—	March 2, 2006	Kitt Peak	Spacewatch	·	2.1 km	MPC · JPL
428070	2006 HP_{22}	—	April 20, 2006	Kitt Peak	Spacewatch	·	2.0 km	MPC · JPL
428071	2006 HY_{44}	—	April 25, 2006	Kitt Peak	Spacewatch	·	1.8 km	MPC · JPL
428072	2006 HP_{52}	—	April 2, 2006	Catalina	CSS	·	2.8 km	MPC · JPL
428073	2006 HQ_{52}	—	April 18, 2006	Catalina	CSS	·	2.3 km	MPC · JPL
428074	2006 HC_{76}	—	April 25, 2006	Kitt Peak	Spacewatch	·	1.9 km	MPC · JPL
428075	2006 HY_{97}	—	April 30, 2006	Kitt Peak	Spacewatch	GEF	1.4 km	MPC · JPL
428076	2006 HH_{106}	—	April 20, 2006	Kitt Peak	Spacewatch	·	1.8 km	MPC · JPL
428077	2006 HO_{132}	—	February 27, 2006	Kitt Peak	Spacewatch	·	1.8 km	MPC · JPL
428078	2006 JG_{20}	—	April 20, 2006	Kitt Peak	Spacewatch	·	2.9 km	MPC · JPL
428079	2006 JL_{52}	—	May 5, 2006	Anderson Mesa	LONEOS	·	2.0 km	MPC · JPL
428080	2006 JG_{80}	—	May 9, 2006	Mount Lemmon	Mount Lemmon Survey	·	2.1 km	MPC · JPL
428081	2006 JR_{80}	—	May 8, 2006	Mount Lemmon	Mount Lemmon Survey	·	750 m	MPC · JPL
428082	2006 KN_{12}	—	May 20, 2006	Kitt Peak	Spacewatch	·	1.6 km	MPC · JPL
428083	2006 KL_{46}	—	November 19, 2003	Kitt Peak	Spacewatch	KOR	1.6 km	MPC · JPL
428084	2006 KT_{71}	—	May 22, 2006	Kitt Peak	Spacewatch	·	1.6 km	MPC · JPL
428085	2006 KB_{85}	—	May 26, 2006	Mount Lemmon	Mount Lemmon Survey	·	2.1 km	MPC · JPL
428086	2006 NM	—	July 3, 2006	Siding Spring	SSS	T_{j} (2.99) · AMO +1km	1.9 km	MPC · JPL
428087	2006 OP_{9}	—	July 24, 2006	Hibiscus	S. F. Hönig	T_{j} (2.98)	3.5 km	MPC · JPL
428088	2006 OQ_{9}	—	July 18, 2006	Mount Lemmon	Mount Lemmon Survey	·	810 m	MPC · JPL
428089	2006 PK_{32}	—	August 15, 2006	Palomar	NEAT	·	4.6 km	MPC · JPL
428090	2006 PU_{32}	—	August 15, 2006	Siding Spring	SSS	·	1.0 km	MPC · JPL
428091	2006 QH_{4}	—	August 18, 2006	Kitt Peak	Spacewatch	PHO	1.2 km	MPC · JPL
428092	2006 QO_{4}	—	August 18, 2006	Vicques	M. Ory	·	5.2 km	MPC · JPL
428093	2006 QE_{16}	—	August 17, 2006	Palomar	NEAT	·	900 m	MPC · JPL
428094	2006 QK_{41}	—	June 21, 2006	Catalina	CSS	·	3.2 km	MPC · JPL
428095	2006 QE_{59}	—	August 19, 2006	Anderson Mesa	LONEOS	·	2.7 km	MPC · JPL
428096	2006 QA_{63}	—	August 24, 2006	Socorro	LINEAR	·	4.4 km	MPC · JPL
428097	2006 QT_{65}	—	August 27, 2006	Kitt Peak	Spacewatch	·	3.8 km	MPC · JPL
428098	2006 QO_{68}	—	August 21, 2006	Kitt Peak	Spacewatch	·	3.3 km	MPC · JPL
428099	2006 QZ_{126}	—	August 16, 2006	Palomar	NEAT	PHO	940 m	MPC · JPL
428100	2006 QJ_{132}	—	August 22, 2006	Palomar	NEAT	T_{j} (2.99)	4.5 km	MPC · JPL

== 428101–428200 ==
back to top

Designation			Discovery			Properties		Ref
Permanent	Provisional	Named after	Date	Site	Discoverer(s)	Category	Diam.	Ref
428101	2006 QD_{135}	—	August 27, 2006	Anderson Mesa	LONEOS	·	3.8 km	MPC · JPL
428102 Rolandwagner	2006 QO_{137}	Rolandwagner	August 30, 2006	Saint-Sulpice	B. Christophe	·	670 m	MPC · JPL
428103	2006 QU_{162}	—	August 21, 2006	Kitt Peak	Spacewatch	·	860 m	MPC · JPL
428104	2006 QT_{182}	—	August 18, 2006	Kitt Peak	Spacewatch	·	760 m	MPC · JPL
428105	2006 QP_{187}	—	August 29, 2006	Anderson Mesa	LONEOS	H	500 m	MPC · JPL
428106	2006 RQ	—	August 28, 2006	Catalina	CSS	·	620 m	MPC · JPL
428107	2006 RO_{6}	—	September 14, 2006	Catalina	CSS	PHO	840 m	MPC · JPL
428108	2006 RY_{8}	—	September 12, 2006	Catalina	CSS	·	660 m	MPC · JPL
428109	2006 RN_{32}	—	September 15, 2006	Kitt Peak	Spacewatch	·	980 m	MPC · JPL
428110	2006 RR_{52}	—	September 14, 2006	Kitt Peak	Spacewatch	·	2.8 km	MPC · JPL
428111	2006 RM_{54}	—	July 21, 2006	Mount Lemmon	Mount Lemmon Survey	·	3.0 km	MPC · JPL
428112	2006 RA_{56}	—	September 14, 2006	Kitt Peak	Spacewatch	·	1.0 km	MPC · JPL
428113	2006 RB_{66}	—	September 14, 2006	Kitt Peak	Spacewatch	V	470 m	MPC · JPL
428114	2006 RS_{68}	—	September 15, 2006	Kitt Peak	Spacewatch	THM	2.4 km	MPC · JPL
428115	2006 RB_{82}	—	September 15, 2006	Kitt Peak	Spacewatch	·	2.9 km	MPC · JPL
428116	2006 RZ_{87}	—	September 15, 2006	Kitt Peak	Spacewatch	·	710 m	MPC · JPL
428117	2006 RK_{99}	—	September 15, 2006	Kitt Peak	Spacewatch	·	850 m	MPC · JPL
428118	2006 RP_{100}	—	September 14, 2006	Catalina	CSS	·	4.2 km	MPC · JPL
428119	2006 RC_{104}	—	September 11, 2006	Apache Point	A. C. Becker	(1118)	3.5 km	MPC · JPL
428120	2006 RX_{108}	—	September 14, 2006	Mauna Kea	Masiero, J.	·	700 m	MPC · JPL
428121	2006 RZ_{110}	—	September 14, 2006	Mauna Kea	Masiero, J.	·	650 m	MPC · JPL
428122	2006 SJ_{2}	—	September 16, 2006	Catalina	CSS	H	450 m	MPC · JPL
428123	2006 SD_{10}	—	August 30, 2006	Anderson Mesa	LONEOS	·	1.4 km	MPC · JPL
428124	2006 SX_{16}	—	July 22, 2006	Mount Lemmon	Mount Lemmon Survey	·	1.2 km	MPC · JPL
428125	2006 SV_{41}	—	September 18, 2006	Anderson Mesa	LONEOS	·	1.2 km	MPC · JPL
428126	2006 SW_{41}	—	September 18, 2006	Anderson Mesa	LONEOS	·	5.8 km	MPC · JPL
428127	2006 SG_{52}	—	September 19, 2006	Anderson Mesa	LONEOS	·	710 m	MPC · JPL
428128	2006 SU_{65}	—	September 19, 2006	Kitt Peak	Spacewatch	·	3.8 km	MPC · JPL
428129	2006 SZ_{67}	—	September 19, 2006	Kitt Peak	Spacewatch	·	2.8 km	MPC · JPL
428130	2006 SO_{72}	—	September 19, 2006	Kitt Peak	Spacewatch	MAS	650 m	MPC · JPL
428131	2006 SM_{73}	—	September 19, 2006	Kitt Peak	Spacewatch	·	970 m	MPC · JPL
428132	2006 ST_{75}	—	September 19, 2006	Kitt Peak	Spacewatch	·	950 m	MPC · JPL
428133	2006 SK_{93}	—	September 18, 2006	Kitt Peak	Spacewatch	·	910 m	MPC · JPL
428134	2006 SV_{95}	—	September 18, 2006	Kitt Peak	Spacewatch	HYG	2.6 km	MPC · JPL
428135	2006 SQ_{103}	—	September 19, 2006	Kitt Peak	Spacewatch	·	3.6 km	MPC · JPL
428136	2006 SJ_{109}	—	September 19, 2006	Kitt Peak	Spacewatch	·	3.9 km	MPC · JPL
428137	2006 SH_{123}	—	February 29, 2004	Kitt Peak	Spacewatch	·	3.8 km	MPC · JPL
428138	2006 SR_{124}	—	September 19, 2006	Catalina	CSS	·	820 m	MPC · JPL
428139	2006 SN_{132}	—	September 16, 2006	Catalina	CSS	·	1.2 km	MPC · JPL
428140	2006 SG_{145}	—	September 19, 2006	Kitt Peak	Spacewatch	HYG	2.8 km	MPC · JPL
428141	2006 SB_{156}	—	September 23, 2006	Kitt Peak	Spacewatch	·	3.1 km	MPC · JPL
428142	2006 SQ_{158}	—	September 23, 2006	Kitt Peak	Spacewatch	·	2.5 km	MPC · JPL
428143	2006 SX_{167}	—	September 17, 2006	Catalina	CSS	·	3.5 km	MPC · JPL
428144	2006 SM_{168}	—	September 25, 2006	Kitt Peak	Spacewatch	·	5.1 km	MPC · JPL
428145	2006 SN_{170}	—	September 25, 2006	Kitt Peak	Spacewatch	·	4.8 km	MPC · JPL
428146	2006 SP_{172}	—	September 25, 2006	Kitt Peak	Spacewatch	·	2.9 km	MPC · JPL
428147	2006 SZ_{175}	—	September 25, 2006	Kitt Peak	Spacewatch	NYS	1.0 km	MPC · JPL
428148	2006 ST_{185}	—	September 25, 2006	Mount Lemmon	Mount Lemmon Survey	H	590 m	MPC · JPL
428149	2006 SK_{215}	—	September 27, 2006	Kitt Peak	Spacewatch	NYS	1.0 km	MPC · JPL
428150	2006 SY_{222}	—	September 25, 2006	Mount Lemmon	Mount Lemmon Survey	·	3.4 km	MPC · JPL
428151	2006 SL_{234}	—	September 26, 2006	Kitt Peak	Spacewatch	·	2.5 km	MPC · JPL
428152	2006 SR_{235}	—	August 18, 2006	Kitt Peak	Spacewatch	·	1.2 km	MPC · JPL
428153	2006 SM_{236}	—	September 26, 2006	Mount Lemmon	Mount Lemmon Survey	·	710 m	MPC · JPL
428154	2006 SD_{256}	—	March 11, 2005	Mount Lemmon	Mount Lemmon Survey	·	590 m	MPC · JPL
428155	2006 SS_{267}	—	September 26, 2006	Kitt Peak	Spacewatch	·	920 m	MPC · JPL
428156	2006 SR_{268}	—	September 26, 2006	Kitt Peak	Spacewatch	·	730 m	MPC · JPL
428157	2006 SB_{272}	—	August 27, 2006	Kitt Peak	Spacewatch	V	530 m	MPC · JPL
428158	2006 SX_{279}	—	September 28, 2006	Kitt Peak	Spacewatch	V	670 m	MPC · JPL
428159	2006 SS_{289}	—	September 19, 2006	Catalina	CSS	·	3.8 km	MPC · JPL
428160	2006 SM_{306}	—	September 27, 2006	Mount Lemmon	Mount Lemmon Survey	·	780 m	MPC · JPL
428161	2006 SD_{311}	—	September 27, 2006	Kitt Peak	Spacewatch	·	1.1 km	MPC · JPL
428162	2006 SX_{338}	—	September 28, 2006	Kitt Peak	Spacewatch	CYB	3.1 km	MPC · JPL
428163	2006 SU_{346}	—	September 28, 2006	Mount Lemmon	Mount Lemmon Survey	H	490 m	MPC · JPL
428164	2006 SB_{361}	—	September 30, 2006	Mount Lemmon	Mount Lemmon Survey	·	790 m	MPC · JPL
428165	2006 SG_{363}	—	September 30, 2006	Mount Lemmon	Mount Lemmon Survey	·	860 m	MPC · JPL
428166	2006 SY_{366}	—	September 20, 2006	Catalina	CSS	·	1.4 km	MPC · JPL
428167	2006 SM_{373}	—	September 16, 2006	Apache Point	A. C. Becker	·	2.5 km	MPC · JPL
428168	2006 SY_{385}	—	September 29, 2006	Apache Point	A. C. Becker	·	3.0 km	MPC · JPL
428169	2006 SP_{392}	—	September 26, 2006	Mount Lemmon	Mount Lemmon Survey	·	1.1 km	MPC · JPL
428170	2006 SO_{395}	—	September 17, 2006	Mauna Kea	Masiero, J.	NYS	770 m	MPC · JPL
428171	2006 SL_{398}	—	September 16, 2006	Kitt Peak	Spacewatch	·	3.4 km	MPC · JPL
428172	2006 SS_{411}	—	September 28, 2006	Kitt Peak	Spacewatch	MAS	690 m	MPC · JPL
428173	2006 TZ_{21}	—	October 11, 2006	Kitt Peak	Spacewatch	NYS	1.1 km	MPC · JPL
428174	2006 TC_{30}	—	September 30, 2006	Mount Lemmon	Mount Lemmon Survey	·	1 km	MPC · JPL
428175	2006 TR_{35}	—	October 12, 2006	Kitt Peak	Spacewatch	NYS	880 m	MPC · JPL
428176	2006 TV_{46}	—	October 12, 2006	Kitt Peak	Spacewatch	·	980 m	MPC · JPL
428177	2006 TT_{71}	—	September 30, 2006	Catalina	CSS	·	800 m	MPC · JPL
428178	2006 TH_{83}	—	February 5, 2000	Kitt Peak	Spacewatch	·	1.2 km	MPC · JPL
428179	2006 TF_{88}	—	October 13, 2006	Kitt Peak	Spacewatch	·	1.2 km	MPC · JPL
428180	2006 TT_{95}	—	October 12, 2006	Kitt Peak	Spacewatch	·	4.8 km	MPC · JPL
428181	2006 TW_{114}	—	October 1, 2006	Apache Point	A. C. Becker	·	3.4 km	MPC · JPL
428182	2006 UY_{3}	—	September 22, 2006	Catalina	CSS	V	640 m	MPC · JPL
428183	2006 UY_{9}	—	October 16, 2006	Kitt Peak	Spacewatch	·	880 m	MPC · JPL
428184	2006 UW_{47}	—	September 16, 2006	Catalina	CSS	(43176)	3.6 km	MPC · JPL
428185	2006 UY_{60}	—	October 19, 2006	Mount Lemmon	Mount Lemmon Survey	·	950 m	MPC · JPL
428186	2006 UO_{68}	—	October 16, 2006	Kitt Peak	Spacewatch	·	2.6 km	MPC · JPL
428187	2006 UP_{71}	—	October 17, 2006	Kitt Peak	Spacewatch	·	3.4 km	MPC · JPL
428188	2006 UC_{84}	—	September 25, 2006	Mount Lemmon	Mount Lemmon Survey	MAS	690 m	MPC · JPL
428189	2006 UE_{87}	—	October 17, 2006	Mount Lemmon	Mount Lemmon Survey	·	1.0 km	MPC · JPL
428190	2006 UG_{87}	—	October 17, 2006	Mount Lemmon	Mount Lemmon Survey	NYS	750 m	MPC · JPL
428191	2006 UC_{103}	—	October 2, 2006	Mount Lemmon	Mount Lemmon Survey	·	950 m	MPC · JPL
428192	2006 UL_{110}	—	October 19, 2006	Kitt Peak	Spacewatch	·	5.1 km	MPC · JPL
428193	2006 UW_{121}	—	October 19, 2006	Kitt Peak	Spacewatch	NYS	1.1 km	MPC · JPL
428194	2006 UC_{133}	—	October 19, 2006	Kitt Peak	Spacewatch	·	1.0 km	MPC · JPL
428195	2006 UW_{140}	—	October 19, 2006	Kitt Peak	Spacewatch	·	1.1 km	MPC · JPL
428196	2006 UM_{156}	—	October 21, 2006	Catalina	CSS	·	3.2 km	MPC · JPL
428197	2006 UZ_{161}	—	October 2, 2006	Mount Lemmon	Mount Lemmon Survey	CYB	2.9 km	MPC · JPL
428198	2006 UA_{164}	—	October 2, 2006	Mount Lemmon	Mount Lemmon Survey	·	940 m	MPC · JPL
428199	2006 UN_{166}	—	October 21, 2006	Mount Lemmon	Mount Lemmon Survey	·	3.9 km	MPC · JPL
428200	2006 US_{220}	—	October 17, 2006	Kitt Peak	Spacewatch	·	3.4 km	MPC · JPL

== 428201–428300 ==
back to top

Designation			Discovery			Properties		Ref
Permanent	Provisional	Named after	Date	Site	Discoverer(s)	Category	Diam.	Ref
428201	2006 UU_{230}	—	October 21, 2006	Palomar	NEAT	MAS	810 m	MPC · JPL
428202	2006 UO_{252}	—	September 26, 2006	Mount Lemmon	Mount Lemmon Survey	·	920 m	MPC · JPL
428203	2006 UQ_{268}	—	October 27, 2006	Mount Lemmon	Mount Lemmon Survey	MAS	540 m	MPC · JPL
428204	2006 UX_{269}	—	October 4, 2006	Mount Lemmon	Mount Lemmon Survey	·	810 m	MPC · JPL
428205	2006 UO_{278}	—	September 28, 2006	Mount Lemmon	Mount Lemmon Survey	NYS	970 m	MPC · JPL
428206	2006 UL_{280}	—	October 28, 2006	Mount Lemmon	Mount Lemmon Survey	MAS	690 m	MPC · JPL
428207	2006 UO_{281}	—	September 25, 2006	Mount Lemmon	Mount Lemmon Survey	·	1.0 km	MPC · JPL
428208	2006 UB_{330}	—	October 16, 2006	Apache Point	A. C. Becker	MAS	600 m	MPC · JPL
428209	2006 VC	—	November 1, 2006	Catalina	CSS	APO · PHA	340 m	MPC · JPL
428210	2006 VQ_{7}	—	September 27, 2006	Mount Lemmon	Mount Lemmon Survey	NYS	940 m	MPC · JPL
428211	2006 VK_{16}	—	October 21, 2006	Kitt Peak	Spacewatch	·	1.0 km	MPC · JPL
428212	2006 VS_{18}	—	November 9, 2006	Kitt Peak	Spacewatch	·	1.0 km	MPC · JPL
428213	2006 VQ_{20}	—	November 9, 2006	Kitt Peak	Spacewatch	·	820 m	MPC · JPL
428214	2006 VC_{32}	—	November 11, 2006	Mount Lemmon	Mount Lemmon Survey	·	800 m	MPC · JPL
428215	2006 VH_{36}	—	November 11, 2006	Catalina	CSS	·	1.4 km	MPC · JPL
428216	2006 VA_{48}	—	September 27, 2006	Mount Lemmon	Mount Lemmon Survey	(260) · CYB	3.4 km	MPC · JPL
428217	2006 VP_{74}	—	October 21, 2006	Mount Lemmon	Mount Lemmon Survey	·	1.2 km	MPC · JPL
428218	2006 VD_{111}	—	October 4, 2006	Mount Lemmon	Mount Lemmon Survey	·	1.3 km	MPC · JPL
428219	2006 VB_{114}	—	October 20, 2006	Kitt Peak	Spacewatch	MAS	640 m	MPC · JPL
428220	2006 VR_{120}	—	October 21, 2006	Kitt Peak	Spacewatch	·	1.1 km	MPC · JPL
428221	2006 VY_{123}	—	November 14, 2006	Kitt Peak	Spacewatch	·	1.1 km	MPC · JPL
428222	2006 VV_{136}	—	November 15, 2006	Kitt Peak	Spacewatch	·	970 m	MPC · JPL
428223	2006 WW	—	November 17, 2006	Catalina	CSS	T_{j} (2.53) · APO +1km	2.5 km	MPC · JPL
428224	2006 WX_{34}	—	November 16, 2006	Kitt Peak	Spacewatch	·	1.6 km	MPC · JPL
428225	2006 WU_{35}	—	November 16, 2006	Kitt Peak	Spacewatch	·	1.0 km	MPC · JPL
428226	2006 WW_{47}	—	November 16, 2006	Kitt Peak	Spacewatch	·	860 m	MPC · JPL
428227	2006 WD_{95}	—	November 19, 2006	Kitt Peak	Spacewatch	·	1.2 km	MPC · JPL
428228	2006 WP_{114}	—	November 15, 2006	Catalina	CSS	·	880 m	MPC · JPL
428229	2006 WU_{124}	—	November 15, 2006	Catalina	CSS	·	980 m	MPC · JPL
428230	2006 WD_{153}	—	November 21, 2006	Mount Lemmon	Mount Lemmon Survey	NYS	1.1 km	MPC · JPL
428231	2006 WX_{153}	—	November 22, 2006	Kitt Peak	Spacewatch	·	1.1 km	MPC · JPL
428232	2006 WP_{167}	—	October 20, 2006	Mount Lemmon	Mount Lemmon Survey	PHO	860 m	MPC · JPL
428233	2006 WC_{168}	—	November 11, 2006	Kitt Peak	Spacewatch	·	880 m	MPC · JPL
428234	2006 WV_{182}	—	November 24, 2006	Kitt Peak	Spacewatch	·	1.3 km	MPC · JPL
428235	2006 XE_{11}	—	October 21, 2006	Kitt Peak	Spacewatch	·	810 m	MPC · JPL
428236	2006 XO_{13}	—	December 10, 2006	Kitt Peak	Spacewatch	MAS	540 m	MPC · JPL
428237	2006 XO_{22}	—	November 10, 2006	Kitt Peak	Spacewatch	·	1.0 km	MPC · JPL
428238	2006 XP_{28}	—	November 17, 2006	Mount Lemmon	Mount Lemmon Survey	NYS	1.2 km	MPC · JPL
428239	2006 XL_{58}	—	November 22, 2006	Mount Lemmon	Mount Lemmon Survey	NYS	1.0 km	MPC · JPL
428240	2006 XS_{61}	—	December 15, 2006	Kitt Peak	Spacewatch	MAS	740 m	MPC · JPL
428241	2006 XF_{70}	—	December 13, 2006	Mount Lemmon	Mount Lemmon Survey	MAS	640 m	MPC · JPL
428242	2006 YF_{10}	—	November 16, 2006	Kitt Peak	Spacewatch	NYS	1.0 km	MPC · JPL
428243	2006 YE_{19}	—	December 24, 2006	Kitt Peak	Spacewatch	·	940 m	MPC · JPL
428244	2006 YH_{22}	—	November 12, 2006	Mount Lemmon	Mount Lemmon Survey	NYS	980 m	MPC · JPL
428245	2006 YQ_{31}	—	December 1, 2006	Mount Lemmon	Mount Lemmon Survey	·	1.1 km	MPC · JPL
428246	2006 YS_{52}	—	December 21, 2006	Kitt Peak	Spacewatch	·	1.0 km	MPC · JPL
428247	2007 AP_{2}	—	January 8, 2007	Catalina	CSS	H	680 m	MPC · JPL
428248	2007 AY_{15}	—	November 18, 2006	Mount Lemmon	Mount Lemmon Survey	NYS	1.2 km	MPC · JPL
428249	2007 BE_{1}	—	January 16, 2007	Catalina	CSS	·	1.2 km	MPC · JPL
428250	2007 BS_{7}	—	January 17, 2007	Kitt Peak	Spacewatch	H	560 m	MPC · JPL
428251	2007 BT_{21}	—	January 24, 2007	Socorro	LINEAR	CYB	4.5 km	MPC · JPL
428252	2007 BC_{22}	—	November 27, 2006	Mount Lemmon	Mount Lemmon Survey	·	940 m	MPC · JPL
428253	2007 BV_{49}	—	January 25, 2007	Catalina	CSS	·	1.4 km	MPC · JPL
428254	2007 BO_{58}	—	January 17, 2007	Kitt Peak	Spacewatch	H	560 m	MPC · JPL
428255	2007 BQ_{61}	—	December 21, 2006	Kitt Peak	Spacewatch	·	1.1 km	MPC · JPL
428256	2007 BS_{69}	—	January 27, 2007	Kitt Peak	Spacewatch	BRG	1.7 km	MPC · JPL
428257	2007 BW_{72}	—	January 25, 2007	Catalina	CSS	H	520 m	MPC · JPL
428258	2007 BG_{100}	—	January 17, 2007	Kitt Peak	Spacewatch	·	1.1 km	MPC · JPL
428259 Laphil	2007 CA_{6}	Laphil	February 5, 2007	Lulin	Q. Ye, H.-C. Lin	·	1.2 km	MPC · JPL
428260	2007 CZ_{17}	—	February 8, 2007	Mount Lemmon	Mount Lemmon Survey	·	1.3 km	MPC · JPL
428261	2007 CW_{25}	—	January 17, 2007	Catalina	CSS	·	1.7 km	MPC · JPL
428262	2007 CT_{60}	—	February 10, 2007	Catalina	CSS	·	1.6 km	MPC · JPL
428263	2007 CR_{63}	—	February 8, 2007	Kitt Peak	Spacewatch	H	520 m	MPC · JPL
428264	2007 CO_{65}	—	February 10, 2007	Mount Lemmon	Mount Lemmon Survey	EUN · slow	1.2 km	MPC · JPL
428265	2007 CG_{66}	—	February 10, 2007	Mount Lemmon	Mount Lemmon Survey	·	1.2 km	MPC · JPL
428266	2007 DG_{28}	—	February 17, 2007	Kitt Peak	Spacewatch	·	1.2 km	MPC · JPL
428267	2007 DB_{33}	—	February 17, 2007	Kitt Peak	Spacewatch	·	1.2 km	MPC · JPL
428268	2007 DR_{43}	—	February 17, 2007	Kitt Peak	Spacewatch	H	600 m	MPC · JPL
428269	2007 DW_{47}	—	February 21, 2007	Mount Lemmon	Mount Lemmon Survey	·	1.5 km	MPC · JPL
428270	2007 DO_{55}	—	February 21, 2007	Kitt Peak	Spacewatch	·	1.0 km	MPC · JPL
428271	2007 DM_{61}	—	February 19, 2007	Catalina	CSS	H	740 m	MPC · JPL
428272	2007 DN_{63}	—	February 8, 2007	Kitt Peak	Spacewatch	·	1.1 km	MPC · JPL
428273	2007 DM_{64}	—	February 21, 2007	Kitt Peak	Spacewatch	·	810 m	MPC · JPL
428274	2007 DT_{91}	—	February 23, 2007	Mount Lemmon	Mount Lemmon Survey	·	1.1 km	MPC · JPL
428275	2007 DM_{111}	—	February 25, 2007	Mount Lemmon	Mount Lemmon Survey	·	1.2 km	MPC · JPL
428276	2007 EJ_{25}	—	March 10, 2007	Mount Lemmon	Mount Lemmon Survey	·	1.8 km	MPC · JPL
428277	2007 ED_{34}	—	February 21, 2007	Mount Lemmon	Mount Lemmon Survey	MAR	890 m	MPC · JPL
428278	2007 EJ_{53}	—	February 23, 2007	Kitt Peak	Spacewatch	·	1.3 km	MPC · JPL
428279	2007 EX_{59}	—	March 9, 2007	Mount Lemmon	Mount Lemmon Survey	·	1.1 km	MPC · JPL
428280	2007 ED_{67}	—	March 10, 2007	Kitt Peak	Spacewatch	·	1.0 km	MPC · JPL
428281	2007 ER_{84}	—	March 12, 2007	Catalina	CSS	·	1.4 km	MPC · JPL
428282	2007 EA_{85}	—	March 24, 2003	Kitt Peak	Spacewatch	(5)	1.2 km	MPC · JPL
428283	2007 ET_{96}	—	March 10, 2007	Mount Lemmon	Mount Lemmon Survey	·	1.4 km	MPC · JPL
428284	2007 EL_{100}	—	March 27, 2003	Kitt Peak	Spacewatch	·	920 m	MPC · JPL
428285	2007 EK_{102}	—	March 11, 2007	Kitt Peak	Spacewatch	·	1.4 km	MPC · JPL
428286	2007 EN_{103}	—	March 11, 2007	Mount Lemmon	Mount Lemmon Survey	·	1.0 km	MPC · JPL
428287	2007 EC_{117}	—	March 13, 2007	Mount Lemmon	Mount Lemmon Survey	KON	1.9 km	MPC · JPL
428288	2007 EX_{120}	—	February 13, 2007	Mount Lemmon	Mount Lemmon Survey	PHO	3.4 km	MPC · JPL
428289	2007 EJ_{126}	—	January 27, 2007	Kitt Peak	Spacewatch	·	900 m	MPC · JPL
428290	2007 EH_{130}	—	March 9, 2007	Mount Lemmon	Mount Lemmon Survey	·	960 m	MPC · JPL
428291	2007 EL_{131}	—	March 9, 2007	Mount Lemmon	Mount Lemmon Survey	·	910 m	MPC · JPL
428292	2007 EX_{137}	—	March 11, 2007	Kitt Peak	Spacewatch	EUN	1.3 km	MPC · JPL
428293	2007 EL_{139}	—	March 12, 2007	Kitt Peak	Spacewatch	·	1.8 km	MPC · JPL
428294	2007 EL_{145}	—	March 12, 2007	Mount Lemmon	Mount Lemmon Survey	·	1.3 km	MPC · JPL
428295	2007 ED_{149}	—	March 12, 2007	Mount Lemmon	Mount Lemmon Survey	·	1.3 km	MPC · JPL
428296	2007 EE_{174}	—	March 14, 2007	Kitt Peak	Spacewatch	·	1.5 km	MPC · JPL
428297	2007 EN_{182}	—	February 26, 2007	Mount Lemmon	Mount Lemmon Survey	·	1.3 km	MPC · JPL
428298	2007 EY_{192}	—	December 4, 2005	Kitt Peak	Spacewatch	EUN	1.5 km	MPC · JPL
428299	2007 EL_{198}	—	March 10, 2007	Kitt Peak	Spacewatch	H	690 m	MPC · JPL
428300	2007 EB_{214}	—	March 12, 2007	Kitt Peak	Spacewatch	·	830 m	MPC · JPL

== 428301–428400 ==
back to top

Designation			Discovery			Properties		Ref
Permanent	Provisional	Named after	Date	Site	Discoverer(s)	Category	Diam.	Ref
428301	2007 EG_{214}	—	March 12, 2007	Catalina	CSS	·	1.9 km	MPC · JPL
428302	2007 EB_{218}	—	March 9, 2007	Mount Lemmon	Mount Lemmon Survey	·	800 m	MPC · JPL
428303	2007 EF_{223}	—	March 15, 2007	Catalina	CSS	EUN	1.6 km	MPC · JPL
428304	2007 FG_{6}	—	March 16, 2007	Mount Lemmon	Mount Lemmon Survey	EUN	1.3 km	MPC · JPL
428305	2007 FY_{12}	—	March 13, 2007	Catalina	CSS	·	2.1 km	MPC · JPL
428306	2007 FN_{16}	—	March 10, 2007	Mount Lemmon	Mount Lemmon Survey	·	1.8 km	MPC · JPL
428307	2007 FP_{18}	—	March 20, 2007	Socorro	LINEAR	H	690 m	MPC · JPL
428308	2007 FC_{25}	—	March 20, 2007	Kitt Peak	Spacewatch	·	990 m	MPC · JPL
428309	2007 FX_{39}	—	March 17, 2007	Anderson Mesa	LONEOS	H	640 m	MPC · JPL
428310	2007 FH_{44}	—	March 25, 2007	Mount Lemmon	Mount Lemmon Survey	·	1.7 km	MPC · JPL
428311	2007 FY_{49}	—	March 20, 2007	Catalina	CSS	·	2.2 km	MPC · JPL
428312	2007 GF_{3}	—	April 7, 2007	Mount Lemmon	Mount Lemmon Survey	·	1.6 km	MPC · JPL
428313	2007 GT_{8}	—	April 7, 2007	Mount Lemmon	Mount Lemmon Survey	·	1.2 km	MPC · JPL
428314	2007 GD_{20}	—	April 11, 2007	Kitt Peak	Spacewatch	·	1.6 km	MPC · JPL
428315	2007 GG_{22}	—	April 11, 2007	Mount Lemmon	Mount Lemmon Survey	·	1.3 km	MPC · JPL
428316	2007 GV_{33}	—	April 11, 2007	Mount Lemmon	Mount Lemmon Survey	·	2.2 km	MPC · JPL
428317	2007 GM_{44}	—	April 14, 2007	Kitt Peak	Spacewatch	·	1.2 km	MPC · JPL
428318	2007 GY_{49}	—	March 14, 2007	Mount Lemmon	Mount Lemmon Survey	·	1.6 km	MPC · JPL
428319	2007 GN_{67}	—	April 15, 2007	Kitt Peak	Spacewatch	(5)	1.0 km	MPC · JPL
428320	2007 GV_{68}	—	April 15, 2007	Mount Lemmon	Mount Lemmon Survey	MAR	890 m	MPC · JPL
428321	2007 GL_{77}	—	April 15, 2007	Catalina	CSS	·	1.6 km	MPC · JPL
428322	2007 HC_{13}	—	February 25, 2007	Mount Lemmon	Mount Lemmon Survey	·	1.4 km	MPC · JPL
428323	2007 HH_{25}	—	April 18, 2007	Kitt Peak	Spacewatch	·	1.3 km	MPC · JPL
428324	2007 HL_{30}	—	April 19, 2007	Mount Lemmon	Mount Lemmon Survey	·	1.2 km	MPC · JPL
428325	2007 HL_{45}	—	April 18, 2007	Kitt Peak	Spacewatch	·	1.3 km	MPC · JPL
428326	2007 HW_{46}	—	April 20, 2007	Kitt Peak	Spacewatch	·	1.5 km	MPC · JPL
428327	2007 HJ_{52}	—	April 20, 2007	Kitt Peak	Spacewatch	·	1.4 km	MPC · JPL
428328	2007 HP_{56}	—	April 22, 2007	Catalina	CSS	·	1.8 km	MPC · JPL
428329	2007 HW_{68}	—	April 23, 2007	Mount Lemmon	Mount Lemmon Survey	·	1.5 km	MPC · JPL
428330	2007 HP_{73}	—	April 14, 2007	Kitt Peak	Spacewatch	·	1.1 km	MPC · JPL
428331	2007 HV_{73}	—	March 15, 2007	Mount Lemmon	Mount Lemmon Survey	·	1.8 km	MPC · JPL
428332	2007 HV_{77}	—	February 16, 2007	Mount Lemmon	Mount Lemmon Survey	·	1.2 km	MPC · JPL
428333	2007 HK_{84}	—	April 22, 2007	Mount Lemmon	Mount Lemmon Survey	MAR	990 m	MPC · JPL
428334	2007 HT_{86}	—	April 24, 2007	Kitt Peak	Spacewatch	·	2.2 km	MPC · JPL
428335	2007 HA_{87}	—	April 24, 2007	Kitt Peak	Spacewatch	·	1.4 km	MPC · JPL
428336	2007 HL_{90}	—	April 23, 2007	Catalina	CSS	ADE	2.5 km	MPC · JPL
428337	2007 HB_{97}	—	April 16, 2007	Catalina	CSS	·	2.4 km	MPC · JPL
428338	2007 HC_{98}	—	April 24, 2007	Mount Lemmon	Mount Lemmon Survey	MAR	1.0 km	MPC · JPL
428339	2007 JL_{2}	—	May 7, 2007	Purple Mountain	PMO NEO Survey Program	·	3.4 km	MPC · JPL
428340	2007 KR_{4}	—	May 24, 2007	Kitt Peak	Spacewatch	·	1.4 km	MPC · JPL
428341	2007 KS_{6}	—	May 11, 2007	Mount Lemmon	Mount Lemmon Survey	·	2.0 km	MPC · JPL
428342	2007 KE_{8}	—	May 17, 2007	Catalina	CSS	·	1.9 km	MPC · JPL
428343	2007 LA_{2}	—	May 12, 2007	Mount Lemmon	Mount Lemmon Survey	·	1.3 km	MPC · JPL
428344	2007 LB_{2}	—	June 7, 2007	Kitt Peak	Spacewatch	·	1.4 km	MPC · JPL
428345	2007 LQ_{4}	—	March 15, 2007	Mount Lemmon	Mount Lemmon Survey	·	2.6 km	MPC · JPL
428346	2007 LS_{23}	—	June 14, 2007	Kitt Peak	Spacewatch	EUN	1.3 km	MPC · JPL
428347	2007 LR_{30}	—	June 11, 2007	Mauna Kea	D. D. Balam	L4	7.5 km	MPC · JPL
428348	2007 MV_{1}	—	June 17, 2007	Kitt Peak	Spacewatch	·	2.6 km	MPC · JPL
428349	2007 MQ_{5}	—	June 17, 2007	Kitt Peak	Spacewatch	·	2.2 km	MPC · JPL
428350	2007 MA_{17}	—	March 15, 2007	Mount Lemmon	Mount Lemmon Survey	·	1.6 km	MPC · JPL
428351 Martinchalifour	2007 OT_{5}	Martinchalifour	July 22, 2007	Lulin	Q. Ye, H.-C. Lin	·	1.8 km	MPC · JPL
428352	2007 OV_{7}	—	May 13, 2007	Catalina	CSS	·	8.1 km	MPC · JPL
428353	2007 PD_{32}	—	August 8, 2007	Socorro	LINEAR	·	4.4 km	MPC · JPL
428354	2007 PZ_{49}	—	August 10, 2007	Kitt Peak	Spacewatch	KOR	1.3 km	MPC · JPL
428355	2007 QS_{13}	—	August 24, 2007	Kitt Peak	Spacewatch	·	2.8 km	MPC · JPL
428356	2007 RW_{21}	—	September 3, 2007	Catalina	CSS	·	2.7 km	MPC · JPL
428357	2007 RK_{30}	—	September 5, 2007	Anderson Mesa	LONEOS	·	3.1 km	MPC · JPL
428358	2007 RH_{47}	—	September 9, 2007	Mount Lemmon	Mount Lemmon Survey	·	2.7 km	MPC · JPL
428359	2007 RT_{48}	—	September 9, 2007	Mount Lemmon	Mount Lemmon Survey	·	3.7 km	MPC · JPL
428360	2007 RW_{57}	—	September 9, 2007	Anderson Mesa	LONEOS	·	3.1 km	MPC · JPL
428361	2007 RL_{59}	—	September 10, 2007	Kitt Peak	Spacewatch	·	3.0 km	MPC · JPL
428362	2007 RW_{64}	—	September 10, 2007	Mount Lemmon	Mount Lemmon Survey	·	1.8 km	MPC · JPL
428363	2007 RQ_{94}	—	September 10, 2007	Kitt Peak	Spacewatch	·	600 m	MPC · JPL
428364	2007 RH_{96}	—	September 10, 2007	Kitt Peak	Spacewatch	·	2.2 km	MPC · JPL
428365	2007 RH_{102}	—	September 11, 2007	Catalina	CSS	THB	3.1 km	MPC · JPL
428366	2007 RR_{112}	—	September 11, 2007	Kitt Peak	Spacewatch	·	3.1 km	MPC · JPL
428367	2007 RX_{132}	—	September 13, 2007	Altschwendt	W. Ries	·	2.0 km	MPC · JPL
428368	2007 RV_{136}	—	September 14, 2007	Mount Lemmon	Mount Lemmon Survey	·	2.6 km	MPC · JPL
428369	2007 RQ_{182}	—	September 12, 2007	Mount Lemmon	Mount Lemmon Survey	·	3.3 km	MPC · JPL
428370	2007 RL_{195}	—	September 12, 2007	Kitt Peak	Spacewatch	HYG	2.5 km	MPC · JPL
428371	2007 RZ_{202}	—	September 13, 2007	Kitt Peak	Spacewatch	·	3.2 km	MPC · JPL
428372	2007 RU_{206}	—	September 10, 2007	Kitt Peak	Spacewatch	·	1.7 km	MPC · JPL
428373	2007 RO_{212}	—	September 11, 2007	Purple Mountain	PMO NEO Survey Program	·	2.3 km	MPC · JPL
428374	2007 RQ_{215}	—	September 12, 2007	Kitt Peak	Spacewatch	·	650 m	MPC · JPL
428375	2007 RB_{234}	—	September 12, 2007	Catalina	CSS	·	3.5 km	MPC · JPL
428376	2007 RG_{252}	—	September 13, 2007	Catalina	CSS	T_{j} (2.99)	3.4 km	MPC · JPL
428377	2007 RG_{253}	—	September 13, 2007	Mount Lemmon	Mount Lemmon Survey	·	550 m	MPC · JPL
428378	2007 RL_{258}	—	September 14, 2007	Kitt Peak	Spacewatch	·	1.2 km	MPC · JPL
428379	2007 RS_{261}	—	September 14, 2007	Kitt Peak	Spacewatch	·	3.1 km	MPC · JPL
428380	2007 RK_{280}	—	September 13, 2007	Catalina	CSS	·	3.4 km	MPC · JPL
428381	2007 RX_{283}	—	September 9, 2007	Kitt Peak	Spacewatch	EOS	2.0 km	MPC · JPL
428382	2007 RE_{285}	—	September 13, 2007	Mount Lemmon	Mount Lemmon Survey	·	3.0 km	MPC · JPL
428383	2007 RL_{292}	—	September 12, 2007	Mount Lemmon	Mount Lemmon Survey	·	4.0 km	MPC · JPL
428384	2007 RX_{292}	—	September 12, 2007	Mount Lemmon	Mount Lemmon Survey	THM	2.1 km	MPC · JPL
428385	2007 RH_{294}	—	September 13, 2007	Kitt Peak	Spacewatch	·	1.3 km	MPC · JPL
428386	2007 RB_{299}	—	September 13, 2007	Kitt Peak	Spacewatch	·	2.6 km	MPC · JPL
428387	2007 RH_{300}	—	September 14, 2007	Catalina	CSS	BRA	1.7 km	MPC · JPL
428388	2007 RR_{301}	—	September 13, 2007	Mount Lemmon	Mount Lemmon Survey	·	2.7 km	MPC · JPL
428389	2007 RW_{315}	—	September 13, 2007	Catalina	CSS	LIX	3.6 km	MPC · JPL
428390	2007 RM_{319}	—	September 12, 2007	Mount Lemmon	Mount Lemmon Survey	·	3.8 km	MPC · JPL
428391	2007 RG_{320}	—	September 13, 2007	Kitt Peak	Spacewatch	·	5.1 km	MPC · JPL
428392	2007 RE_{321}	—	September 13, 2007	Socorro	LINEAR	·	620 m	MPC · JPL
428393	2007 RH_{324}	—	September 14, 2007	Mount Lemmon	Mount Lemmon Survey	·	3.4 km	MPC · JPL
428394	2007 SS_{8}	—	September 18, 2007	Kitt Peak	Spacewatch	EOS	1.7 km	MPC · JPL
428395	2007 SX_{8}	—	September 11, 2007	Kitt Peak	Spacewatch	KOR	1.8 km	MPC · JPL
428396	2007 SY_{10}	—	September 21, 2007	Bergisch Gladbach	W. Bickel	·	3.8 km	MPC · JPL
428397	2007 SH_{17}	—	September 12, 2007	Catalina	CSS	BRA	1.7 km	MPC · JPL
428398	2007 SZ_{22}	—	September 21, 2007	Kitt Peak	Spacewatch	·	610 m	MPC · JPL
428399	2007 SO_{23}	—	September 21, 2007	XuYi	PMO NEO Survey Program	EOS	2.4 km	MPC · JPL
428400	2007 TA_{3}	—	January 16, 2004	Kitt Peak	Spacewatch	·	2.0 km	MPC · JPL

== 428401–428500 ==
back to top

Designation			Discovery			Properties		Ref
Permanent	Provisional	Named after	Date	Site	Discoverer(s)	Category	Diam.	Ref
428401	2007 TZ_{14}	—	October 8, 2007	7300	W. K. Y. Yeung	·	3.3 km	MPC · JPL
428402	2007 TQ_{32}	—	October 6, 2007	Kitt Peak	Spacewatch	·	1.8 km	MPC · JPL
428403	2007 TL_{39}	—	October 6, 2007	Kitt Peak	Spacewatch	·	2.4 km	MPC · JPL
428404	2007 TZ_{48}	—	October 4, 2007	Kitt Peak	Spacewatch	·	2.8 km	MPC · JPL
428405	2007 TY_{52}	—	October 4, 2007	Kitt Peak	Spacewatch	EOS	2.1 km	MPC · JPL
428406	2007 TK_{55}	—	October 4, 2007	Kitt Peak	Spacewatch	EOS	2.2 km	MPC · JPL
428407	2007 TF_{57}	—	October 4, 2007	Kitt Peak	Spacewatch	EOS	2.0 km	MPC · JPL
428408	2007 TT_{79}	—	October 6, 2007	Kitt Peak	Spacewatch	·	2.5 km	MPC · JPL
428409	2007 TP_{91}	—	October 4, 2007	Kitt Peak	Spacewatch	·	5.4 km	MPC · JPL
428410	2007 TY_{94}	—	October 7, 2007	Catalina	CSS	·	2.8 km	MPC · JPL
428411	2007 TV_{96}	—	October 8, 2007	Mount Lemmon	Mount Lemmon Survey	·	2.3 km	MPC · JPL
428412	2007 TX_{97}	—	October 8, 2007	Mount Lemmon	Mount Lemmon Survey	·	2.3 km	MPC · JPL
428413	2007 TA_{117}	—	October 9, 2007	Anderson Mesa	LONEOS	·	550 m	MPC · JPL
428414	2007 TS_{119}	—	October 9, 2007	Mount Lemmon	Mount Lemmon Survey	·	3.0 km	MPC · JPL
428415	2007 TS_{122}	—	October 6, 2007	Kitt Peak	Spacewatch	EOS	1.9 km	MPC · JPL
428416	2007 TV_{128}	—	October 6, 2007	Kitt Peak	Spacewatch	·	3.1 km	MPC · JPL
428417	2007 TZ_{130}	—	September 8, 2007	Mount Lemmon	Mount Lemmon Survey	·	690 m	MPC · JPL
428418	2007 TR_{140}	—	October 9, 2007	Mount Lemmon	Mount Lemmon Survey	EOS	2.2 km	MPC · JPL
428419	2007 TA_{153}	—	October 9, 2007	Socorro	LINEAR	·	2.9 km	MPC · JPL
428420	2007 TE_{173}	—	October 4, 2007	Kitt Peak	Spacewatch	EOS	2.0 km	MPC · JPL
428421	2007 TR_{177}	—	October 6, 2007	Kitt Peak	Spacewatch	·	3.2 km	MPC · JPL
428422	2007 TW_{178}	—	September 15, 2007	Kitt Peak	Spacewatch	·	1.9 km	MPC · JPL
428423	2007 TE_{192}	—	October 5, 2007	Kitt Peak	Spacewatch	·	3.0 km	MPC · JPL
428424	2007 TY_{196}	—	October 8, 2007	Kitt Peak	Spacewatch	·	3.0 km	MPC · JPL
428425	2007 TE_{197}	—	October 8, 2007	Kitt Peak	Spacewatch	·	2.4 km	MPC · JPL
428426	2007 TV_{199}	—	October 8, 2007	Kitt Peak	Spacewatch	·	2.3 km	MPC · JPL
428427	2007 TD_{203}	—	October 8, 2007	Mount Lemmon	Mount Lemmon Survey	·	2.7 km	MPC · JPL
428428	2007 TD_{206}	—	September 12, 2007	Mount Lemmon	Mount Lemmon Survey	·	810 m	MPC · JPL
428429	2007 TZ_{210}	—	September 10, 2007	Catalina	CSS	·	3.0 km	MPC · JPL
428430	2007 TE_{214}	—	October 7, 2007	Kitt Peak	Spacewatch	·	3.6 km	MPC · JPL
428431	2007 TA_{226}	—	October 8, 2007	Kitt Peak	Spacewatch	LIX	4.5 km	MPC · JPL
428432	2007 TN_{231}	—	October 8, 2007	Mount Lemmon	Mount Lemmon Survey	(159)	2.3 km	MPC · JPL
428433	2007 TV_{233}	—	October 8, 2007	Kitt Peak	Spacewatch	·	2.8 km	MPC · JPL
428434	2007 TL_{250}	—	October 11, 2007	Mount Lemmon	Mount Lemmon Survey	EOS	2.2 km	MPC · JPL
428435	2007 TW_{253}	—	October 8, 2007	Mount Lemmon	Mount Lemmon Survey	EOS	1.8 km	MPC · JPL
428436	2007 TN_{267}	—	September 25, 2007	Mount Lemmon	Mount Lemmon Survey	EOS	2.1 km	MPC · JPL
428437	2007 TE_{273}	—	October 10, 2007	Kitt Peak	Spacewatch	EOS	1.9 km	MPC · JPL
428438	2007 TY_{274}	—	September 14, 2007	Mount Lemmon	Mount Lemmon Survey	·	2.5 km	MPC · JPL
428439	2007 TL_{275}	—	October 11, 2007	Catalina	CSS	EOS	2.1 km	MPC · JPL
428440	2007 TK_{317}	—	October 12, 2007	Kitt Peak	Spacewatch	·	2.5 km	MPC · JPL
428441	2007 TY_{317}	—	September 18, 2007	Mount Lemmon	Mount Lemmon Survey	·	2.9 km	MPC · JPL
428442	2007 TE_{322}	—	October 10, 2007	Lulin	LUSS	·	680 m	MPC · JPL
428443	2007 TP_{325}	—	October 11, 2007	Kitt Peak	Spacewatch	·	500 m	MPC · JPL
428444	2007 TV_{361}	—	October 14, 2007	Mount Lemmon	Mount Lemmon Survey	·	2.8 km	MPC · JPL
428445	2007 TL_{377}	—	October 5, 2007	Kitt Peak	Spacewatch	EOS	1.9 km	MPC · JPL
428446	2007 TJ_{381}	—	October 14, 2007	Kitt Peak	Spacewatch	·	2.2 km	MPC · JPL
428447	2007 TF_{384}	—	October 14, 2007	Mount Lemmon	Mount Lemmon Survey	·	2.9 km	MPC · JPL
428448	2007 TF_{387}	—	October 13, 2007	Kitt Peak	Spacewatch	(43176)	3.3 km	MPC · JPL
428449	2007 TH_{388}	—	September 13, 2007	Kitt Peak	Spacewatch	·	1.6 km	MPC · JPL
428450	2007 TM_{390}	—	October 14, 2007	Mount Lemmon	Mount Lemmon Survey	·	2.1 km	MPC · JPL
428451	2007 TJ_{407}	—	October 15, 2007	Mount Lemmon	Mount Lemmon Survey	EOS	1.7 km	MPC · JPL
428452	2007 TL_{421}	—	October 11, 2007	Catalina	CSS	·	3.3 km	MPC · JPL
428453	2007 TY_{425}	—	October 9, 2007	Kitt Peak	Spacewatch	·	2.7 km	MPC · JPL
428454	2007 TD_{426}	—	October 9, 2007	Mount Lemmon	Mount Lemmon Survey	·	3.6 km	MPC · JPL
428455	2007 TY_{432}	—	October 8, 2007	Catalina	CSS	·	2.9 km	MPC · JPL
428456	2007 TK_{443}	—	October 7, 2007	Catalina	CSS	·	2.2 km	MPC · JPL
428457	2007 TL_{445}	—	March 30, 2004	Kitt Peak	Spacewatch	·	3.7 km	MPC · JPL
428458	2007 TB_{448}	—	October 15, 2007	Kitt Peak	Spacewatch	·	3.3 km	MPC · JPL
428459	2007 TJ_{451}	—	October 15, 2007	Mount Lemmon	Mount Lemmon Survey	·	3.2 km	MPC · JPL
428460	2007 TZ_{451}	—	October 13, 2007	Catalina	CSS	·	3.7 km	MPC · JPL
428461	2007 US_{1}	—	October 11, 2007	Catalina	CSS	·	2.5 km	MPC · JPL
428462	2007 UA_{26}	—	October 16, 2007	Kitt Peak	Spacewatch	·	3.3 km	MPC · JPL
428463	2007 UA_{42}	—	October 16, 2007	Mount Lemmon	Mount Lemmon Survey	EOS	2.0 km	MPC · JPL
428464	2007 UE_{46}	—	September 25, 2007	Mount Lemmon	Mount Lemmon Survey	HYG	2.7 km	MPC · JPL
428465	2007 UB_{67}	—	October 30, 2007	Kitt Peak	Spacewatch	·	3.1 km	MPC · JPL
428466	2007 UY_{75}	—	October 11, 2007	Kitt Peak	Spacewatch	·	800 m	MPC · JPL
428467	2007 UA_{76}	—	October 15, 2007	Kitt Peak	Spacewatch	·	2.9 km	MPC · JPL
428468	2007 UU_{86}	—	October 30, 2007	Kitt Peak	Spacewatch	·	3.4 km	MPC · JPL
428469	2007 UQ_{91}	—	October 30, 2007	Mount Lemmon	Mount Lemmon Survey	·	2.7 km	MPC · JPL
428470	2007 UG_{96}	—	October 30, 2007	Kitt Peak	Spacewatch	·	630 m	MPC · JPL
428471	2007 UN_{108}	—	October 30, 2007	Kitt Peak	Spacewatch	·	3.1 km	MPC · JPL
428472	2007 UT_{120}	—	September 25, 2007	Mount Lemmon	Mount Lemmon Survey	·	2.6 km	MPC · JPL
428473	2007 VM_{24}	—	November 2, 2007	Mount Lemmon	Mount Lemmon Survey	·	2.9 km	MPC · JPL
428474	2007 VT_{31}	—	October 9, 2007	Kitt Peak	Spacewatch	·	490 m	MPC · JPL
428475	2007 VC_{47}	—	November 1, 2007	Kitt Peak	Spacewatch	EMA	4.5 km	MPC · JPL
428476	2007 VZ_{52}	—	November 1, 2007	Kitt Peak	Spacewatch	EOS	2.0 km	MPC · JPL
428477	2007 VO_{58}	—	November 1, 2007	Kitt Peak	Spacewatch	·	590 m	MPC · JPL
428478	2007 VZ_{64}	—	November 1, 2007	Kitt Peak	Spacewatch	·	610 m	MPC · JPL
428479	2007 VC_{76}	—	November 3, 2007	Kitt Peak	Spacewatch	EOS	1.8 km	MPC · JPL
428480	2007 VE_{99}	—	October 13, 2007	Kitt Peak	Spacewatch	·	3.1 km	MPC · JPL
428481	2007 VK_{100}	—	November 2, 2007	Kitt Peak	Spacewatch	·	6.9 km	MPC · JPL
428482	2007 VR_{100}	—	November 2, 2007	Kitt Peak	Spacewatch	·	660 m	MPC · JPL
428483	2007 VX_{121}	—	October 9, 2007	Kitt Peak	Spacewatch	·	2.8 km	MPC · JPL
428484	2007 VS_{125}	—	November 7, 2007	Bisei SG Center	BATTeRS	·	680 m	MPC · JPL
428485	2007 VO_{133}	—	November 2, 2007	Catalina	CSS	·	3.0 km	MPC · JPL
428486	2007 VK_{149}	—	November 7, 2007	Catalina	CSS	·	730 m	MPC · JPL
428487	2007 VW_{163}	—	October 16, 2007	Mount Lemmon	Mount Lemmon Survey	·	2.8 km	MPC · JPL
428488	2007 VD_{172}	—	September 18, 2007	Kitt Peak	Spacewatch	·	2.2 km	MPC · JPL
428489	2007 VC_{188}	—	October 15, 2007	Kitt Peak	Spacewatch	·	3.7 km	MPC · JPL
428490	2007 VZ_{203}	—	November 9, 2007	Kitt Peak	Spacewatch	·	3.2 km	MPC · JPL
428491	2007 VG_{204}	—	November 9, 2007	Kitt Peak	Spacewatch	·	660 m	MPC · JPL
428492	2007 VP_{218}	—	November 9, 2007	Kitt Peak	Spacewatch	·	560 m	MPC · JPL
428493	2007 VA_{241}	—	November 11, 2007	Catalina	CSS	T_{j} (2.97)	4.4 km	MPC · JPL
428494	2007 VM_{272}	—	November 11, 2007	Catalina	CSS	·	2.9 km	MPC · JPL
428495	2007 VW_{273}	—	November 12, 2007	Mount Lemmon	Mount Lemmon Survey	·	4.6 km	MPC · JPL
428496	2007 VF_{319}	—	November 3, 2007	Kitt Peak	Spacewatch	·	2.8 km	MPC · JPL
428497	2007 VD_{325}	—	November 1, 2007	Kitt Peak	Spacewatch	·	760 m	MPC · JPL
428498	2007 VO_{330}	—	November 3, 2007	Kitt Peak	Spacewatch	·	650 m	MPC · JPL
428499	2007 WZ_{3}	—	November 17, 2007	Vicques	M. Ory	·	3.9 km	MPC · JPL
428500	2007 WZ_{12}	—	November 18, 2007	Mount Lemmon	Mount Lemmon Survey	·	2.9 km	MPC · JPL

== 428501–428600 ==
back to top

Designation			Discovery			Properties		Ref
Permanent	Provisional	Named after	Date	Site	Discoverer(s)	Category	Diam.	Ref
428501	2007 WP_{24}	—	November 18, 2007	Mount Lemmon	Mount Lemmon Survey	·	2.8 km	MPC · JPL
428502	2007 WN_{31}	—	November 19, 2007	Mount Lemmon	Mount Lemmon Survey	·	2.4 km	MPC · JPL
428503	2007 WQ_{34}	—	October 24, 1995	Kitt Peak	Spacewatch	·	2.7 km	MPC · JPL
428504	2007 XS_{22}	—	December 10, 2007	Socorro	LINEAR	(2076)	1.0 km	MPC · JPL
428505	2007 XW_{24}	—	December 5, 2007	Mount Lemmon	Mount Lemmon Survey	·	3.5 km	MPC · JPL
428506	2007 XU_{52}	—	December 5, 2007	Mount Lemmon	Mount Lemmon Survey	·	790 m	MPC · JPL
428507	2007 XQ_{56}	—	December 16, 2007	Catalina	CSS	·	680 m	MPC · JPL
428508	2007 YE_{15}	—	December 16, 2007	Kitt Peak	Spacewatch	·	3.7 km	MPC · JPL
428509	2007 YP_{18}	—	December 4, 2007	Kitt Peak	Spacewatch	·	820 m	MPC · JPL
428510	2007 YH_{21}	—	December 16, 2007	Kitt Peak	Spacewatch	(260) · CYB	3.4 km	MPC · JPL
428511	2007 YK_{21}	—	December 16, 2007	Kitt Peak	Spacewatch	·	4.0 km	MPC · JPL
428512	2007 YN_{41}	—	December 30, 2007	Kitt Peak	Spacewatch	·	600 m	MPC · JPL
428513	2007 YL_{51}	—	December 6, 2007	Kitt Peak	Spacewatch	·	3.4 km	MPC · JPL
428514	2007 YO_{62}	—	December 30, 2007	Mount Lemmon	Mount Lemmon Survey	MAS	560 m	MPC · JPL
428515	2007 YT_{63}	—	December 31, 2007	Kitt Peak	Spacewatch	·	470 m	MPC · JPL
428516	2007 YV_{64}	—	November 11, 2007	Mount Lemmon	Mount Lemmon Survey	·	890 m	MPC · JPL
428517	2007 YW_{69}	—	December 31, 2007	Kitt Peak	Spacewatch	·	690 m	MPC · JPL
428518	2008 AR_{7}	—	January 10, 2008	Kitt Peak	Spacewatch	·	750 m	MPC · JPL
428519	2008 AQ_{8}	—	January 10, 2008	Kitt Peak	Spacewatch	·	530 m	MPC · JPL
428520	2008 AS_{21}	—	January 10, 2008	Mount Lemmon	Mount Lemmon Survey	·	680 m	MPC · JPL
428521	2008 AA_{27}	—	January 10, 2008	Kitt Peak	Spacewatch	·	940 m	MPC · JPL
428522	2008 AQ_{38}	—	January 10, 2008	Mount Lemmon	Mount Lemmon Survey	·	720 m	MPC · JPL
428523	2008 AO_{43}	—	January 10, 2008	Kitt Peak	Spacewatch	·	640 m	MPC · JPL
428524	2008 AG_{74}	—	January 10, 2008	Kitt Peak	Spacewatch	·	680 m	MPC · JPL
428525	2008 AD_{77}	—	January 12, 2008	Kitt Peak	Spacewatch	·	830 m	MPC · JPL
428526	2008 AD_{80}	—	January 12, 2008	Kitt Peak	Spacewatch	·	720 m	MPC · JPL
428527	2008 AW_{82}	—	January 15, 2008	Mount Lemmon	Mount Lemmon Survey	MAS	780 m	MPC · JPL
428528	2008 AJ_{89}	—	January 13, 2008	Kitt Peak	Spacewatch	·	3.4 km	MPC · JPL
428529	2008 AO_{93}	—	December 31, 2007	Kitt Peak	Spacewatch	·	3.3 km	MPC · JPL
428530	2008 AB_{98}	—	December 31, 2007	Mount Lemmon	Mount Lemmon Survey	·	810 m	MPC · JPL
428531	2008 AE_{103}	—	November 12, 2007	Mount Lemmon	Mount Lemmon Survey	·	660 m	MPC · JPL
428532	2008 AX_{109}	—	January 15, 2008	Kitt Peak	Spacewatch	·	680 m	MPC · JPL
428533	2008 AF_{111}	—	December 30, 2007	Mount Lemmon	Mount Lemmon Survey	·	640 m	MPC · JPL
428534	2008 AK_{127}	—	January 10, 2008	Mount Lemmon	Mount Lemmon Survey	·	3.6 km	MPC · JPL
428535	2008 BW_{3}	—	December 14, 2007	Mount Lemmon	Mount Lemmon Survey	·	650 m	MPC · JPL
428536	2008 BK_{16}	—	December 30, 2007	Kitt Peak	Spacewatch	·	740 m	MPC · JPL
428537	2008 BY_{20}	—	January 30, 2008	Mount Lemmon	Mount Lemmon Survey	·	670 m	MPC · JPL
428538	2008 BF_{32}	—	January 30, 2008	Mount Lemmon	Mount Lemmon Survey	·	580 m	MPC · JPL
428539	2008 BF_{49}	—	January 20, 2008	Mount Lemmon	Mount Lemmon Survey	·	780 m	MPC · JPL
428540	2008 CN_{7}	—	November 19, 2007	Mount Lemmon	Mount Lemmon Survey	CYB	4.1 km	MPC · JPL
428541	2008 CT_{16}	—	January 30, 2008	Kitt Peak	Spacewatch	·	750 m	MPC · JPL
428542	2008 CW_{16}	—	February 3, 2008	Kitt Peak	Spacewatch	V	630 m	MPC · JPL
428543	2008 CC_{19}	—	February 3, 2008	Kitt Peak	Spacewatch	·	830 m	MPC · JPL
428544	2008 CM_{24}	—	January 20, 2008	Mount Lemmon	Mount Lemmon Survey	·	950 m	MPC · JPL
428545	2008 CL_{36}	—	February 2, 2008	Kitt Peak	Spacewatch	·	630 m	MPC · JPL
428546	2008 CG_{37}	—	February 2, 2008	Kitt Peak	Spacewatch	·	940 m	MPC · JPL
428547	2008 CF_{41}	—	December 31, 2007	Mount Lemmon	Mount Lemmon Survey	·	1.3 km	MPC · JPL
428548	2008 CY_{43}	—	February 2, 2008	Kitt Peak	Spacewatch	·	940 m	MPC · JPL
428549	2008 CA_{60}	—	February 7, 2008	Kitt Peak	Spacewatch	·	660 m	MPC · JPL
428550	2008 CP_{64}	—	December 20, 2007	Mount Lemmon	Mount Lemmon Survey	·	640 m	MPC · JPL
428551	2008 CQ_{64}	—	February 8, 2008	Mount Lemmon	Mount Lemmon Survey	·	640 m	MPC · JPL
428552	2008 CV_{66}	—	February 8, 2008	Mount Lemmon	Mount Lemmon Survey	·	590 m	MPC · JPL
428553	2008 CF_{73}	—	January 16, 2008	Mount Lemmon	Mount Lemmon Survey	·	610 m	MPC · JPL
428554	2008 CM_{73}	—	February 6, 2008	Catalina	CSS	·	710 m	MPC · JPL
428555	2008 CR_{74}	—	January 18, 2008	Mount Lemmon	Mount Lemmon Survey	(2076)	690 m	MPC · JPL
428556	2008 CE_{75}	—	February 10, 2008	Marly	P. Kocher	·	940 m	MPC · JPL
428557	2008 CS_{109}	—	February 9, 2008	Kitt Peak	Spacewatch	·	710 m	MPC · JPL
428558	2008 CJ_{115}	—	January 13, 2008	Kitt Peak	Spacewatch	VER	3.8 km	MPC · JPL
428559	2008 CP_{115}	—	January 13, 2008	Kitt Peak	Spacewatch	·	740 m	MPC · JPL
428560	2008 CQ_{128}	—	February 8, 2008	Kitt Peak	Spacewatch	·	530 m	MPC · JPL
428561	2008 CJ_{132}	—	January 30, 2008	Mount Lemmon	Mount Lemmon Survey	·	960 m	MPC · JPL
428562	2008 CB_{143}	—	February 8, 2008	Kitt Peak	Spacewatch	·	730 m	MPC · JPL
428563	2008 CE_{145}	—	February 9, 2008	Kitt Peak	Spacewatch	·	940 m	MPC · JPL
428564	2008 CJ_{152}	—	February 2, 2008	Kitt Peak	Spacewatch	·	1.1 km	MPC · JPL
428565	2008 CT_{153}	—	February 9, 2008	Kitt Peak	Spacewatch	·	740 m	MPC · JPL
428566	2008 CP_{156}	—	February 9, 2008	Kitt Peak	Spacewatch	·	910 m	MPC · JPL
428567	2008 CP_{158}	—	February 2, 2008	Kitt Peak	Spacewatch	V	500 m	MPC · JPL
428568	2008 CQ_{165}	—	February 10, 2008	Kitt Peak	Spacewatch	PHO	1.1 km	MPC · JPL
428569	2008 CA_{166}	—	February 10, 2008	Mount Lemmon	Mount Lemmon Survey	ERI	1.2 km	MPC · JPL
428570	2008 CG_{197}	—	February 8, 2008	Kitt Peak	Spacewatch	·	680 m	MPC · JPL
428571	2008 DF_{6}	—	February 24, 2008	Kitt Peak	Spacewatch	·	770 m	MPC · JPL
428572	2008 DZ_{11}	—	January 11, 2008	Kitt Peak	Spacewatch	·	920 m	MPC · JPL
428573	2008 DE_{20}	—	February 28, 2008	Mount Lemmon	Mount Lemmon Survey	·	700 m	MPC · JPL
428574	2008 DE_{23}	—	January 31, 2008	Catalina	CSS	·	1.1 km	MPC · JPL
428575	2008 DU_{23}	—	February 26, 2008	Mount Lemmon	Mount Lemmon Survey	PHO	2.4 km	MPC · JPL
428576	2008 DM_{24}	—	February 28, 2008	Mount Lemmon	Mount Lemmon Survey	·	840 m	MPC · JPL
428577	2008 DA_{30}	—	February 26, 2008	Mount Lemmon	Mount Lemmon Survey	·	740 m	MPC · JPL
428578	2008 DW_{86}	—	February 8, 2008	Kitt Peak	Spacewatch	·	810 m	MPC · JPL
428579	2008 DE_{87}	—	February 27, 2008	Mount Lemmon	Mount Lemmon Survey	·	960 m	MPC · JPL
428580	2008 DG_{87}	—	February 28, 2008	Mount Lemmon	Mount Lemmon Survey	V	560 m	MPC · JPL
428581	2008 DD_{88}	—	February 18, 2008	Mount Lemmon	Mount Lemmon Survey	·	710 m	MPC · JPL
428582	2008 EH_{9}	—	March 9, 2008	Catalina	CSS	PHO	1.5 km	MPC · JPL
428583	2008 EE_{10}	—	March 1, 2008	Kitt Peak	Spacewatch	·	650 m	MPC · JPL
428584	2008 EP_{12}	—	March 1, 2008	Kitt Peak	Spacewatch	NYS	970 m	MPC · JPL
428585	2008 ED_{17}	—	March 1, 2008	Kitt Peak	Spacewatch	·	860 m	MPC · JPL
428586	2008 ET_{20}	—	March 2, 2008	Kitt Peak	Spacewatch	·	980 m	MPC · JPL
428587	2008 EA_{26}	—	January 30, 2008	Mount Lemmon	Mount Lemmon Survey	·	720 m	MPC · JPL
428588	2008 EZ_{30}	—	February 12, 2008	Mount Lemmon	Mount Lemmon Survey	·	780 m	MPC · JPL
428589	2008 EP_{40}	—	March 4, 2008	Kitt Peak	Spacewatch	·	910 m	MPC · JPL
428590	2008 EZ_{48}	—	March 6, 2008	Kitt Peak	Spacewatch	·	650 m	MPC · JPL
428591	2008 EO_{52}	—	March 6, 2008	Kitt Peak	Spacewatch	·	720 m	MPC · JPL
428592	2008 EY_{52}	—	March 6, 2008	Mount Lemmon	Mount Lemmon Survey	·	980 m	MPC · JPL
428593	2008 EE_{54}	—	March 6, 2008	Mount Lemmon	Mount Lemmon Survey	·	1.0 km	MPC · JPL
428594	2008 EY_{56}	—	March 7, 2008	Catalina	CSS	·	870 m	MPC · JPL
428595	2008 EG_{57}	—	March 7, 2008	Catalina	CSS	·	930 m	MPC · JPL
428596	2008 EN_{59}	—	March 8, 2008	Mount Lemmon	Mount Lemmon Survey	·	950 m	MPC · JPL
428597	2008 EX_{70}	—	February 7, 2008	Kitt Peak	Spacewatch	·	820 m	MPC · JPL
428598	2008 EF_{73}	—	March 7, 2008	Kitt Peak	Spacewatch	·	990 m	MPC · JPL
428599	2008 EE_{74}	—	February 28, 2008	Kitt Peak	Spacewatch	·	1.1 km	MPC · JPL
428600	2008 EK_{77}	—	March 7, 2008	Kitt Peak	Spacewatch	·	1.0 km	MPC · JPL

== 428601–428700 ==
back to top

Designation			Discovery			Properties		Ref
Permanent	Provisional	Named after	Date	Site	Discoverer(s)	Category	Diam.	Ref
428601	2008 ET_{92}	—	November 7, 2007	Mount Lemmon	Mount Lemmon Survey	·	1.2 km	MPC · JPL
428602	2008 EP_{94}	—	March 5, 2008	Mount Lemmon	Mount Lemmon Survey	·	640 m	MPC · JPL
428603	2008 ED_{123}	—	March 9, 2008	Kitt Peak	Spacewatch	·	1.0 km	MPC · JPL
428604	2008 ED_{124}	—	February 10, 2008	Mount Lemmon	Mount Lemmon Survey	(2076)	890 m	MPC · JPL
428605	2008 EX_{128}	—	March 11, 2008	Kitt Peak	Spacewatch	·	880 m	MPC · JPL
428606	2008 EV_{137}	—	March 11, 2008	Kitt Peak	Spacewatch	NYS	840 m	MPC · JPL
428607	2008 EN_{143}	—	March 14, 2008	Catalina	CSS	·	880 m	MPC · JPL
428608	2008 EK_{148}	—	February 10, 2008	Mount Lemmon	Mount Lemmon Survey	·	930 m	MPC · JPL
428609	2008 EY_{148}	—	March 2, 2008	Kitt Peak	Spacewatch	V	650 m	MPC · JPL
428610	2008 EV_{149}	—	March 5, 2008	Kitt Peak	Spacewatch	NYS	920 m	MPC · JPL
428611	2008 EW_{149}	—	March 5, 2008	Kitt Peak	Spacewatch	NYS	1.0 km	MPC · JPL
428612	2008 ER_{150}	—	March 3, 2008	Kitt Peak	Spacewatch	·	1.0 km	MPC · JPL
428613	2008 EK_{160}	—	March 4, 2008	Kitt Peak	Spacewatch	·	1.0 km	MPC · JPL
428614	2008 EX_{162}	—	March 15, 2008	Kitt Peak	Spacewatch	V	520 m	MPC · JPL
428615	2008 FL_{4}	—	March 25, 2008	Kitt Peak	Spacewatch	·	1.2 km	MPC · JPL
428616	2008 FN_{5}	—	March 28, 2008	Grove Creek	Tozzi, F.	PHO	1.3 km	MPC · JPL
428617	2008 FQ_{10}	—	March 26, 2008	Kitt Peak	Spacewatch	·	900 m	MPC · JPL
428618	2008 FA_{15}	—	March 26, 2008	Kitt Peak	Spacewatch	·	1.1 km	MPC · JPL
428619	2008 FC_{33}	—	March 28, 2008	Mount Lemmon	Mount Lemmon Survey	·	810 m	MPC · JPL
428620	2008 FD_{38}	—	March 28, 2008	Kitt Peak	Spacewatch	·	800 m	MPC · JPL
428621	2008 FL_{46}	—	March 28, 2008	Mount Lemmon	Mount Lemmon Survey	·	720 m	MPC · JPL
428622	2008 FS_{48}	—	March 5, 2008	Kitt Peak	Spacewatch	3:2	6.6 km	MPC · JPL
428623	2008 FC_{50}	—	March 28, 2008	Kitt Peak	Spacewatch	·	1.1 km	MPC · JPL
428624	2008 FA_{51}	—	March 28, 2008	Mount Lemmon	Mount Lemmon Survey	·	1.2 km	MPC · JPL
428625	2008 FO_{55}	—	March 28, 2008	Mount Lemmon	Mount Lemmon Survey	·	1.1 km	MPC · JPL
428626	2008 FH_{59}	—	March 29, 2008	Catalina	CSS	(2076)	850 m	MPC · JPL
428627	2008 FO_{62}	—	March 27, 2008	Kitt Peak	Spacewatch	·	1.1 km	MPC · JPL
428628	2008 FG_{63}	—	November 16, 1995	Kitt Peak	Spacewatch	PHO	750 m	MPC · JPL
428629	2008 FD_{68}	—	March 28, 2008	Mount Lemmon	Mount Lemmon Survey	·	1.1 km	MPC · JPL
428630	2008 FZ_{68}	—	March 28, 2008	Mount Lemmon	Mount Lemmon Survey	·	780 m	MPC · JPL
428631	2008 FB_{79}	—	March 27, 2008	Mount Lemmon	Mount Lemmon Survey	MAS	620 m	MPC · JPL
428632	2008 FH_{81}	—	March 11, 2008	Kitt Peak	Spacewatch	·	610 m	MPC · JPL
428633	2008 FQ_{87}	—	March 28, 2008	Mount Lemmon	Mount Lemmon Survey	·	840 m	MPC · JPL
428634	2008 FZ_{90}	—	March 29, 2008	Mount Lemmon	Mount Lemmon Survey	·	950 m	MPC · JPL
428635	2008 FT_{99}	—	December 13, 2006	Kitt Peak	Spacewatch	·	1.7 km	MPC · JPL
428636	2008 FN_{113}	—	March 31, 2008	Kitt Peak	Spacewatch	MAS	730 m	MPC · JPL
428637	2008 FB_{121}	—	March 31, 2008	Mount Lemmon	Mount Lemmon Survey	V	680 m	MPC · JPL
428638	2008 FU_{127}	—	March 27, 2008	Kitt Peak	Spacewatch	NYS	1.2 km	MPC · JPL
428639	2008 FN_{128}	—	March 28, 2008	Mount Lemmon	Mount Lemmon Survey	·	780 m	MPC · JPL
428640	2008 FG_{129}	—	March 29, 2008	Kitt Peak	Spacewatch	·	1.2 km	MPC · JPL
428641	2008 FC_{135}	—	March 31, 2008	Kitt Peak	Spacewatch	NYS	980 m	MPC · JPL
428642	2008 GJ_{3}	—	March 13, 2008	Catalina	CSS	PHO	930 m	MPC · JPL
428643	2008 GL_{4}	—	April 1, 2008	Kitt Peak	Spacewatch	NYS	1.2 km	MPC · JPL
428644	2008 GW_{5}	—	March 10, 2008	Mount Lemmon	Mount Lemmon Survey	·	1.5 km	MPC · JPL
428645	2008 GD_{7}	—	April 1, 2008	Kitt Peak	Spacewatch	·	900 m	MPC · JPL
428646	2008 GR_{9}	—	April 1, 2008	Kitt Peak	Spacewatch	MAS	650 m	MPC · JPL
428647	2008 GH_{10}	—	April 1, 2008	Kitt Peak	Spacewatch	MAS	610 m	MPC · JPL
428648	2008 GJ_{23}	—	March 12, 2008	Kitt Peak	Spacewatch	V	520 m	MPC · JPL
428649	2008 GR_{30}	—	April 3, 2008	Mount Lemmon	Mount Lemmon Survey	MAS	650 m	MPC · JPL
428650	2008 GW_{35}	—	April 3, 2008	Mount Lemmon	Mount Lemmon Survey	·	1.0 km	MPC · JPL
428651	2008 GK_{43}	—	April 4, 2008	Mount Lemmon	Mount Lemmon Survey	·	1.3 km	MPC · JPL
428652	2008 GW_{46}	—	April 4, 2008	Kitt Peak	Spacewatch	·	920 m	MPC · JPL
428653	2008 GO_{50}	—	April 5, 2008	Mount Lemmon	Mount Lemmon Survey	·	860 m	MPC · JPL
428654	2008 GE_{53}	—	April 5, 2008	Mount Lemmon	Mount Lemmon Survey	·	970 m	MPC · JPL
428655	2008 GR_{55}	—	April 5, 2008	Mount Lemmon	Mount Lemmon Survey	·	1.1 km	MPC · JPL
428656	2008 GD_{72}	—	April 7, 2008	Mount Lemmon	Mount Lemmon Survey	MAS	650 m	MPC · JPL
428657	2008 GB_{78}	—	April 7, 2008	Kitt Peak	Spacewatch	·	670 m	MPC · JPL
428658	2008 GJ_{82}	—	March 28, 2008	Kitt Peak	Spacewatch	·	1.2 km	MPC · JPL
428659	2008 GM_{83}	—	April 8, 2008	Kitt Peak	Spacewatch	·	750 m	MPC · JPL
428660	2008 GP_{91}	—	April 6, 2008	Mount Lemmon	Mount Lemmon Survey	V	650 m	MPC · JPL
428661	2008 GJ_{92}	—	April 6, 2008	Mount Lemmon	Mount Lemmon Survey	NYS	1.1 km	MPC · JPL
428662	2008 GF_{96}	—	March 28, 2008	Kitt Peak	Spacewatch	·	1.0 km	MPC · JPL
428663	2008 GU_{99}	—	April 9, 2008	Kitt Peak	Spacewatch	NYS	1.2 km	MPC · JPL
428664	2008 GV_{99}	—	April 9, 2008	Kitt Peak	Spacewatch	PHO	760 m	MPC · JPL
428665	2008 GS_{107}	—	March 10, 2008	Mount Lemmon	Mount Lemmon Survey	·	1.0 km	MPC · JPL
428666	2008 GZ_{113}	—	April 9, 2008	Kitt Peak	Spacewatch	NYS	830 m	MPC · JPL
428667	2008 GN_{115}	—	March 10, 2008	Kitt Peak	Spacewatch	·	940 m	MPC · JPL
428668	2008 GA_{121}	—	April 13, 2008	Kitt Peak	Spacewatch	NYS	1.2 km	MPC · JPL
428669	2008 GA_{123}	—	October 31, 2006	Mount Lemmon	Mount Lemmon Survey	MAS	590 m	MPC · JPL
428670	2008 GE_{145}	—	April 5, 2008	Catalina	CSS	·	1.3 km	MPC · JPL
428671	2008 GM_{146}	—	April 15, 2008	Mount Lemmon	Mount Lemmon Survey	·	1.2 km	MPC · JPL
428672	2008 HV_{8}	—	April 24, 2008	Kitt Peak	Spacewatch	·	1.1 km	MPC · JPL
428673	2008 HE_{10}	—	January 30, 2004	Kitt Peak	Spacewatch	MAS	640 m	MPC · JPL
428674	2008 HB_{11}	—	April 24, 2008	Kitt Peak	Spacewatch	·	1.0 km	MPC · JPL
428675	2008 HL_{11}	—	April 24, 2008	Kitt Peak	Spacewatch	·	1.1 km	MPC · JPL
428676	2008 HM_{12}	—	April 24, 2008	Kitt Peak	Spacewatch	V	790 m	MPC · JPL
428677	2008 HV_{15}	—	April 3, 2008	Mount Lemmon	Mount Lemmon Survey	·	1.0 km	MPC · JPL
428678	2008 HV_{54}	—	April 29, 2008	Kitt Peak	Spacewatch	·	1.6 km	MPC · JPL
428679	2008 HQ_{55}	—	April 29, 2008	Kitt Peak	Spacewatch	·	920 m	MPC · JPL
428680	2008 HR_{70}	—	May 14, 2008	Mount Lemmon	Mount Lemmon Survey	ERI	1.5 km	MPC · JPL
428681	2008 JA_{8}	—	May 5, 2008	Siding Spring	SSS	AMO +1km	930 m	MPC · JPL
428682	2008 JV_{29}	—	May 11, 2008	Kitt Peak	Spacewatch	NYS	920 m	MPC · JPL
428683	2008 KQ_{20}	—	May 13, 2008	Mount Lemmon	Mount Lemmon Survey	·	1.6 km	MPC · JPL
428684	2008 KP_{33}	—	May 5, 2008	Kitt Peak	Spacewatch	·	1.3 km	MPC · JPL
428685	2008 KZ_{36}	—	May 3, 2008	Mount Lemmon	Mount Lemmon Survey	MAR	930 m	MPC · JPL
428686	2008 KT_{38}	—	May 30, 2008	Kitt Peak	Spacewatch	·	1.2 km	MPC · JPL
428687	2008 KC_{41}	—	April 15, 2008	Mount Lemmon	Mount Lemmon Survey	·	1.4 km	MPC · JPL
428688	2008 LR_{9}	—	May 8, 2008	Mount Lemmon	Mount Lemmon Survey	·	1.3 km	MPC · JPL
428689	2008 LE_{15}	—	May 31, 2008	Mount Lemmon	Mount Lemmon Survey	·	990 m	MPC · JPL
428690	2008 LH_{17}	—	June 10, 2008	Kitt Peak	Spacewatch	·	900 m	MPC · JPL
428691	2008 MD_{5}	—	June 29, 2008	Siding Spring	SSS	·	1.5 km	MPC · JPL
428692	2008 NN_{3}	—	May 30, 2008	Mount Lemmon	Mount Lemmon Survey	·	1.4 km	MPC · JPL
428693	2008 OZ_{4}	—	July 28, 2008	Mount Lemmon	Mount Lemmon Survey	MAR	1.3 km	MPC · JPL
428694 Saulė	2008 OS_{9}	Saulė	July 29, 2008	Baldone	K. Černis, I. Eglītis	APO	490 m	MPC · JPL
428695	2008 ON_{18}	—	July 28, 2008	Siding Spring	SSS	BRA	2.0 km	MPC · JPL
428696	2008 PM_{6}	—	August 2, 2008	Eygalayes	Sogorb, P.	·	2.0 km	MPC · JPL
428697	2008 PE_{19}	—	August 7, 2008	Kitt Peak	Spacewatch	EUN	1.1 km	MPC · JPL
428698	2008 QG_{1}	—	August 23, 2008	La Sagra	OAM	·	1.6 km	MPC · JPL
428699	2008 QG_{2}	—	August 24, 2008	La Sagra	OAM	·	2.4 km	MPC · JPL
428700	2008 QM_{19}	—	August 3, 2008	Siding Spring	SSS	·	2.2 km	MPC · JPL

== 428701–428800 ==
back to top

Designation			Discovery			Properties		Ref
Permanent	Provisional	Named after	Date	Site	Discoverer(s)	Category	Diam.	Ref
428701	2008 QU_{24}	—	August 30, 2008	La Sagra	OAM	·	2.3 km	MPC · JPL
428702	2008 QL_{38}	—	August 23, 2008	Siding Spring	SSS	H	580 m	MPC · JPL
428703	2008 QY_{38}	—	August 24, 2008	Kitt Peak	Spacewatch	GEF	1.4 km	MPC · JPL
428704	2008 QT_{42}	—	August 24, 2008	Kitt Peak	Spacewatch	·	1.6 km	MPC · JPL
428705	2008 QT_{44}	—	August 23, 2008	Socorro	LINEAR	·	2.1 km	MPC · JPL
428706	2008 QP_{45}	—	January 31, 2006	Catalina	CSS	·	2.8 km	MPC · JPL
428707	2008 QZ_{45}	—	August 26, 2008	Črni Vrh	Zakrajšek, J.	EUN	1.6 km	MPC · JPL
428708	2008 RR_{2}	—	September 2, 2008	Kitt Peak	Spacewatch	·	1.7 km	MPC · JPL
428709	2008 RO_{21}	—	September 4, 2008	Kitt Peak	Spacewatch	·	2.5 km	MPC · JPL
428710	2008 RN_{24}	—	September 5, 2008	Socorro	LINEAR	·	3.7 km	MPC · JPL
428711	2008 RR_{25}	—	September 5, 2008	Needville	J. Dellinger, Sexton, C.	·	2.0 km	MPC · JPL
428712	2008 RB_{26}	—	September 7, 2008	Dauban	Kugel, F.	·	2.2 km	MPC · JPL
428713	2008 RT_{32}	—	September 2, 2008	Kitt Peak	Spacewatch	·	1.6 km	MPC · JPL
428714	2008 RE_{34}	—	September 2, 2008	Kitt Peak	Spacewatch	AGN	980 m	MPC · JPL
428715	2008 RG_{38}	—	September 2, 2008	Kitt Peak	Spacewatch	KOR	1.1 km	MPC · JPL
428716	2008 RN_{40}	—	September 2, 2008	Kitt Peak	Spacewatch	HOF	2.2 km	MPC · JPL
428717	2008 RO_{40}	—	September 2, 2008	Kitt Peak	Spacewatch	WIT	1.2 km	MPC · JPL
428718	2008 RR_{41}	—	September 2, 2008	Kitt Peak	Spacewatch	·	1.5 km	MPC · JPL
428719	2008 RH_{43}	—	September 2, 2008	Kitt Peak	Spacewatch	·	1.7 km	MPC · JPL
428720	2008 RY_{48}	—	September 3, 2008	Kitt Peak	Spacewatch	L4	8.6 km	MPC · JPL
428721	2008 RP_{53}	—	October 11, 2004	Kitt Peak	Spacewatch	·	1.2 km	MPC · JPL
428722	2008 RQ_{57}	—	September 3, 2008	Kitt Peak	Spacewatch	HOF	1.9 km	MPC · JPL
428723	2008 RK_{59}	—	September 3, 2008	Kitt Peak	Spacewatch	MRX	1.0 km	MPC · JPL
428724	2008 RQ_{64}	—	September 4, 2008	Kitt Peak	Spacewatch	·	1.9 km	MPC · JPL
428725	2008 RC_{68}	—	September 4, 2008	Kitt Peak	Spacewatch	·	2.0 km	MPC · JPL
428726	2008 RF_{70}	—	September 5, 2008	Kitt Peak	Spacewatch	(5)	1.0 km	MPC · JPL
428727	2008 RJ_{74}	—	September 6, 2008	Catalina	CSS	·	1.9 km	MPC · JPL
428728	2008 RB_{82}	—	September 4, 2008	Kitt Peak	Spacewatch	GEF	1.2 km	MPC · JPL
428729	2008 RG_{85}	—	September 4, 2008	Kitt Peak	Spacewatch	·	1.9 km	MPC · JPL
428730	2008 RF_{87}	—	September 5, 2008	Kitt Peak	Spacewatch	MAR	1.2 km	MPC · JPL
428731	2008 RN_{87}	—	September 5, 2008	Kitt Peak	Spacewatch	·	1.8 km	MPC · JPL
428732	2008 RG_{99}	—	September 2, 2008	Kitt Peak	Spacewatch	L4	10 km	MPC · JPL
428733	2008 RV_{104}	—	September 6, 2008	Catalina	CSS	·	2.6 km	MPC · JPL
428734	2008 RW_{105}	—	September 6, 2008	Mount Lemmon	Mount Lemmon Survey	·	2.4 km	MPC · JPL
428735	2008 RX_{107}	—	September 9, 2008	Catalina	CSS	·	2.0 km	MPC · JPL
428736	2008 RS_{109}	—	September 2, 2008	Kitt Peak	Spacewatch	·	1.2 km	MPC · JPL
428737	2008 RY_{110}	—	September 3, 2008	Kitt Peak	Spacewatch	·	1.5 km	MPC · JPL
428738	2008 RG_{112}	—	September 4, 2008	Kitt Peak	Spacewatch	·	1.8 km	MPC · JPL
428739	2008 RH_{126}	—	September 2, 2008	Kitt Peak	Spacewatch	·	1.5 km	MPC · JPL
428740	2008 RT_{129}	—	September 7, 2008	Mount Lemmon	Mount Lemmon Survey	·	1.8 km	MPC · JPL
428741	2008 RO_{131}	—	September 3, 2008	Kitt Peak	Spacewatch	·	2.0 km	MPC · JPL
428742	2008 RC_{138}	—	September 5, 2008	Kitt Peak	Spacewatch	·	1.4 km	MPC · JPL
428743	2008 RR_{145}	—	September 6, 2008	Kitt Peak	Spacewatch	·	1.8 km	MPC · JPL
428744	2008 SL_{1}	—	September 22, 2008	Sierra Stars	Tozzi, F.	·	2.4 km	MPC · JPL
428745	2008 SL_{3}	—	September 22, 2008	Socorro	LINEAR	·	1.7 km	MPC · JPL
428746	2008 SQ_{4}	—	September 22, 2008	Socorro	LINEAR	·	1.5 km	MPC · JPL
428747	2008 SW_{5}	—	September 22, 2008	Socorro	LINEAR	DOR	3.2 km	MPC · JPL
428748	2008 SX_{15}	—	September 19, 2008	Kitt Peak	Spacewatch	·	2.4 km	MPC · JPL
428749	2008 SD_{19}	—	September 19, 2008	Kitt Peak	Spacewatch	·	1.6 km	MPC · JPL
428750	2008 SR_{23}	—	September 6, 2008	Mount Lemmon	Mount Lemmon Survey	·	1.7 km	MPC · JPL
428751	2008 SH_{42}	—	September 20, 2008	Kitt Peak	Spacewatch	·	1.5 km	MPC · JPL
428752	2008 SG_{46}	—	September 20, 2008	Kitt Peak	Spacewatch	·	2.0 km	MPC · JPL
428753	2008 SO_{58}	—	September 20, 2008	Kitt Peak	Spacewatch	·	1.8 km	MPC · JPL
428754	2008 SX_{58}	—	September 20, 2008	Kitt Peak	Spacewatch	·	1.9 km	MPC · JPL
428755	2008 SH_{72}	—	September 22, 2008	Kitt Peak	Spacewatch	·	1.9 km	MPC · JPL
428756	2008 SF_{73}	—	September 22, 2008	Catalina	CSS	BRG	1.8 km	MPC · JPL
428757	2008 SC_{92}	—	September 21, 2008	Kitt Peak	Spacewatch	·	1.6 km	MPC · JPL
428758	2008 SP_{96}	—	September 21, 2008	Kitt Peak	Spacewatch	·	1.6 km	MPC · JPL
428759	2008 SY_{101}	—	September 21, 2008	Mount Lemmon	Mount Lemmon Survey	EOS	1.9 km	MPC · JPL
428760	2008 SN_{108}	—	September 7, 2008	Mount Lemmon	Mount Lemmon Survey	·	1.5 km	MPC · JPL
428761	2008 SN_{121}	—	September 22, 2008	Mount Lemmon	Mount Lemmon Survey	TRE	1.8 km	MPC · JPL
428762	2008 SW_{121}	—	September 22, 2008	Mount Lemmon	Mount Lemmon Survey	·	2.4 km	MPC · JPL
428763	2008 SA_{134}	—	July 29, 2008	Kitt Peak	Spacewatch	·	1.3 km	MPC · JPL
428764	2008 SQ_{146}	—	September 23, 2008	Kitt Peak	Spacewatch	·	1.6 km	MPC · JPL
428765	2008 SY_{152}	—	September 22, 2008	Socorro	LINEAR	·	1.8 km	MPC · JPL
428766	2008 SE_{155}	—	September 23, 2008	Socorro	LINEAR	·	2.2 km	MPC · JPL
428767	2008 SO_{167}	—	September 26, 2008	Kitt Peak	Spacewatch	·	2.6 km	MPC · JPL
428768	2008 SP_{167}	—	September 28, 2008	Socorro	LINEAR	·	2.5 km	MPC · JPL
428769	2008 ST_{173}	—	September 22, 2008	Catalina	CSS	EUN	1.6 km	MPC · JPL
428770	2008 SQ_{181}	—	September 24, 2008	Kitt Peak	Spacewatch	H	540 m	MPC · JPL
428771	2008 SE_{194}	—	September 25, 2008	Kitt Peak	Spacewatch	HOF	3.6 km	MPC · JPL
428772	2008 SE_{195}	—	September 25, 2008	Kitt Peak	Spacewatch	BRA	1.3 km	MPC · JPL
428773	2008 SF_{200}	—	September 26, 2008	Kitt Peak	Spacewatch	·	1.6 km	MPC · JPL
428774	2008 SF_{204}	—	September 26, 2008	Kitt Peak	Spacewatch	NEM	2.3 km	MPC · JPL
428775	2008 SW_{206}	—	September 26, 2008	Kitt Peak	Spacewatch	·	2.5 km	MPC · JPL
428776	2008 ST_{217}	—	September 29, 2008	Mount Lemmon	Mount Lemmon Survey	EOS	2.2 km	MPC · JPL
428777	2008 SW_{217}	—	September 23, 2008	Kitt Peak	Spacewatch	·	2.0 km	MPC · JPL
428778	2008 SB_{220}	—	September 2, 2008	Kitt Peak	Spacewatch	·	1.9 km	MPC · JPL
428779	2008 SP_{226}	—	September 27, 2008	Mount Lemmon	Mount Lemmon Survey	AGN	1.1 km	MPC · JPL
428780	2008 SA_{232}	—	September 28, 2008	Mount Lemmon	Mount Lemmon Survey	·	1.4 km	MPC · JPL
428781	2008 SO_{241}	—	September 29, 2008	Catalina	CSS	AGN	1.2 km	MPC · JPL
428782	2008 SN_{256}	—	September 20, 2008	Mount Lemmon	Mount Lemmon Survey	·	1.6 km	MPC · JPL
428783	2008 SN_{258}	—	September 22, 2008	Mount Lemmon	Mount Lemmon Survey	·	2.1 km	MPC · JPL
428784	2008 SC_{275}	—	September 22, 2008	Kitt Peak	Spacewatch	GEF	1.2 km	MPC · JPL
428785	2008 SX_{275}	—	September 23, 2008	Mount Lemmon	Mount Lemmon Survey	HOF	2.1 km	MPC · JPL
428786	2008 SV_{278}	—	September 25, 2008	Kitt Peak	Spacewatch	·	2.5 km	MPC · JPL
428787	2008 SC_{280}	—	September 26, 2008	Kitt Peak	Spacewatch	AGN	1.1 km	MPC · JPL
428788	2008 SU_{280}	—	September 29, 2008	Mount Lemmon	Mount Lemmon Survey	·	2.9 km	MPC · JPL
428789	2008 SE_{286}	—	September 22, 2008	Kitt Peak	Spacewatch	(5)	1.2 km	MPC · JPL
428790	2008 SN_{286}	—	September 22, 2008	Kitt Peak	Spacewatch	·	2.2 km	MPC · JPL
428791	2008 SS_{287}	—	September 23, 2008	Mount Lemmon	Mount Lemmon Survey	·	1.9 km	MPC · JPL
428792	2008 SG_{292}	—	January 25, 2007	Catalina	CSS	H	580 m	MPC · JPL
428793	2008 SB_{293}	—	September 22, 2008	Mount Lemmon	Mount Lemmon Survey	·	1.6 km	MPC · JPL
428794	2008 SD_{293}	—	September 22, 2008	Catalina	CSS	·	2.6 km	MPC · JPL
428795	2008 SK_{293}	—	September 9, 2008	Kitt Peak	Spacewatch	EUN	1.4 km	MPC · JPL
428796	2008 SE_{295}	—	September 23, 2008	Catalina	CSS	·	1.9 km	MPC · JPL
428797	2008 SB_{296}	—	September 28, 2008	Catalina	CSS	·	1.9 km	MPC · JPL
428798	2008 SH_{303}	—	September 24, 2008	Kitt Peak	Spacewatch	KON	2.6 km	MPC · JPL
428799	2008 ST_{305}	—	September 28, 2008	Socorro	LINEAR	·	1.7 km	MPC · JPL
428800	2008 TM_{2}	—	October 4, 2008	La Sagra	OAM	H	480 m	MPC · JPL

== 428801–428900 ==
back to top

Designation			Discovery			Properties		Ref
Permanent	Provisional	Named after	Date	Site	Discoverer(s)	Category	Diam.	Ref
428801	2008 TN_{5}	—	September 6, 2008	Mount Lemmon	Mount Lemmon Survey	·	1.8 km	MPC · JPL
428802	2008 TB_{9}	—	September 7, 2008	Mount Lemmon	Mount Lemmon Survey	·	1.7 km	MPC · JPL
428803	2008 TH_{9}	—	October 7, 2008	Kachina	Hobart, J.	H	410 m	MPC · JPL
428804	2008 TV_{9}	—	October 7, 2008	Great Shefford	Birtwhistle, P.	·	1.6 km	MPC · JPL
428805	2008 TC_{23}	—	October 2, 2008	Mount Lemmon	Mount Lemmon Survey	·	2.9 km	MPC · JPL
428806	2008 TC_{26}	—	October 9, 2008	Great Shefford	Birtwhistle, P.	H	550 m	MPC · JPL
428807	2008 TH_{33}	—	September 22, 2008	Kitt Peak	Spacewatch	·	1.9 km	MPC · JPL
428808	2008 TA_{36}	—	September 21, 2008	Kitt Peak	Spacewatch	·	1.7 km	MPC · JPL
428809	2008 TF_{36}	—	October 1, 2008	Mount Lemmon	Mount Lemmon Survey	AGN	1.2 km	MPC · JPL
428810	2008 TK_{36}	—	October 1, 2008	Mount Lemmon	Mount Lemmon Survey	·	2.1 km	MPC · JPL
428811	2008 TE_{37}	—	September 4, 2008	Kitt Peak	Spacewatch	AGN	990 m	MPC · JPL
428812	2008 TJ_{50}	—	September 20, 2008	Mount Lemmon	Mount Lemmon Survey	·	1.7 km	MPC · JPL
428813	2008 TG_{57}	—	September 24, 2008	Kitt Peak	Spacewatch	·	1.5 km	MPC · JPL
428814	2008 TR_{62}	—	September 26, 2008	Kitt Peak	Spacewatch	KOR	1.2 km	MPC · JPL
428815	2008 TP_{65}	—	October 2, 2008	Catalina	CSS	·	2.6 km	MPC · JPL
428816	2008 TX_{68}	—	October 2, 2008	Kitt Peak	Spacewatch	KOR	1.3 km	MPC · JPL
428817	2008 TG_{73}	—	October 2, 2008	Kitt Peak	Spacewatch	·	2.4 km	MPC · JPL
428818	2008 TT_{78}	—	September 2, 2008	Kitt Peak	Spacewatch	AST	1.6 km	MPC · JPL
428819	2008 TV_{80}	—	October 2, 2008	Mount Lemmon	Mount Lemmon Survey	HOF	2.3 km	MPC · JPL
428820	2008 TD_{91}	—	October 3, 2008	La Sagra	OAM	MAR	1.6 km	MPC · JPL
428821	2008 TM_{105}	—	October 6, 2008	Kitt Peak	Spacewatch	·	1.8 km	MPC · JPL
428822	2008 TA_{106}	—	September 23, 2008	Mount Lemmon	Mount Lemmon Survey	ADE	2.2 km	MPC · JPL
428823	2008 TE_{109}	—	October 6, 2008	Mount Lemmon	Mount Lemmon Survey	·	1.3 km	MPC · JPL
428824	2008 TH_{109}	—	October 6, 2008	Mount Lemmon	Mount Lemmon Survey	·	1.4 km	MPC · JPL
428825	2008 TK_{112}	—	October 6, 2008	Catalina	CSS	H	600 m	MPC · JPL
428826	2008 TV_{116}	—	September 23, 2008	Catalina	CSS	·	2.7 km	MPC · JPL
428827	2008 TZ_{117}	—	October 6, 2008	Kitt Peak	Spacewatch	(1547)	1.9 km	MPC · JPL
428828	2008 TF_{123}	—	September 23, 2008	Kitt Peak	Spacewatch	·	1.1 km	MPC · JPL
428829	2008 TV_{127}	—	October 8, 2008	Mount Lemmon	Mount Lemmon Survey	·	2.0 km	MPC · JPL
428830	2008 TP_{141}	—	October 9, 2008	Mount Lemmon	Mount Lemmon Survey	AST	1.6 km	MPC · JPL
428831	2008 TC_{143}	—	February 24, 2006	Kitt Peak	Spacewatch	AGN	1.2 km	MPC · JPL
428832	2008 TN_{146}	—	September 3, 2008	Kitt Peak	Spacewatch	KOR	1.2 km	MPC · JPL
428833	2008 TN_{163}	—	October 1, 2008	Kitt Peak	Spacewatch	AGN	970 m	MPC · JPL
428834	2008 TF_{175}	—	October 8, 2008	Mount Lemmon	Mount Lemmon Survey	·	1.5 km	MPC · JPL
428835	2008 TX_{176}	—	October 10, 2008	Mount Lemmon	Mount Lemmon Survey	·	2.2 km	MPC · JPL
428836	2008 TZ_{182}	—	October 2, 2008	Kitt Peak	Spacewatch	·	2.2 km	MPC · JPL
428837	2008 TC_{186}	—	October 7, 2008	Mount Lemmon	Mount Lemmon Survey	·	2.2 km	MPC · JPL
428838	2008 UC_{2}	—	September 22, 2008	Catalina	CSS	ADE	2.7 km	MPC · JPL
428839	2008 UK_{5}	—	October 25, 2008	Socorro	LINEAR	H	570 m	MPC · JPL
428840	2008 UD_{10}	—	February 20, 2006	Kitt Peak	Spacewatch	HOF	2.6 km	MPC · JPL
428841	2008 UG_{11}	—	September 24, 2008	Kitt Peak	Spacewatch	·	2.0 km	MPC · JPL
428842	2008 UU_{31}	—	September 24, 2008	Mount Lemmon	Mount Lemmon Survey	·	1.7 km	MPC · JPL
428843	2008 UZ_{35}	—	September 29, 2003	Kitt Peak	Spacewatch	·	2.5 km	MPC · JPL
428844	2008 UC_{44}	—	October 20, 2008	Mount Lemmon	Mount Lemmon Survey	KOR	1.2 km	MPC · JPL
428845	2008 UH_{51}	—	October 6, 2008	Kitt Peak	Spacewatch	·	1.7 km	MPC · JPL
428846	2008 UJ_{51}	—	October 20, 2008	Kitt Peak	Spacewatch	EOS	1.9 km	MPC · JPL
428847	2008 UO_{56}	—	October 1, 2008	Kitt Peak	Spacewatch	·	1.7 km	MPC · JPL
428848	2008 US_{58}	—	October 19, 1999	Kitt Peak	Spacewatch	HOF	2.2 km	MPC · JPL
428849	2008 UG_{62}	—	October 21, 2008	Kitt Peak	Spacewatch	·	1.8 km	MPC · JPL
428850	2008 UT_{65}	—	October 21, 2008	Kitt Peak	Spacewatch	EOS	2.2 km	MPC · JPL
428851	2008 UT_{75}	—	October 21, 2008	Kitt Peak	Spacewatch	·	2.1 km	MPC · JPL
428852	2008 US_{84}	—	October 23, 2008	Kitt Peak	Spacewatch	·	1.8 km	MPC · JPL
428853	2008 UD_{88}	—	October 24, 2008	Catalina	CSS	·	2.3 km	MPC · JPL
428854	2008 UC_{103}	—	May 20, 2006	Kitt Peak	Spacewatch	·	2.8 km	MPC · JPL
428855	2008 UG_{106}	—	September 4, 2008	Kitt Peak	Spacewatch	·	1.8 km	MPC · JPL
428856	2008 UJ_{109}	—	October 3, 2008	Mount Lemmon	Mount Lemmon Survey	·	2.3 km	MPC · JPL
428857	2008 UC_{114}	—	October 22, 2008	Kitt Peak	Spacewatch	·	1.7 km	MPC · JPL
428858	2008 UG_{117}	—	October 22, 2008	Kitt Peak	Spacewatch	·	2.9 km	MPC · JPL
428859	2008 UA_{121}	—	October 22, 2008	Kitt Peak	Spacewatch	·	3.9 km	MPC · JPL
428860	2008 UT_{121}	—	October 22, 2008	Kitt Peak	Spacewatch	·	2.2 km	MPC · JPL
428861	2008 UN_{124}	—	October 22, 2008	Kitt Peak	Spacewatch	·	2.0 km	MPC · JPL
428862	2008 UK_{125}	—	October 22, 2008	Kitt Peak	Spacewatch	·	1.8 km	MPC · JPL
428863	2008 UW_{126}	—	October 22, 2008	Mount Lemmon	Mount Lemmon Survey	·	3.1 km	MPC · JPL
428864	2008 UQ_{130}	—	October 23, 2008	Kitt Peak	Spacewatch	·	1.8 km	MPC · JPL
428865	2008 UF_{133}	—	October 23, 2008	Kitt Peak	Spacewatch	·	2.3 km	MPC · JPL
428866	2008 UB_{143}	—	October 23, 2008	Kitt Peak	Spacewatch	EOS	1.4 km	MPC · JPL
428867	2008 UE_{163}	—	October 10, 2008	Mount Lemmon	Mount Lemmon Survey	·	1.6 km	MPC · JPL
428868	2008 UE_{165}	—	October 24, 2008	Kitt Peak	Spacewatch	·	2.0 km	MPC · JPL
428869	2008 UT_{167}	—	October 24, 2008	Kitt Peak	Spacewatch	THM	2.4 km	MPC · JPL
428870	2008 UA_{183}	—	October 24, 2008	Mount Lemmon	Mount Lemmon Survey	·	2.2 km	MPC · JPL
428871	2008 UO_{188}	—	October 24, 2008	Kitt Peak	Spacewatch	·	1.5 km	MPC · JPL
428872	2008 UF_{193}	—	October 25, 2008	Mount Lemmon	Mount Lemmon Survey	EUN	1.2 km	MPC · JPL
428873	2008 UJ_{197}	—	October 6, 2008	Mount Lemmon	Mount Lemmon Survey	HOF	2.3 km	MPC · JPL
428874	2008 UG_{220}	—	October 25, 2008	Kitt Peak	Spacewatch	·	1.4 km	MPC · JPL
428875	2008 UB_{229}	—	September 24, 2008	Mount Lemmon	Mount Lemmon Survey	·	1.9 km	MPC · JPL
428876	2008 UL_{247}	—	March 9, 2005	Mount Lemmon	Mount Lemmon Survey	·	1.5 km	MPC · JPL
428877	2008 UY_{265}	—	October 28, 2008	Kitt Peak	Spacewatch	HOF	2.2 km	MPC · JPL
428878	2008 UO_{287}	—	October 28, 2008	Mount Lemmon	Mount Lemmon Survey	·	2.2 km	MPC · JPL
428879	2008 UL_{290}	—	October 28, 2008	Kitt Peak	Spacewatch	·	1.8 km	MPC · JPL
428880	2008 UB_{299}	—	October 29, 2008	Kitt Peak	Spacewatch	·	1.6 km	MPC · JPL
428881	2008 UQ_{300}	—	September 29, 2008	Socorro	LINEAR	·	2.1 km	MPC · JPL
428882	2008 UP_{304}	—	April 7, 2006	Kitt Peak	Spacewatch	·	2.2 km	MPC · JPL
428883	2008 UL_{306}	—	October 30, 2008	Kitt Peak	Spacewatch	fast?	2.0 km	MPC · JPL
428884	2008 UO_{306}	—	October 30, 2008	Catalina	CSS	EUN	1.7 km	MPC · JPL
428885	2008 UR_{306}	—	September 24, 2008	Mount Lemmon	Mount Lemmon Survey	·	2.1 km	MPC · JPL
428886	2008 UJ_{315}	—	September 24, 2008	Kitt Peak	Spacewatch	·	2.1 km	MPC · JPL
428887	2008 UG_{328}	—	September 24, 2008	Mount Lemmon	Mount Lemmon Survey	·	2.0 km	MPC · JPL
428888	2008 UW_{334}	—	October 20, 2008	Kitt Peak	Spacewatch	·	2.0 km	MPC · JPL
428889	2008 UW_{335}	—	October 20, 2008	Kitt Peak	Spacewatch	·	1.9 km	MPC · JPL
428890	2008 UD_{337}	—	October 20, 2008	Kitt Peak	Spacewatch	·	1.7 km	MPC · JPL
428891	2008 UK_{339}	—	October 23, 2008	Kitt Peak	Spacewatch	·	1.8 km	MPC · JPL
428892	2008 UE_{341}	—	October 25, 2008	Kitt Peak	Spacewatch	·	2.6 km	MPC · JPL
428893	2008 UN_{342}	—	October 28, 2008	Mount Lemmon	Mount Lemmon Survey	·	1.6 km	MPC · JPL
428894	2008 UK_{348}	—	October 24, 2008	Catalina	CSS	·	1.3 km	MPC · JPL
428895	2008 UH_{350}	—	October 21, 2008	Kitt Peak	Spacewatch	·	2.0 km	MPC · JPL
428896	2008 UK_{352}	—	October 24, 2008	Mount Lemmon	Mount Lemmon Survey	EOS	5.2 km	MPC · JPL
428897	2008 UY_{353}	—	October 21, 2008	Kitt Peak	Spacewatch	EOS	1.7 km	MPC · JPL
428898	2008 UF_{357}	—	October 24, 2008	Kitt Peak	Spacewatch	·	2.2 km	MPC · JPL
428899	2008 UJ_{357}	—	October 24, 2008	Kitt Peak	Spacewatch	·	1.5 km	MPC · JPL
428900	2008 UP_{359}	—	October 28, 2008	Kitt Peak	Spacewatch	HOF	2.6 km	MPC · JPL

== 428901–429000 ==
back to top

Designation			Discovery			Properties		Ref
Permanent	Provisional	Named after	Date	Site	Discoverer(s)	Category	Diam.	Ref
428901	2008 UA_{363}	—	October 7, 2008	Catalina	CSS	H	580 m	MPC · JPL
428902	2008 UA_{369}	—	October 26, 2008	Mount Lemmon	Mount Lemmon Survey	HYG	3.2 km	MPC · JPL
428903	2008 VZ	—	November 1, 2008	Needville	J. Dellinger, Sexton, C.	·	3.2 km	MPC · JPL
428904	2008 VG_{11}	—	March 23, 2006	Kitt Peak	Spacewatch	AGN	1.5 km	MPC · JPL
428905	2008 VS_{22}	—	November 1, 2008	Mount Lemmon	Mount Lemmon Survey	·	1.7 km	MPC · JPL
428906	2008 VL_{24}	—	November 1, 2008	Kitt Peak	Spacewatch	·	1.9 km	MPC · JPL
428907	2008 VV_{26}	—	November 2, 2008	Kitt Peak	Spacewatch	HOF	2.7 km	MPC · JPL
428908	2008 VN_{34}	—	November 2, 2008	Mount Lemmon	Mount Lemmon Survey	·	1.6 km	MPC · JPL
428909	2008 VX_{39}	—	November 2, 2008	Kitt Peak	Spacewatch	EOS	2.4 km	MPC · JPL
428910	2008 VE_{43}	—	March 11, 2005	Mount Lemmon	Mount Lemmon Survey	·	2.3 km	MPC · JPL
428911	2008 VH_{59}	—	November 7, 2008	Catalina	CSS	GEF	1.3 km	MPC · JPL
428912	2008 VL_{62}	—	September 22, 2008	Mount Lemmon	Mount Lemmon Survey	·	1.7 km	MPC · JPL
428913	2008 VY_{62}	—	November 8, 2008	Kitt Peak	Spacewatch	KOR	1.3 km	MPC · JPL
428914	2008 VT_{67}	—	November 8, 2008	Kitt Peak	Spacewatch	EOS	2.0 km	MPC · JPL
428915	2008 VX_{69}	—	October 23, 2008	Mount Lemmon	Mount Lemmon Survey	·	1.8 km	MPC · JPL
428916	2008 VA_{70}	—	November 6, 2008	Mount Lemmon	Mount Lemmon Survey	KOR	1.2 km	MPC · JPL
428917	2008 VK_{70}	—	November 7, 2008	Mount Lemmon	Mount Lemmon Survey	·	1.9 km	MPC · JPL
428918	2008 VQ_{74}	—	November 9, 2008	Kitt Peak	Spacewatch	KOR	1.2 km	MPC · JPL
428919	2008 WE_{10}	—	October 23, 2008	Kitt Peak	Spacewatch	·	1.9 km	MPC · JPL
428920	2008 WX_{11}	—	November 18, 2008	Catalina	CSS	·	1.9 km	MPC · JPL
428921	2008 WN_{17}	—	September 6, 2008	Mount Lemmon	Mount Lemmon Survey	·	1.7 km	MPC · JPL
428922	2008 WC_{43}	—	November 17, 2008	Kitt Peak	Spacewatch	·	1.6 km	MPC · JPL
428923	2008 WY_{52}	—	October 24, 2008	Kitt Peak	Spacewatch	·	2.0 km	MPC · JPL
428924	2008 WV_{54}	—	November 19, 2008	Mount Lemmon	Mount Lemmon Survey	·	2.9 km	MPC · JPL
428925	2008 WA_{61}	—	September 27, 2008	Mount Lemmon	Mount Lemmon Survey	·	1.5 km	MPC · JPL
428926	2008 WE_{67}	—	October 28, 2008	Kitt Peak	Spacewatch	·	1.5 km	MPC · JPL
428927	2008 WJ_{89}	—	November 21, 2008	Mount Lemmon	Mount Lemmon Survey	EOS	1.9 km	MPC · JPL
428928	2008 WO_{89}	—	November 21, 2008	Kitt Peak	Spacewatch	·	3.0 km	MPC · JPL
428929	2008 WJ_{104}	—	November 30, 2008	Mount Lemmon	Mount Lemmon Survey	·	1.5 km	MPC · JPL
428930	2008 WO_{110}	—	October 26, 2008	Kitt Peak	Spacewatch	·	1.8 km	MPC · JPL
428931	2008 WB_{112}	—	November 30, 2008	Kitt Peak	Spacewatch	·	2.8 km	MPC · JPL
428932	2008 WE_{116}	—	November 18, 2008	Kitt Peak	Spacewatch	KOR	1.2 km	MPC · JPL
428933	2008 WG_{118}	—	October 29, 2008	Kitt Peak	Spacewatch	·	2.2 km	MPC · JPL
428934	2008 WU_{119}	—	March 4, 2005	Mount Lemmon	Mount Lemmon Survey	·	1.6 km	MPC · JPL
428935	2008 WP_{125}	—	November 24, 2008	Mount Lemmon	Mount Lemmon Survey	T_{j} (2.98)	4.4 km	MPC · JPL
428936	2008 WS_{128}	—	September 14, 2007	Mount Lemmon	Mount Lemmon Survey	THM	2.1 km	MPC · JPL
428937	2008 WF_{129}	—	November 19, 2008	Kitt Peak	Spacewatch	·	1.8 km	MPC · JPL
428938	2008 WJ_{130}	—	November 21, 2008	Kitt Peak	Spacewatch	·	2.3 km	MPC · JPL
428939	2008 WX_{133}	—	October 3, 2008	Mount Lemmon	Mount Lemmon Survey	·	2.4 km	MPC · JPL
428940	2008 XA	—	December 1, 2008	Mount Lemmon	Mount Lemmon Survey	L4	12 km	MPC · JPL
428941	2008 XU_{14}	—	December 1, 2008	Kitt Peak	Spacewatch	·	5.2 km	MPC · JPL
428942	2008 XX_{21}	—	December 1, 2008	Kitt Peak	Spacewatch	·	2.7 km	MPC · JPL
428943	2008 XY_{21}	—	December 1, 2008	Kitt Peak	Spacewatch	·	2.4 km	MPC · JPL
428944	2008 XY_{33}	—	October 29, 2008	Kitt Peak	Spacewatch	·	3.1 km	MPC · JPL
428945	2008 XV_{35}	—	November 19, 2008	Kitt Peak	Spacewatch	·	2.1 km	MPC · JPL
428946	2008 XG_{48}	—	December 4, 2008	Mount Lemmon	Mount Lemmon Survey	·	2.4 km	MPC · JPL
428947	2008 XT_{49}	—	December 4, 2008	Mount Lemmon	Mount Lemmon Survey	·	4.6 km	MPC · JPL
428948	2008 XS_{51}	—	December 2, 2008	Kitt Peak	Spacewatch	·	1.7 km	MPC · JPL
428949	2008 YV_{8}	—	December 23, 2008	Piszkéstető	K. Sárneczky	·	2.6 km	MPC · JPL
428950	2008 YG_{11}	—	December 20, 2008	Mount Lemmon	Mount Lemmon Survey	EOS	2.2 km	MPC · JPL
428951	2008 YJ_{22}	—	December 21, 2008	Mount Lemmon	Mount Lemmon Survey	·	2.5 km	MPC · JPL
428952	2008 YR_{26}	—	October 31, 2008	Mount Lemmon	Mount Lemmon Survey	·	3.5 km	MPC · JPL
428953	2008 YL_{40}	—	December 29, 2008	Mount Lemmon	Mount Lemmon Survey	·	3.0 km	MPC · JPL
428954	2008 YG_{42}	—	November 18, 2008	Kitt Peak	Spacewatch	EOS	1.8 km	MPC · JPL
428955	2008 YB_{49}	—	December 29, 2008	Mount Lemmon	Mount Lemmon Survey	·	3.5 km	MPC · JPL
428956	2008 YN_{58}	—	December 22, 2008	Kitt Peak	Spacewatch	·	2.6 km	MPC · JPL
428957	2008 YE_{70}	—	January 22, 1998	Kitt Peak	Spacewatch	EOS	2.3 km	MPC · JPL
428958	2008 YM_{91}	—	December 29, 2008	Kitt Peak	Spacewatch	EOS	2.1 km	MPC · JPL
428959	2008 YL_{98}	—	December 29, 2008	Kitt Peak	Spacewatch	·	2.8 km	MPC · JPL
428960	2008 YK_{100}	—	December 21, 2008	Mount Lemmon	Mount Lemmon Survey	·	2.4 km	MPC · JPL
428961	2008 YN_{105}	—	December 29, 2008	Kitt Peak	Spacewatch	·	2.7 km	MPC · JPL
428962	2008 YD_{109}	—	December 29, 2008	Kitt Peak	Spacewatch	·	2.6 km	MPC · JPL
428963	2008 YP_{121}	—	December 30, 2008	Mount Lemmon	Mount Lemmon Survey	·	3.5 km	MPC · JPL
428964	2008 YA_{122}	—	December 30, 2008	Kitt Peak	Spacewatch	·	1.9 km	MPC · JPL
428965	2008 YL_{132}	—	December 21, 2008	Kitt Peak	Spacewatch	·	2.6 km	MPC · JPL
428966	2008 YD_{133}	—	October 24, 2008	Mount Lemmon	Mount Lemmon Survey	·	2.6 km	MPC · JPL
428967	2008 YM_{139}	—	December 7, 2008	Mount Lemmon	Mount Lemmon Survey	·	3.8 km	MPC · JPL
428968	2008 YF_{140}	—	December 30, 2008	Mount Lemmon	Mount Lemmon Survey	·	2.7 km	MPC · JPL
428969	2008 YZ_{140}	—	December 30, 2008	Mount Lemmon	Mount Lemmon Survey	·	2.6 km	MPC · JPL
428970	2008 YD_{147}	—	December 31, 2008	Kitt Peak	Spacewatch	·	2.5 km	MPC · JPL
428971	2008 YS_{150}	—	December 22, 2008	Kitt Peak	Spacewatch	·	2.5 km	MPC · JPL
428972	2008 YT_{152}	—	December 30, 2008	Mount Lemmon	Mount Lemmon Survey	·	2.4 km	MPC · JPL
428973	2008 YG_{155}	—	December 22, 2008	Kitt Peak	Spacewatch	THM	2.0 km	MPC · JPL
428974	2008 YT_{157}	—	December 29, 2008	Mount Lemmon	Mount Lemmon Survey	·	3.6 km	MPC · JPL
428975	2008 YV_{157}	—	August 10, 2007	Kitt Peak	Spacewatch	(31811)	3.5 km	MPC · JPL
428976	2008 YW_{158}	—	December 30, 2008	Kitt Peak	Spacewatch	THM	1.9 km	MPC · JPL
428977	2008 YM_{160}	—	December 30, 2008	Mount Lemmon	Mount Lemmon Survey	CYB	3.3 km	MPC · JPL
428978	2008 YP_{160}	—	December 30, 2008	Mount Lemmon	Mount Lemmon Survey	·	3.1 km	MPC · JPL
428979	2008 YS_{161}	—	December 21, 2008	Mount Lemmon	Mount Lemmon Survey	THM	2.0 km	MPC · JPL
428980	2008 YW_{162}	—	December 22, 2008	Mount Lemmon	Mount Lemmon Survey	THM	2.1 km	MPC · JPL
428981	2008 YF_{163}	—	December 30, 2008	Kitt Peak	Spacewatch	·	3.0 km	MPC · JPL
428982	2008 YL_{164}	—	December 22, 2008	Kitt Peak	Spacewatch	·	4.0 km	MPC · JPL
428983	2008 YC_{168}	—	December 22, 2008	Mount Lemmon	Mount Lemmon Survey	·	3.3 km	MPC · JPL
428984	2009 AC_{4}	—	January 1, 2009	Mount Lemmon	Mount Lemmon Survey	·	2.6 km	MPC · JPL
428985	2009 AC_{10}	—	January 2, 2009	Mount Lemmon	Mount Lemmon Survey	·	3.2 km	MPC · JPL
428986	2009 AU_{12}	—	January 2, 2009	Mount Lemmon	Mount Lemmon Survey	·	3.7 km	MPC · JPL
428987	2009 AY_{12}	—	January 2, 2009	Mount Lemmon	Mount Lemmon Survey	·	2.8 km	MPC · JPL
428988	2009 AY_{13}	—	December 22, 2008	Kitt Peak	Spacewatch	·	2.8 km	MPC · JPL
428989	2009 AO_{25}	—	December 22, 2008	Kitt Peak	Spacewatch	·	2.4 km	MPC · JPL
428990	2009 AU_{25}	—	January 2, 2009	Kitt Peak	Spacewatch	·	2.2 km	MPC · JPL
428991	2009 AE_{26}	—	January 2, 2009	Kitt Peak	Spacewatch	·	4.2 km	MPC · JPL
428992	2009 AR_{30}	—	September 14, 2006	Kitt Peak	Spacewatch	·	4.2 km	MPC · JPL
428993	2009 AH_{50}	—	January 1, 2009	Kitt Peak	Spacewatch	·	2.7 km	MPC · JPL
428994	2009 BO_{4}	—	October 17, 2008	Kitt Peak	Spacewatch	·	3.4 km	MPC · JPL
428995	2009 BU_{10}	—	January 25, 2009	Mayhill	Lowe, A.	·	3.4 km	MPC · JPL
428996	2009 BL_{28}	—	November 21, 2008	Mount Lemmon	Mount Lemmon Survey	HYG	2.7 km	MPC · JPL
428997	2009 BU_{30}	—	January 16, 2009	Mount Lemmon	Mount Lemmon Survey	EOS	1.7 km	MPC · JPL
428998	2009 BQ_{31}	—	January 16, 2009	Kitt Peak	Spacewatch	EOS	2.4 km	MPC · JPL
428999	2009 BU_{35}	—	January 16, 2009	Kitt Peak	Spacewatch	·	2.5 km	MPC · JPL
429000	2009 BD_{37}	—	January 16, 2009	Kitt Peak	Spacewatch	·	2.2 km	MPC · JPL

back to top

== Meaning of names ==
As minor planet discoveries are confirmed, they are given a permanent number by the IAU's Minor Planet Center (MPC), and the discoverers can then submit names for them, following the IAU's naming conventions. The list below concerns those minor planets in the specified number-range that have received names, and explains the meanings of those names.

Official naming citations of newly named small Solar System bodies are approved and published in a bulletin by IAU's Working Group for Small Bodies Nomenclature (WGSBN). Before May 2021, citations were published in MPC's Minor Planet Circulars for many decades. Recent citations can also be found on the JPL Small-Body Database (SBDB). Until his death in 2016, German astronomer Lutz D. Schmadel compiled these citations into the Dictionary of Minor Planet Names (DMP) and regularly updated the collection.

Based on Paul Herget's The Names of the Minor Planets, Schmadel also researched the unclear origin of numerous asteroids, most of which had been named prior to World War II. This article incorporates text from this source, which is in the public domain: SBDB New namings may only be added to this list below after official publication as the preannouncement of names is condemned. The WGSBN publishes a comprehensive guideline for the naming rules of non-cometary small Solar System bodies.

Named minor planet	Provisional	This minor planet was named for...	Ref · Catalog
428102 Rolandwagner	2006 QO_{137}	Roland C. Wagner (1960–2012), a French author, journalist, literary critic, translator and sometime singer, who wrote dozens of sci-fi novels.	JPL · 428102
428259 Laphil	2007 CA_{6}	The Los Angeles Philharmonic, founded in 1919, is an American orchestra based in Los Angeles, California.	IAU · 428259
428351 Martinchalifour	2007 OT_{5}	Martin Chalifour (b. 1961), the principal concertmaster of the Los Angeles Philharmonic.	IAU · 428351
428694 Saulė	2008 OS_{9}	Saulė is a solar goddess, the solar deity in both the Latvian and Lithuanian mythologies.	JPL · 428694
