= Roland Charles Wagner =

French writer

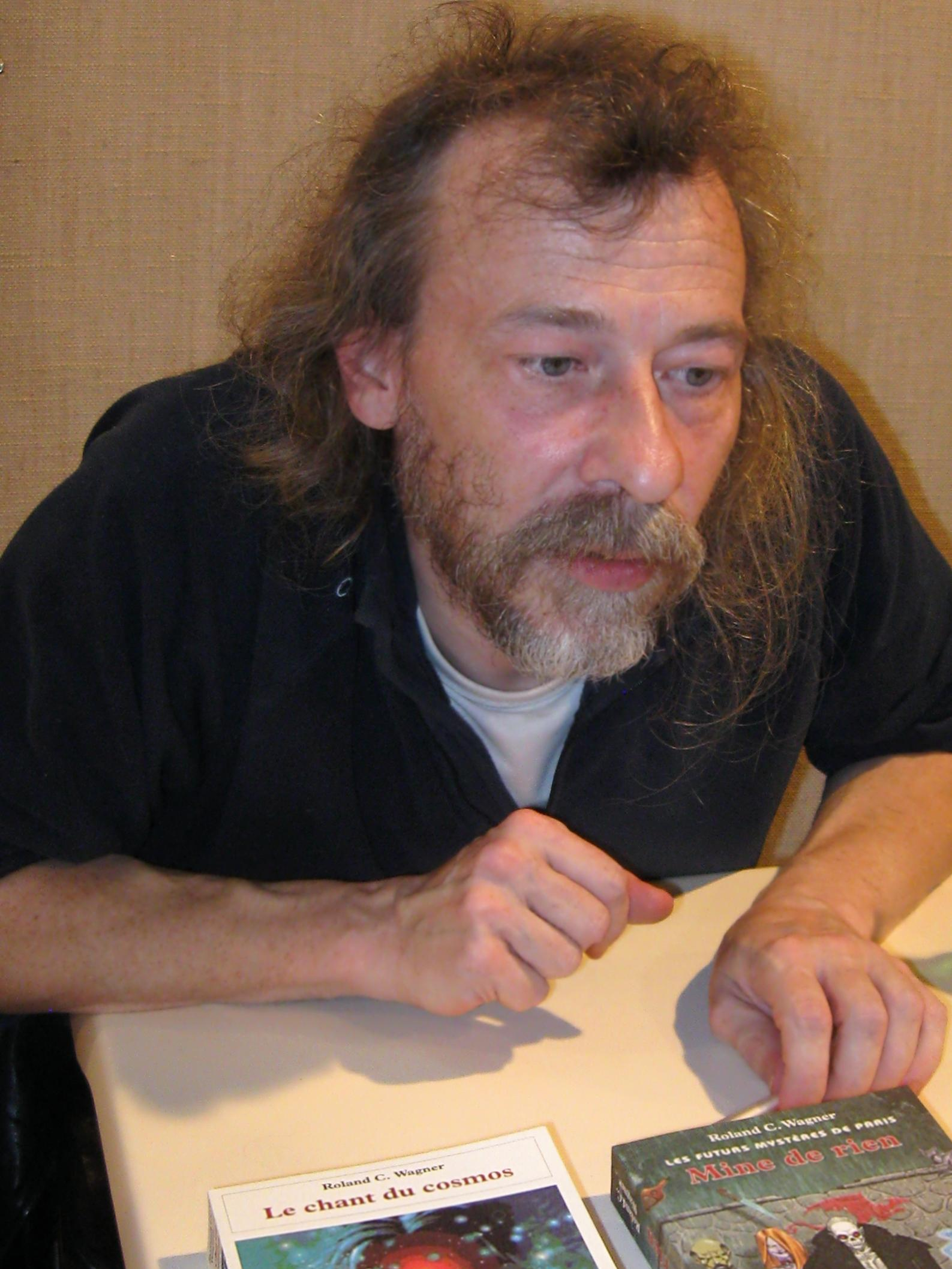
Roland C. Wagner, December 2010

Roland C. Wagner (6 September 1960 – 5 August 2012) was a French writer of humorous science fiction. Since his professional debut in 1981, he wrote around one hundred novellas and around fifty novels. He was the only writer to have received the Prix Rosny-Aîné seven times, as well as many other awards.

== Biography ==
Roland Wagner was born in Bab El Oued, Algeria during the Algerian War of Independence. After the war, his family left Algeria like many Pieds-Noirs and settled in Clamart. Throughout his youth, Wagner was an avid reader of Fleuve Noir Anticipation and other science-fiction stories. He began writing his own stories at age 15. In 1981, he won the Prix Rosny-Aîné for his short story Faire-part. He was killed in an automobile accident on 5 August 2012.

== Major works ==
=== Histoire d'un futur ===
Les Futurs Mystères de Paris ("The Future Mysteries of Paris") features a "transparent" (not exactly invisible) private detective. Starting with La Balle du néant ("The Bullet From Nowhere"), this cycle has nine titles (up to Mine de rien, 2006) inside a larger set, including Le Chant du cosmos ("The Song of the Cosmos"), a far-future tale which describes a mental game inspired by Go.

=== Rêves de Gloire ===
Rêves de Gloire (Dreams of Glory) is an alternate history of Algeria with several divergence points. One of them is the assassination of Charles de Gaulle before the Évian Accords.

=== Other works ===
Roland C. Wagner wrote under multiple pseudonyms, including Richard Wolfram and Red Deff.

La Saison de la sorcière ("Season of the Witch", 2003) takes place in France with extremely high-level police security, which is invaded by the United States. The novel received the Bob Morane Prize and the Prix Rosny-Aîné in 2004. Le Temps du voyage ("Trip Time", 2005) is a space opera in the mood of Jack Vance.

He also wrote an alternate history biography of H. P. Lovecraft under the title HPL (1890–1991) which has been translated in English, and several pastiches of famous science fiction authors. For example, his Three Laws of Robotic Sexuality parodies Isaac Asimov's robot stories.

== Other activities ==
=== Music ===
He also wrote lyrics for rock bands, and was a member of the acid punk group Brain Damage, beginning in 1977.

== Awards and honors ==
Asteroid 428102 Rolandwagner, discovered by astronomer Bernard Christophe at Saint-Sulpice Observatory (947) in 2006, was named in his memory. The official naming citation was published by the Minor Planet Center on 2 February 2017 (MPC 103030).

== Selected bibliography (novels) ==
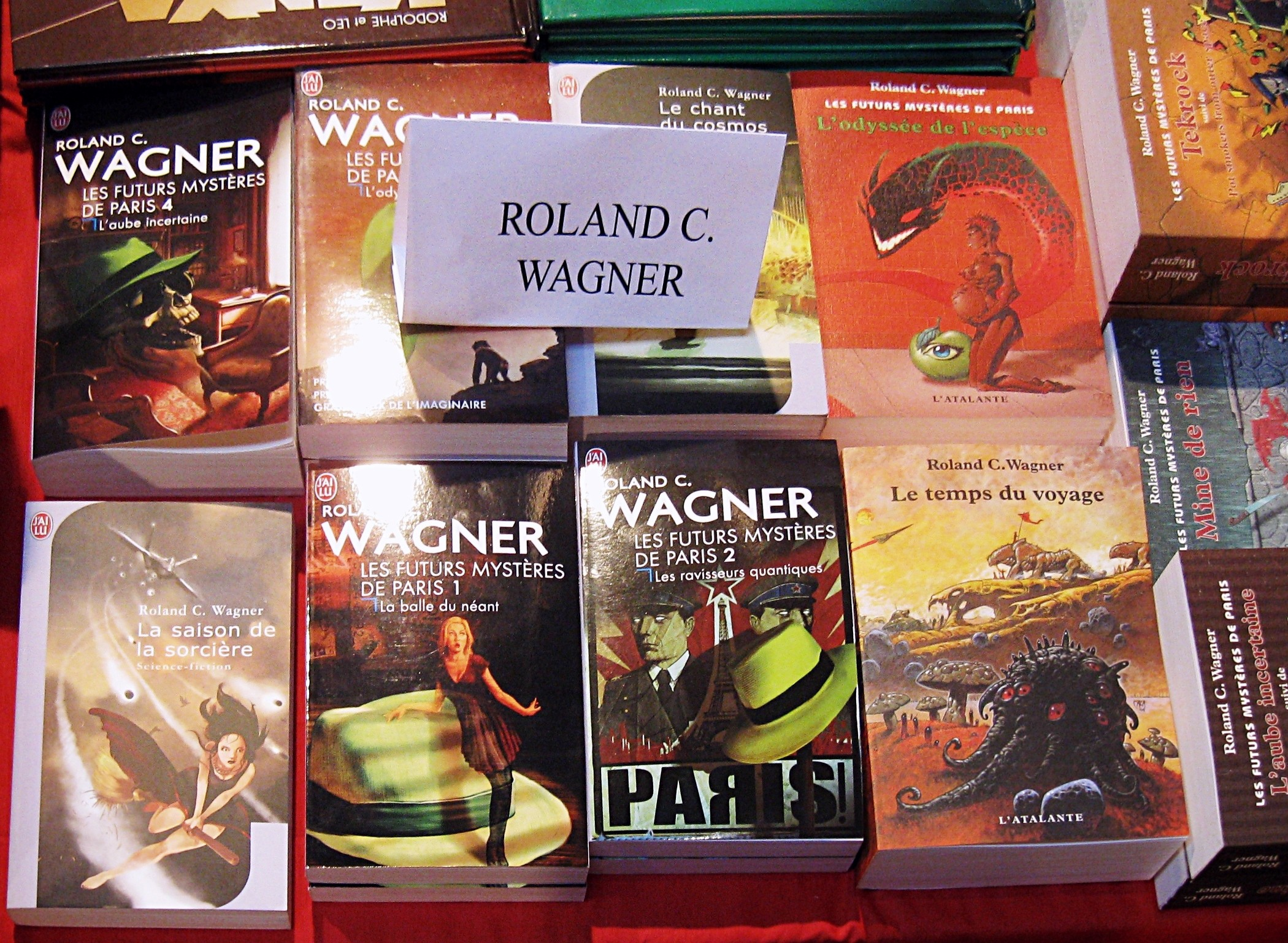

- Le Serpent d'angoisse (1987)
- Poupée aux yeux morts (1988) (alternate title: L'Œil du fouinain)
- Le paysage déchiré (1989)
- Les derniers jours de mai (1989)
- Les Psychopompes de Klash (1990)
- La Sinsé gravite au 21 (1991)
- Cette crédille qui nous ronge (1991)
- La Balle du néant (1996)
- Les Ravisseurs quantiques (1996)
- L'Odyssée de l'espèce (1997)
- L'Aube incertaine (1997)
- Tekrock (1999)
- Le Chant du Cosmos (1999)
- Tøøns (2000)
- Musique de l'énergie (2000 – short story collection)
- Babaluma (2002)
- Kali Yuga (2003)
- La Saison de la sorcière (2003)
- Le Temps du voyage (2005)
- Pax Americana (2005)
- L.G.M. (2006)
- Mine de rien (2006)
- Rêves de Gloire (2011)

== See also ==
- French science fiction
