= Brain Damage (band) =

French rock band

- Origin: Villeurbanne, Lyon, France
- Genres: Garage rock, garage punk, psychedelic rock, punk rock, new wave
- Years active: 1977–1984; 1988–2012
- Labels: Skydog, Celluloid
- Past members: Haylock M.S. Ellis (deceased); Éric Poli; Didier Borgatta; Philippe Poiret; Hubert Evrard; Roland C. Wagner (deceased)

Brain Damage are a French rock band, formed in 1977 by Haylock M.S. Ellis (guitar) and Philippe Poiret (guitar, keyboards, vocals). The French science fiction writer Roland C. Wagner was added as a singer in 1983. At that time, they played a mixture of punk, new wave and garage rock. They split in late 1984. 1984's Live au Cithéa is the only recording surviving from this period, recorded on 15 September 1984.

Ellis, Poiret and Wagner got together again in 1988, with a new rhythm section, playing psychedelic garage. They obtained the nickname 'The French Fuzztones'. After the departure of Poiret in the early 1990s, Ellis and Wagner decided to stop performing and focus on recording. A single was issued in 1996, presenting Brain Damage on one side and X-Men on the other, X-Men being another side project of Ellis. Then a self-titled album was issued in 1999 as a private release. Both are now very rare.

In 2006, Brain Damage released their second album under one of the Creative Commons licenses on the free music platform Jamendo. It is a collection of recordings spawning more than fifteen years, mostly punk and/or psychedelic with science fiction inspired lyrics — among them "Quand le paysage se déchire" ("When the Landscape Tears") a song about Philip K. Dick; and "Un été de serre" inspired by Norman Spinrad's novel Greenhouse Summer, which Wagner translated into French. Most of their recorded work is now online as they work on projects including their next album, and the soundtrack to Wagner's next novel.

== Discography ==
=== Albums ===
- 1992 : La Ténèbre (tape)
- 1993 : (T'aimer) C'est aller à la Mort (tape)
- 1996 : Brain Damage (split single with X-Men)
- 1996 : Envie de huuurler ! (démo tape)
- 1999 : Brain Damage (CD)
- 2006 : Visages sur l'écran (e-LP)
- 2007 : Brain Damage (e-LP, modified reissue of the CD)
- 2007 : Clique sur le mulot (e-single)
- 2007 : 1984 (Live au Cithéa) (e-LP, recorded in 1984)
- 2007 : La Ténèbre (e-single)
- 2007 : Consensus zéro (e-single)
- 2007 : Love-In 67 (e-single)
- 2007 : Pompiers hallucinés (e-LP)
- 2007 : Drop-Out 68 (e-single)
- 2007 : Let's Go 69! (Single virtuel)

=== Compilation albums ===
- 2006 : "Un été de serre" on Compilsa vol. 1
- 2007 : "Sur le mont (Timothy Leary)" on Les Compiles à Marcel vol. 1
