= Merveilleux scientifique =

French literary genre

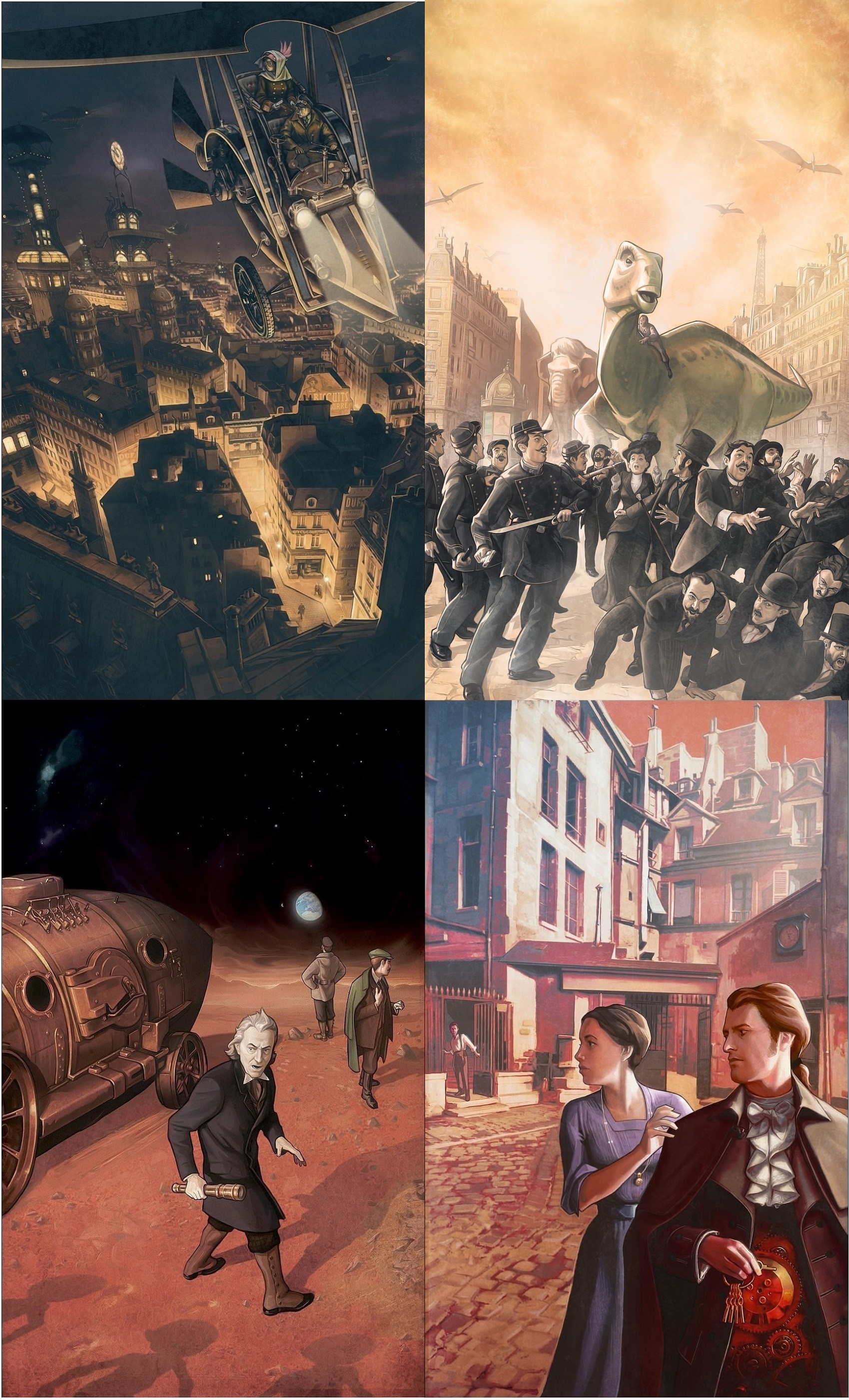
A few themes from the merveilleux scientifique genre, clockwise: the omnipresence of urban air transport, prehistoric creatures rampaging through Paris, artificial man, interplanetary flight and extraterrestrial encounters... Illustrations by Thomas Girard-Prince Gigi for Le Vingtième Siècle. La vie électrique by Albert Robida, L'Effrayante Aventure by Jules Lermina, La Poupée sanglante by Gaston Leroux and Doctor Omega by Arnould Galopin.

Merveilleux scientifique (also spelled with a hyphen: merveilleux-scientifique, literally translated "scientific marvelous") is a literary genre that developed in France from the end of the 19th century to the middle of the 20th century. Akin today to science fiction, this literature of scientific imagination revolves around key themes such as mad scientists and their extraordinary inventions, lost worlds, exploration of the Solar System, catastrophes and the advent of supermen.

Emerging in the wake of Jules Verne's scientific novels, this literary current took shape in the second half of the 19th century, moving away from the Verne model and centering on a new generation of authors such as Albert Robida, Camille Flammarion, J.-H. Rosny aîné and Maurice Renard, the latter claiming the works of the more imaginative novelists Edgar Allan Poe and H. G. Wells as his model. Consequently, in 1909 Renard published a manifesto in which he appropriated a neologism coined in the 19th century, "merveilleux scientifique", adding a hyphen to emphasize the link between the modernization of the fairy tale and the rationalization of the supernatural. Thus defined, the merveilleux-scientifique novel, set within a rational framework, relies on the alteration of a scientific law around which the plot is built, in order to give the reader food for thought by presenting the threats and delights of science.

Mainly employed by popular novelists, this genre draws on the sciences and pseudo-sciences that resonate with public opinion, such as radiographic, electrical and biological discoveries. However, despite the theoretical foundation provided by Maurice Renard in 1909, merveilleux-scientifique literature failed to take shape as a literary movement, and in the end constituted no more than a heterogeneous and scattered literary whole. Despite the arrival of a new generation of authors such as José Moselli, René Thévenin, Théo Varlet, Jacques Spitz and André Maurois, this literature failed to renew itself and gradually declined from the 1930s onwards, while at the same time, in the United States, literature of scientific imagination enjoyed great success under the name of "science fiction", with a broadening of its themes. Presented as a new genre, science fiction arrived in France in the 1950s and, seducing French authors and readers, completed the demise of the merveilleux-scientifique current and its generations of writers.

A marginal and unassumed genre during the second half of the 20th century, merveilleux scientifique has been the subject of renewed public attention since the late 1990s, thanks to the critical work of a number of researchers and the reappropriation of this forgotten literary genre by authors, particularly in the comic strip medium.

== Origins ==
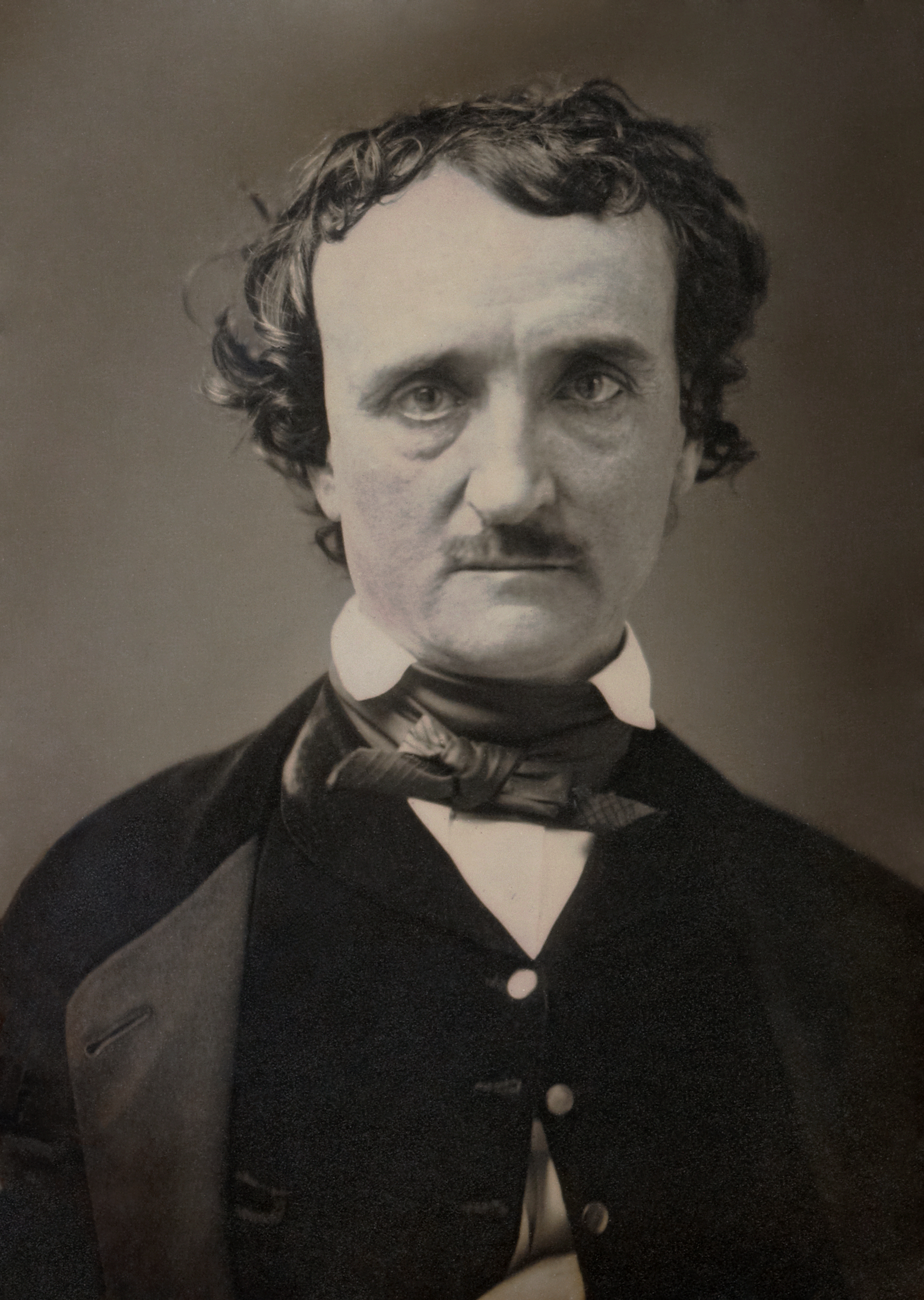
Published in the first half of the 19th century, Edgar Allan Poe's novels and short stories frequently use the figure of the scientist and the theme of scientific discovery, prefiguring the merveilleux-scientifique genre.

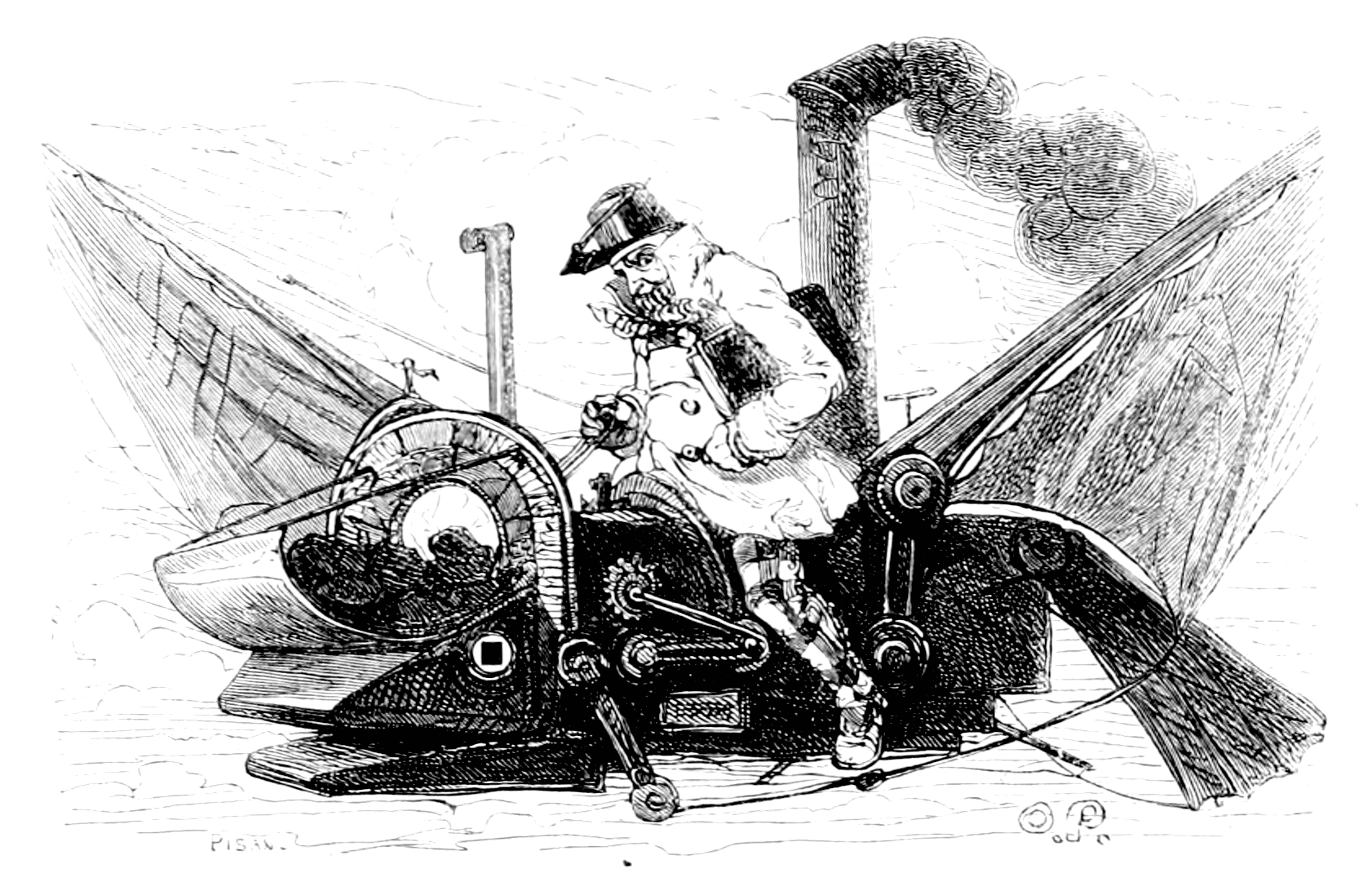
John Progrès, protector genius of modern times in Le Monde tel qu'il sera, a futuristic novel by Émile Souvestre (1846).

Although some authors, such as Rabelais, experimented with conjectural literature early on in their fictional careers, it wasn't until the 19th century that the genre really took off. In fact, as early as the end of the eighteenth century, Charles Georges Thomas Garnier began publishing his "Voyages imaginaires, songes, visions et romans cabalistiques" between 1787 and 1789, the first collection devoted to the literature of the imaginary. In its thirty-six volumes, the collection offers seventy-four conjectural tales on the themes of utopia, exploration and scientific anticipation.

In the 19th century, despite a short-lived attempt at structuring, literature of this kind remained scattered and diffusely published. In 1834, Félix Bodin attempted to catalogue all the inventions from which humans could benefit in Le Roman de l'avenir. The following year, Edgar Allan Poe published The Unparalleled Adventure of One Hans Pfaall, a journalistic hoax detailing a man's incredible journey to the Moon. In 1846, Émile Souvestre published Le Monde tel qu'il sera, an anticipation tale set in the year 3000. It is still considered a major work of dystopian literature. In 1854, C. I. Defontenay broke new ground in scientific fantasy literature with the publication of Star ou Ψ de Cassiopée. The novel included detailed descriptions of the habits and customs of an extraterrestrial civilization. However, this production does not establish a specific literary genre due to its scattered nature, as many novelists attribute such ramblings to the narrator's dreams or madness. Nonetheless, it has yet to establish itself.

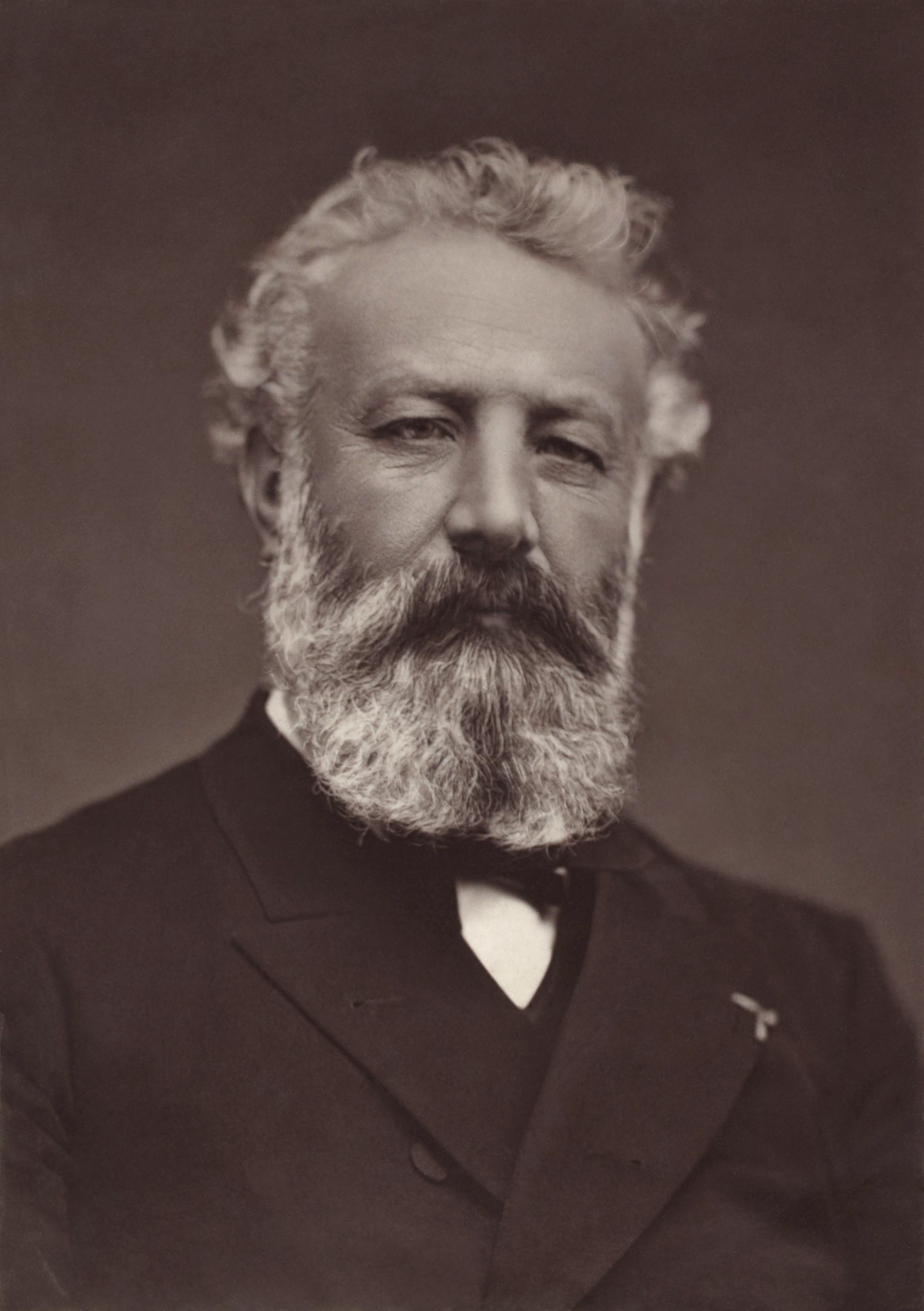
Jules Verne's novels popularized tales of scientific imagination.

This literature underwent a crucial shift with the release of Jules Verne's scientific novels, which played a key role in popularizing a new literary genre. As one of the pioneers of science fiction, Verne's impact on stories rooted in scientific imagination is profound - so much so that it eclipsed a whole emerging literary movement that was slowly coalescing around several writers. Nonetheless, during the rise of Vernian stories, the "merveilleux scientifique" genre emerged cautiously, coinciding with the progress of both sciences and pseudosciences. Likewise, from the 1880s onwards, psychiatric observations occupied a place in popular imagination. Indeed, the studies on hypnosis conducted by Doctors James Braid and Eugène Azam in the 1840s, followed by the research of Doctor Charcot in the latter part of the nineteenth century, revealed the mysteries of every individual, thereby transforming the once perceived supernatural phenomena into a natural occurrence and providing a rational explanation for the remarkable abilities manifested by convulsionaries or those possessed. This scientific community was enriched by notable researchers like Marie and Pierre Curie, Charles Richet, and Camille Flammarion. They systematically investigated unexplained phenomena by focusing on uncovering hidden worlds, long-range communication, and X-ray vision.

By the close of the 19th century, public opinion became more sensitive to scientific theories as practices previously regarded as outlandish sought validation as scientific disciplines, including phrenology, hypnotherapy, and fakirism. Technological advancements, such as the discovery of X-rays and endeavors to communicate with Mars, further contributed to this increasing sensitivity. These newly emerging scientific or pseudo-scientific developments have been prominently featured in publications such as Je sais tout and Lectures pour tous. These magazines consecutively published articles that disseminated and speculated about the future of science, accompanied by anticipatory short stories.

Pseudo-sciences and scientific progress provide loose inspiration for the genre

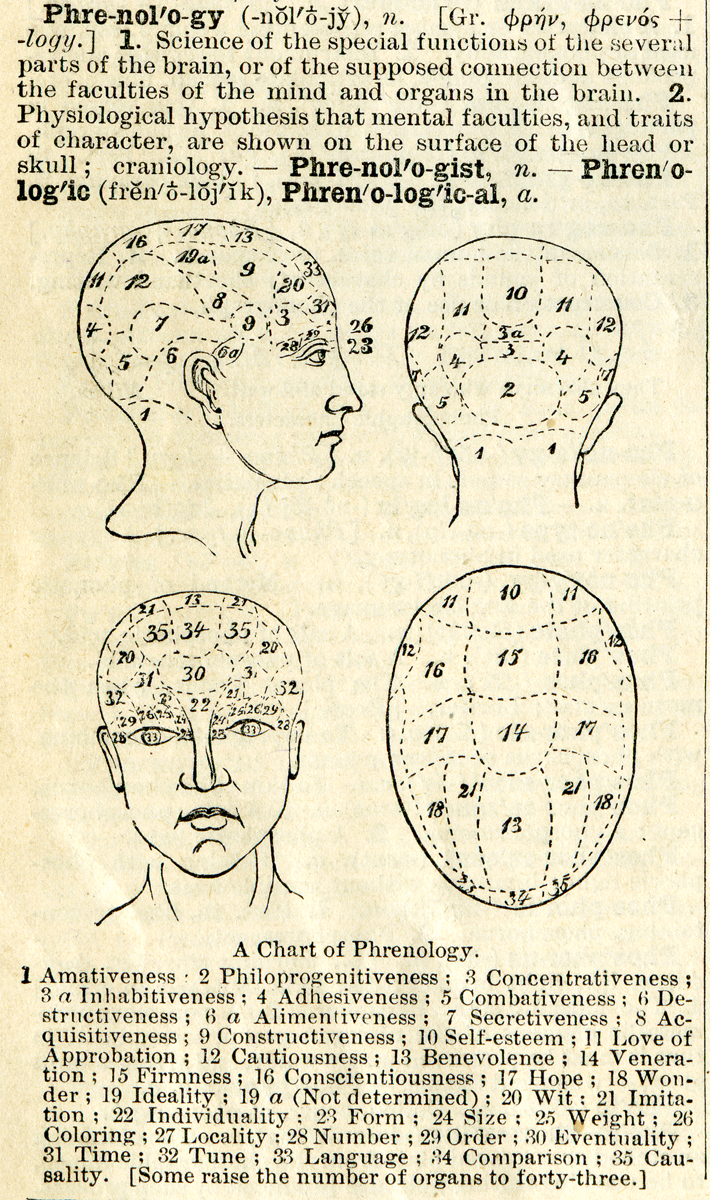
Phrenology, a pseudo-science fashionable in the 19th century.

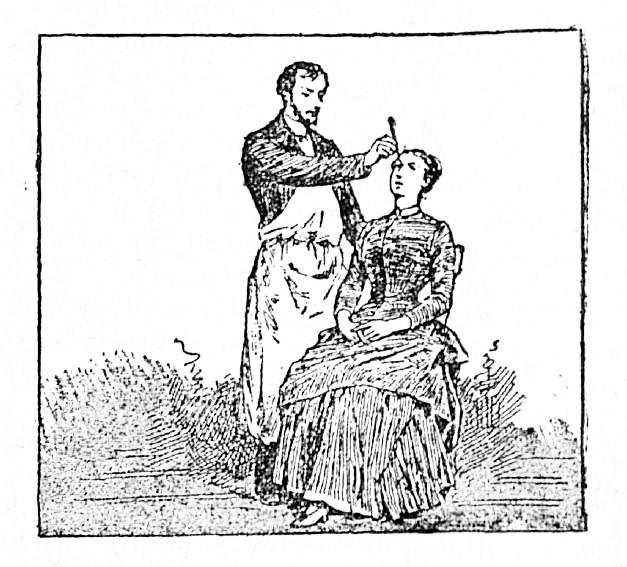
A hypnotherapy session.

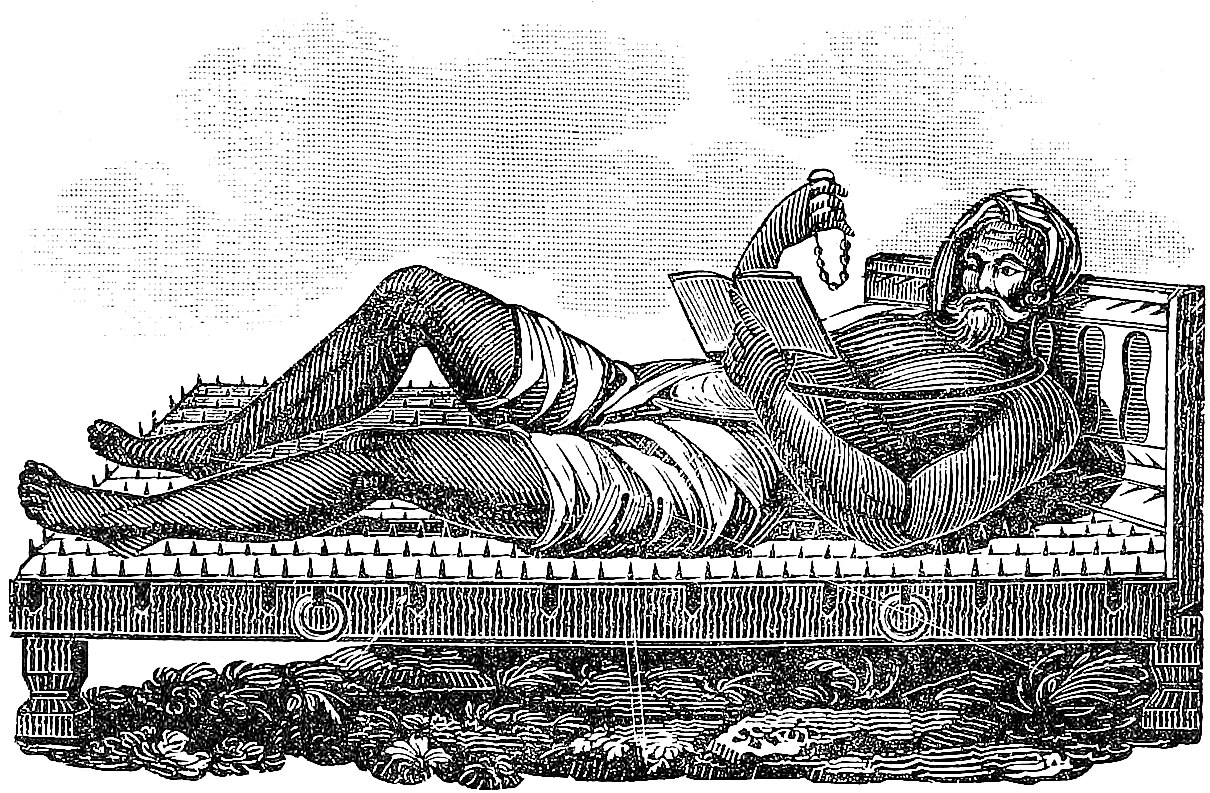
A fakir lying on a bed of nails.

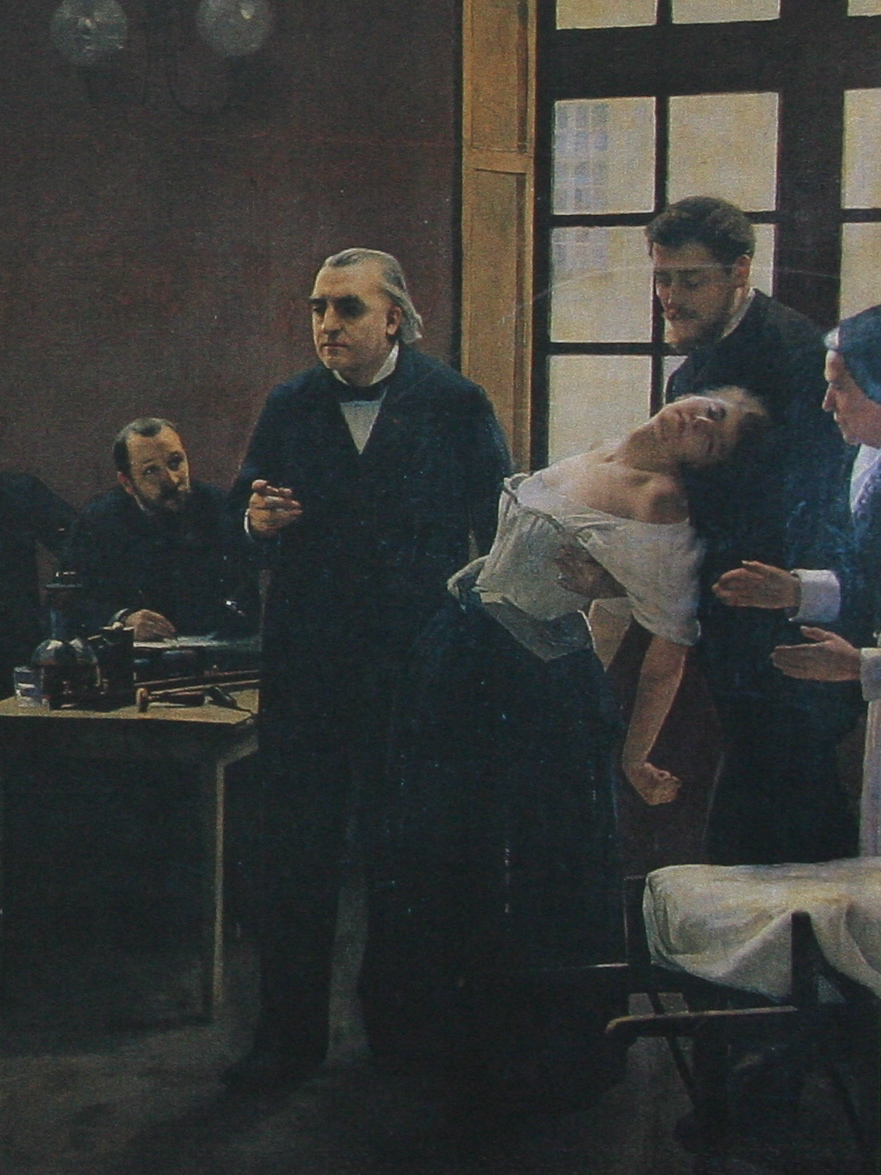
Charcot teaching a clinical lesson at the Salpêtrière.

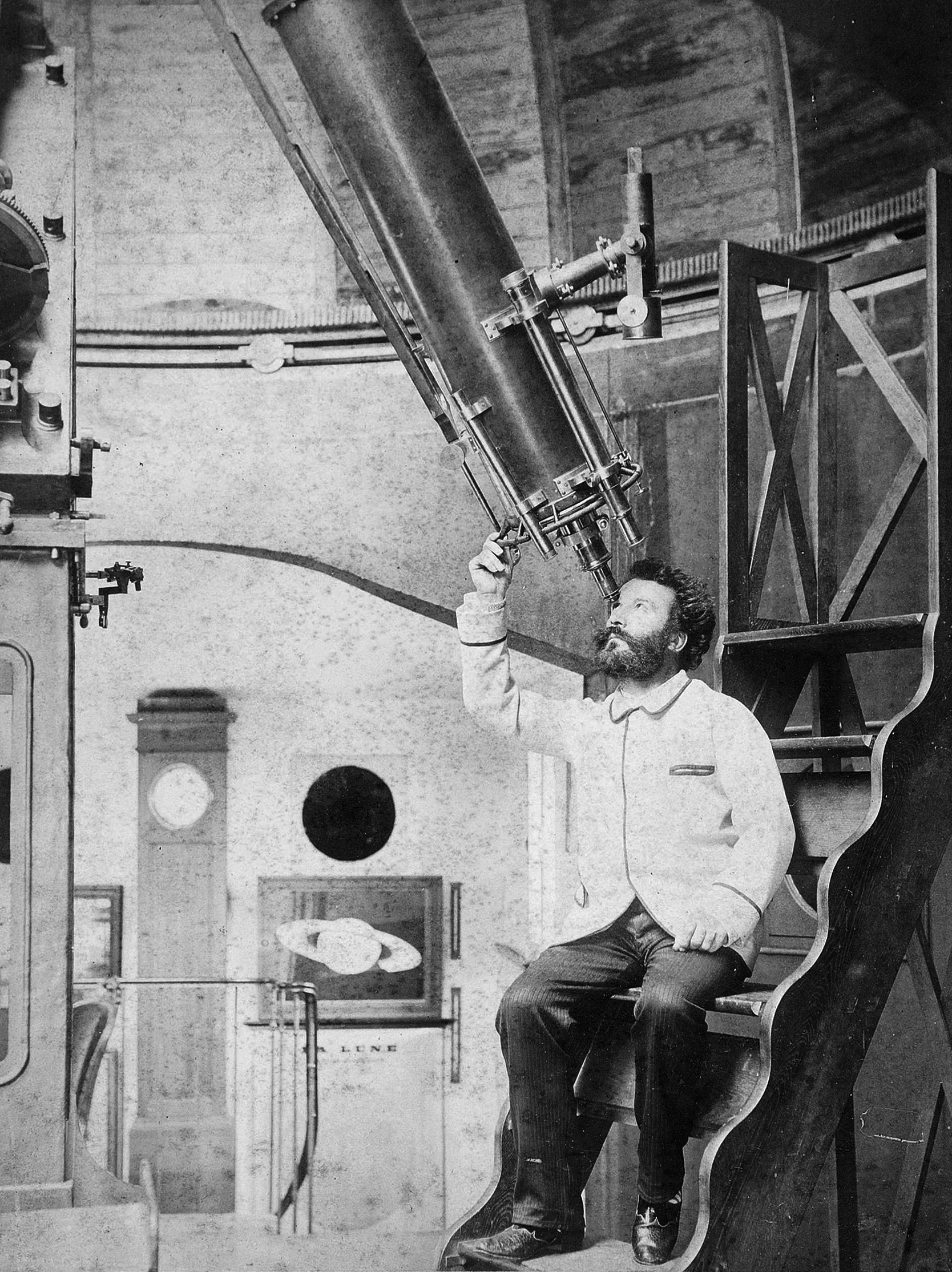
Camille Flammarion in his observatory.

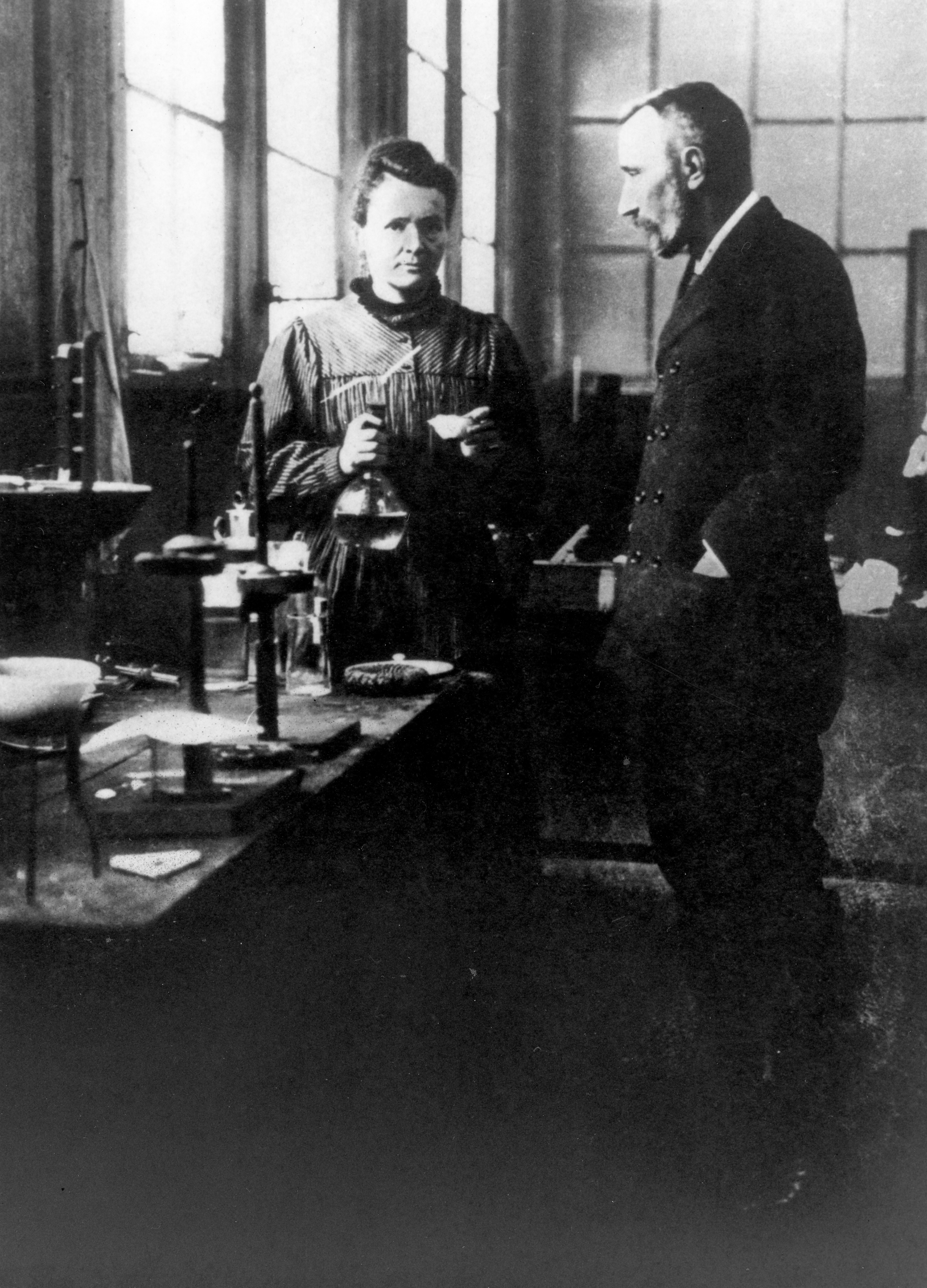
Pierre and Marie Curie in their laboratory.

The late 19th century witnessed a new generation of writers, such as J.-H. Rosny aîné, utilizing science and pseudoscience for purely fictional purposes. This marked a significant departure from their predecessors, who employed the conjectural element as a pretext, following in the footsteps of Savinian Cyrano de Bergerac's utopian, Jonathan Swift's satires, and Camille Flammarion's astronomical exposés.

== Definition ==
=== "Merveilleux scientifique", a literature of the imaginary with vaguely defined boundaries ===
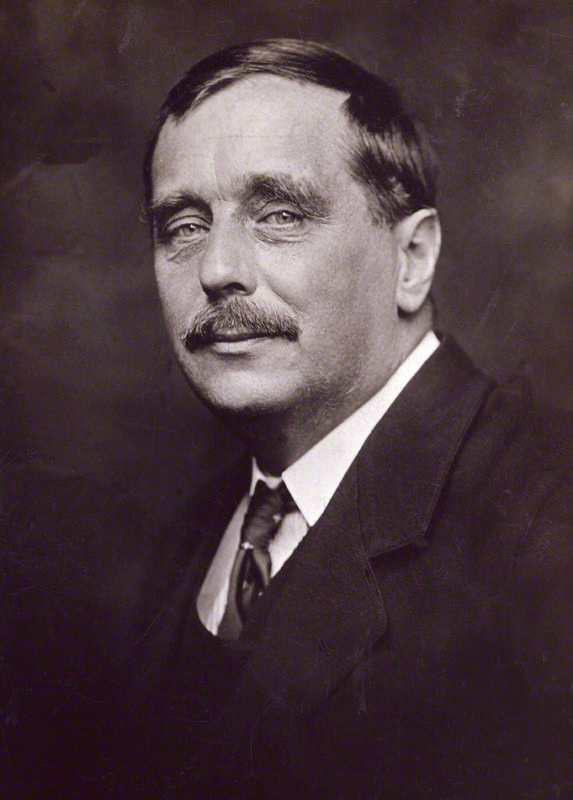
Prior to its appropriation by Maurice Renard, the term "merveilleux scientifique" was mainly used to refer to the work of H. G. Wells.

The term "merveilleux scientifique" was ambiguous before Maurice Renard's seminal manifesto. It had varying meanings. Literary critics coined this neologism in the 19th century to designate all works of fiction relating to science, whether they aimed to merge science and wonder or were generally scientific novels. In 1875, Louis Énault, a journalist, coined the term "merveilleux scientifique" to describe the plot of Victorien Sardou's La Perle noire which utilizes scientific explanations to justify unlikely events. Literary critic Charles Le Goffic associated the term with the scientific novels of Jules Verne in his study Les romanciers aujourd'hui (1890). The term "Wonder" was coined by Joseph-Pierre Durand, a physiologist, in his book "Le Merveilleux scientifique" in 1894 to describe the scientific study of phenomena that were once deemed marvelous.

However, during the early 20th century, literary critics primarily used the term to refer to H. G. Wells' novels. Marcel Réja, a psychiatrist, discussed this usage in his 1904 article published in "Le Mercure de France" titled "H.-G." It is plausible that Maurice Renard initially came across the term "merveilleux scientifique" in H. G. Wells' works. "The Concept of merveilleux scientifique in the Writings of Maurice Renard and its Origins in H. G. Wells". Comparing the scientific imagination of Wells and Jules Verne is a recurring theme among critics analyzing the intersection of science and imagination. When Renard published his groundbreaking article, scholars had already been intrigued by this new literary genre for years.

=== Theorizing a literary genre: the "Renardian merveilleux-scientifique novel" ===
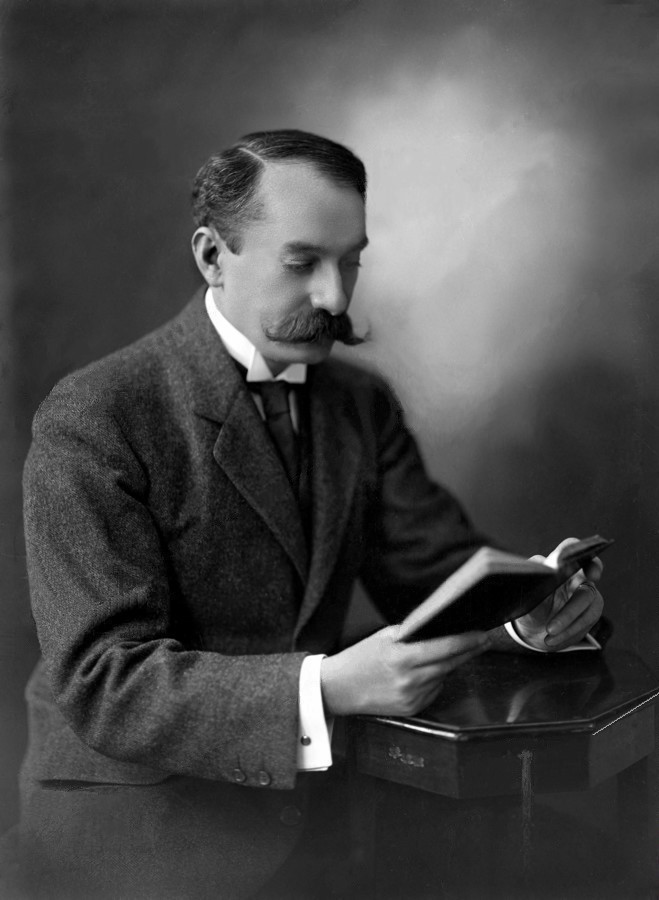
Between 1909 and 1928, writer Maurice Renard set about theorizing the concept of the merveilleux scientifique.

At the turn of the 20th century, the term "merveilleux scientifique" held various connotations until Maurice Renard redefined the phrase in 1909. Follow conventional academic structures including regular author and institution formatting, while using clear, objective language with a passive tone, avoiding personal perspectives and hedging. Additionally, maintain formal register, precise word choice, and grammatical correctness while using consistent citation and avoiding filler words. He outlined his literary agenda in three articles, notably "Du roman merveilleux-scientifique et de son action sur l'intelligence du progrès," which debuted in Le Spectateur during October 1909, and "Le Merveilleux scientifique et La Force mystérieuse de J.-H." Rosny aine was published in La Vie in June 1914 and "Le roman d'hypothese" was published in the magazine ABC in 1928. (Note: Alongside these three main articles, which seek to institutionalize the genre, the writer completes and evolves his thinking with "Two Observations on the Audience. "Mr. Orville Wright..." - Le canard attraction" in Le Spectateur no. 31, January 1912; "Depuis Sinbad" in L'Ami du livre, June 1923; and "Anticipations" in Paris-Soir no. 580, May 1925.) The writer's literary career showcased evolution in not only the definition of the genre but also its name, thereby complicating the understanding of the term "merveilleux scientifique."

==== The 1909 Manifesto ====
The merveilleux-scientifique novel is fiction whose basis is a sophism; whose object is to lead the reader to a contemplation of the universe closer to the truth; whose means is the application of scientific methods to the comprehensive study of the unknown and the uncertain.

— Maurice Renard

In the 19th century, literary critics pondered the future of fantastique stories. Maurice Renard believed that the gradual disappearance of the supernatural due to scientific advances required a renewal of fantasy. Therefore, writers must use science to create and explore new forms of the marvelous in the face of this disenchantment with the world. In 1909, the writer released a manifesto titled "Du roman merveilleux-scientifique et de son action sur l'intelligence du progrès." The manifesto aimed to establish the existence of a novelistic genre with autonomy and literary value within the critical field. In this article, the author establishes compositional rules for rational novelistic conjecture and introduces the concept of "merveilleux scientifique," previously applied to certain works by writers such as H. G. Wells, J.-H. Rosny aîné, and Jules Verne. However, the author does not simply acknowledge the existence of the "merveilleux scientifique" theme but rather strictly defines and elevates it to a distinct literary genre. In his opinion, the change in status justifies a new syntax, specifically, including a hyphen between the two words, which incidentally changes the noun into an adjective.

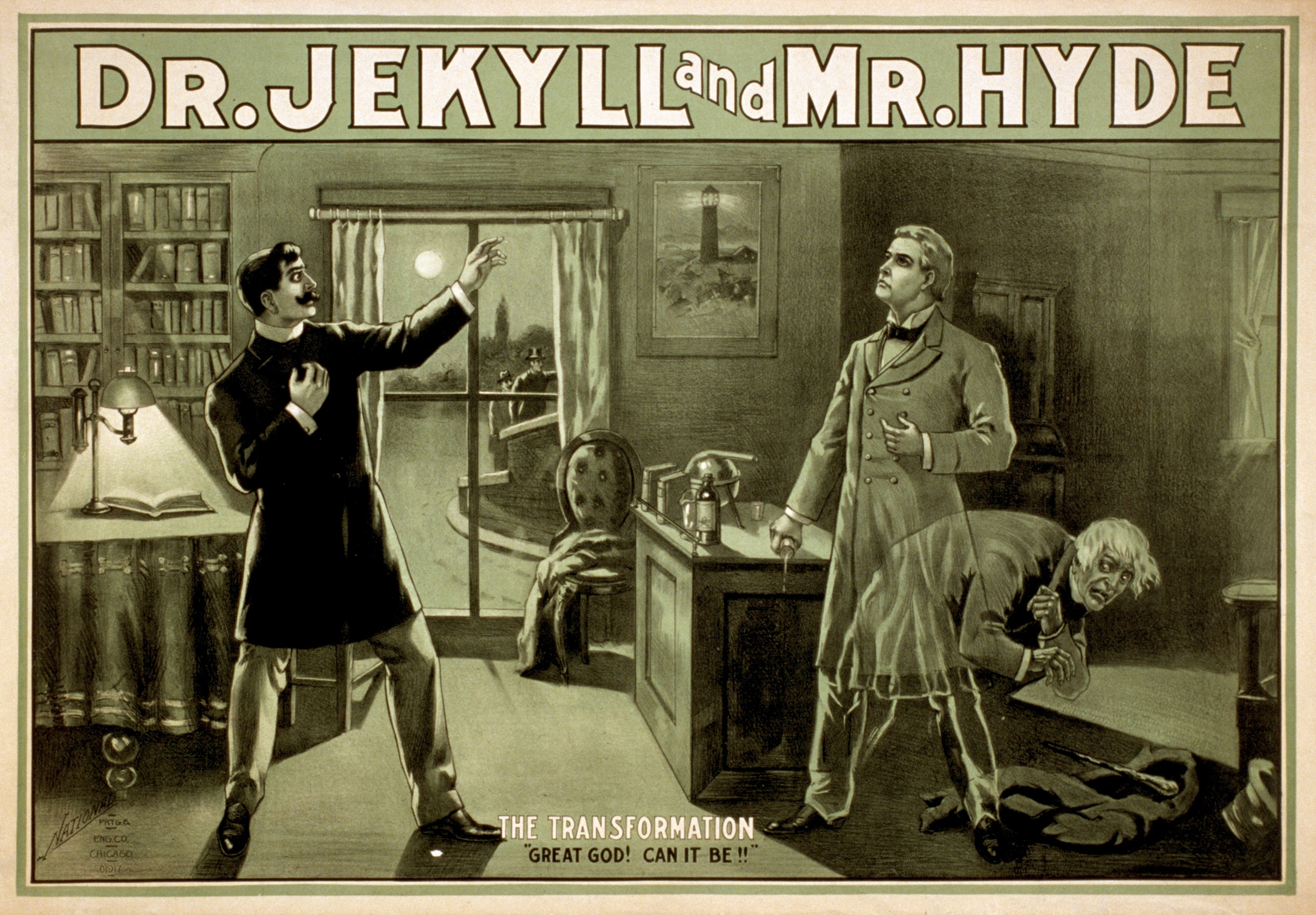
According to Maurice Renard, proponents of the merveilleux-scientifique genre need to follow the same approach as Robert Louis Stevenson, with his novel The Strange Case of Dr. Jekyll and Mr. Hyde, published in 1886.

Maurice Renard defines the merveilleux-scientifique novel as a literary genre in which science is utilized as a disruptive element as opposed to a mere setting. The plot follows a rational framework while a scientific law, be it physical, chemical, psychic or biological, is altered or discovered. Then, the novelist must envision all potential ramifications. Furthermore, Renard implores his colleagues to venture into the unknown realms of science, creating a vertiginous experience for the reader. Defined as a "scholarly structured story", the merveilleux-scientifique novel aims to encourage readers to question themselves and view the world from a different perspective. Inspired by the naturalist novel of Émile Zola, it serves as a laboratory of ideas, observing how the environment affects the characters. Furthermore, since the legitimacy of the genre stems from its philosophical scope, Maurice Renard chose to publish his article in Le Spectateur - a critical and philosophical journal - instead of a literary review.

Renard aimed to establish a literary movement around the genre through his manifesto. He first establishes himself in a genre that is well known to critics by claiming renowned fantasy authors. First and foremost, this work honors Edgar Poe for his establishment of the merveilleux-scientifique novel at its purest level, (Note: "Edgar Poe, with only two tales, The Truth about the Case of Mr. Valdemar and Recollections of Mr. August Bedloe, founded the pure merveilleux-scientifique novel.") and then H. G. Wells for expanding the genre through the profusion of his works. Along with the two genre founders, Maurice Renard lists Auguste de Villiers de L'Isle-Adam, Robert Louis Stevenson, and Charles Derennes as the creators of this new genre, through their respective works The Future Eve (1886), Strange Case of Dr Jekyll and Mr Hyde (1886), and Le Peuple du Pôle (1907).

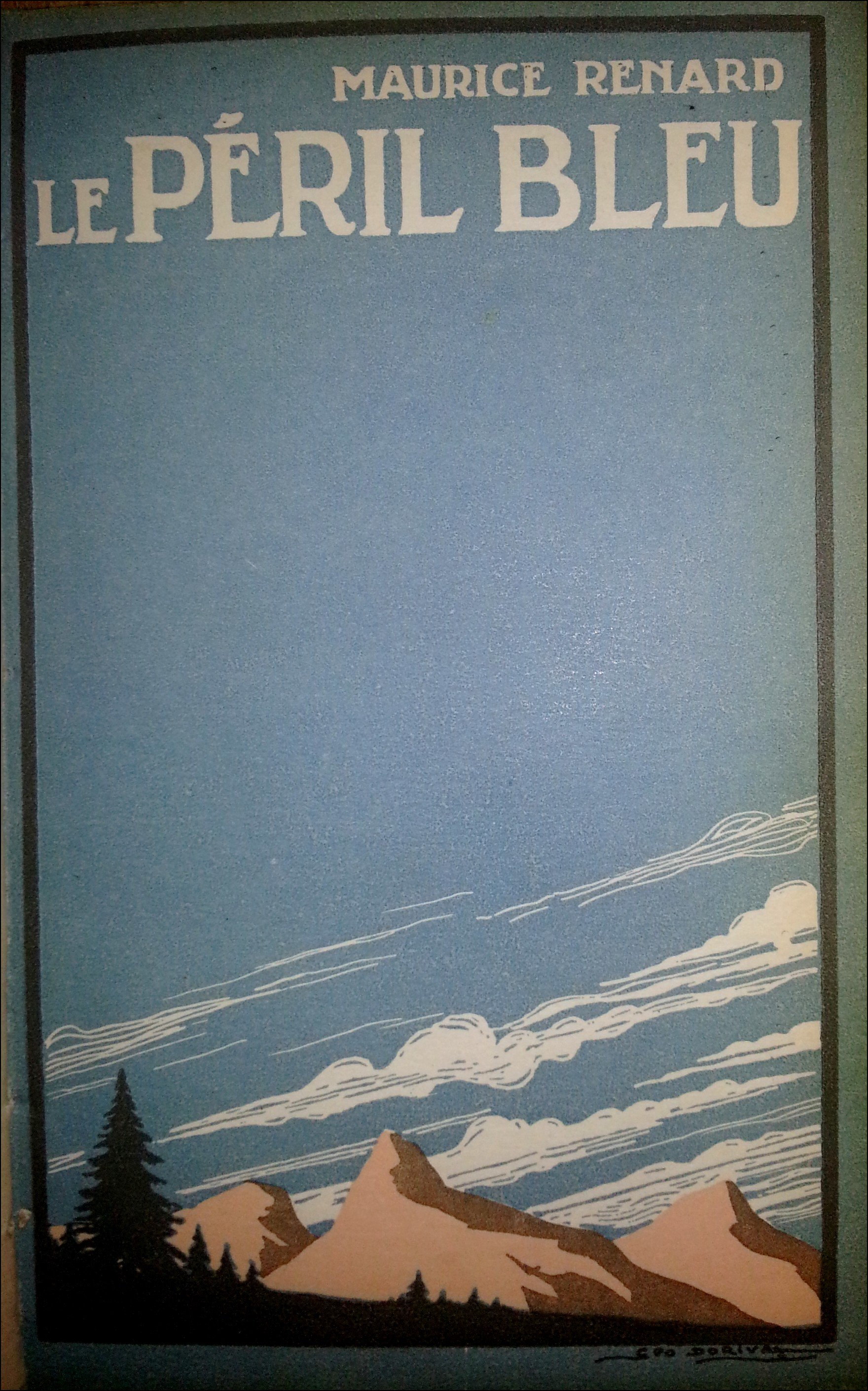
Maurice Renard's 1909 manifesto was republished as a preface to The Blue Peril in 1911, ensuring its posterity.

Maurice Renard defines the merveilleux-scientifique novel in opposition to specific works from which he chooses to distance himself. He categorically rejects Jules Verne, accused of contributing to pigeonholing the scientific novel as literature for young people, a publishing sector far removed from the intellectual demands Renard aimed to meet. Moreover, Verne is also accused of either popularizing science or extrapolating from reality, while Renard sought to break with reality. Indeed, Jules Verne's focus on writing scientifically plausible novels sets him apart from Renard's theory of imagining science in unknown territories. Verne also refrains from endorsing the educational adventure stories of André Laurie and Paul d'Ivoi, or Albert Robida's humorous anticipations that hold a satirical purpose. The purpose of the merveilleux-scientifique story differs from that of anticipation. While anticipation is satisfied with placing the storyline in the future, merveilleux-scientifique novels envision the outcomes of modern or future innovations. Maurice Renard constructs his plots through the same intellectual means commonly applied in scientific activities, yet they remain rooted in an imaginative, fictional science.

The manifesto made a significant impact. After its initial release, critics Edmond Pilon and Henry Durand-Davray reaffirmed Renard's article, though it was predominantly its reissue two years later as a preface to The Blue Peril that secured its longevity. In 1915, Hubert Matthey published Essai sur le merveilleux dans la littérature française depuis 1800, wherein he frequently alluded to the 1909 manifesto. The term was discussed by critics until 1940, whether in an obituary of Rosny aîné or in the writings of representatives of the genre and its defenders, including Gaston de Pawlowski and André Maurois. During the 1910s and 1920s, two opposing factions emerged. On one hand, there were the advocates of the merveilleux-scientifique novel, who were actually a small group of Maurice Renard's acquaintances. Charles Derennes, Jean Ray, Rosny aîné, Albert Dubeux, and Georges de la Fouchardière lavished praise on the writer. However, critics were generally either disinterested or harsh, viewing the genre as populist literature or "childish entertainment." This is exemplified by Jacques Copeau's scathing attack in a 1912 article published in La Nouvelle Revue Française.

==== Evolution of the term: from the "merveilleux-scientifique novel" to the "novel of hypothesis" ====
The term "roman merveilleux-scientifique" was developed by Maurice Renard between 1909 and 1928 to earn acknowledgment and prevent the extinction of the genre. The predicament persisted in differentiating the novel from Jules Verne, whose literary style still eclipsed all scientific imaginative literature. Gradually, the lack of success in establishing a literary movement was evident in the author's frustrated tone, especially in the 1923 article "Since Sinbad". However, his comments' sharpness was diminished in "Le roman d'hypothèse," a disillusioned text in which he seemed to have abandoned his literary objectives. After 1928, he refrained from publishing critical articles, and his literary output in this category was minimal: Le Maître de la lumière (1933) and the narrative L'an 2000 (1938).

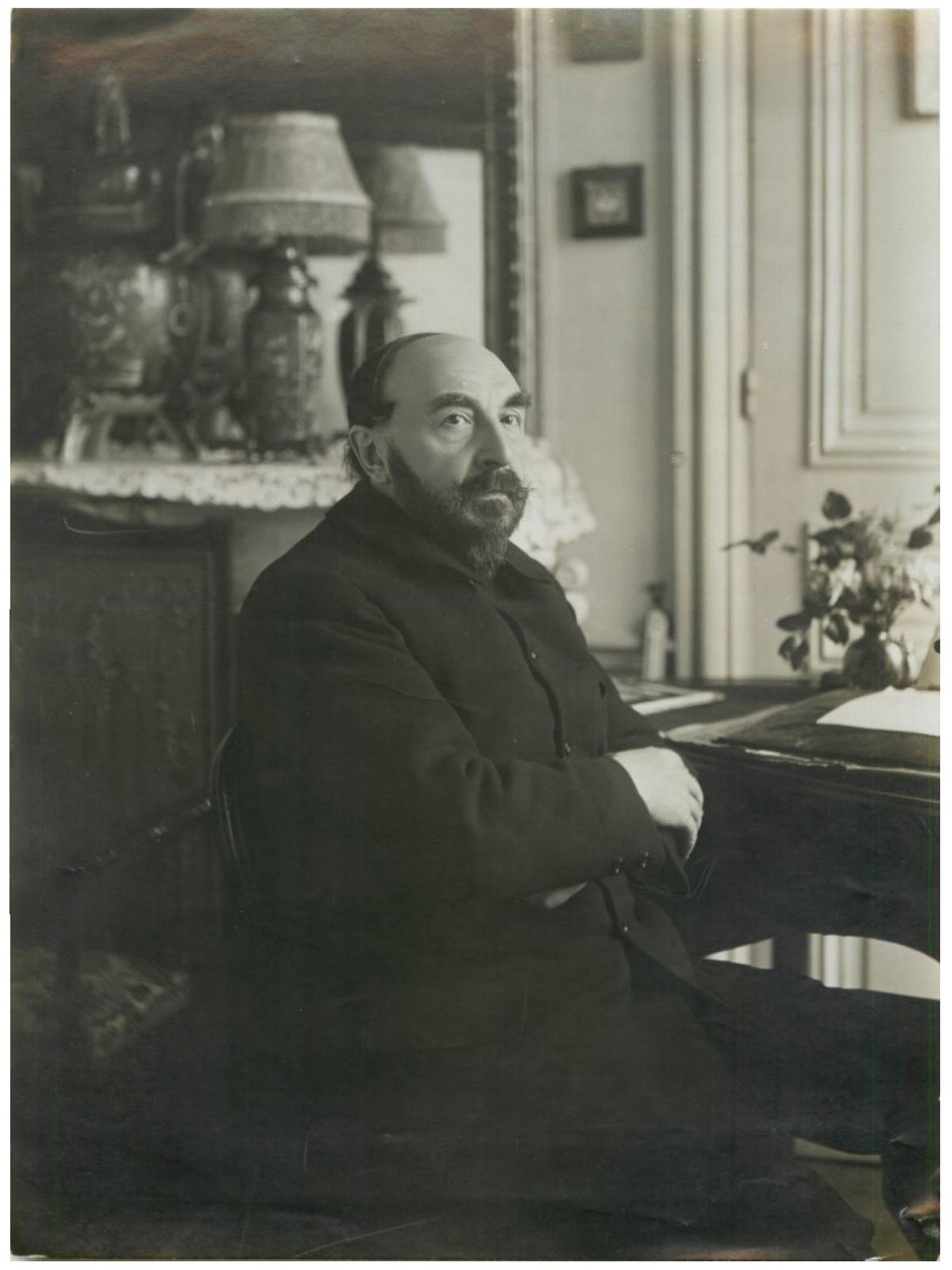
In 1914, Maurice Renard added J.-H. Rosny aîné to the list of writers of merveilleux-scientifique novels with the release of La Force mystérieuse.

In 1914, Maurice Renard reviewed Rosny aîné's La Force mystérieuse and used it as an opportunity to develop his own concepts on the merveilleux-scientifique novel. He published this work under his name. The theorist changed his pen name to counter criticism of the genre, which accused it of relying too heavily on fantasy at the expense of scientific rigor. As early as 1908, the writer used the term "conte à structure savante" to refer to these literary goals. However, in 1923's "Depuis Sinbad", they rejected "merveilleux-scientifique" in favor of "parascientifique" to better reflect scientific mysteries. Five years later, the writer's eponymous article "The Novel of Hypothesis" renamed the genre once again, emphasizing its epistemological value. With his new expression, Renard aimed to demonstrate that exploring the unknown could offer fresh insights into reality. However, the impact of these lexical changes was restricted, since the phrase "roman merveilleux-scientifique" had already established itself (Note: In particular, critic Jean Morel helped establish the term with his article "J.-H. Rosny aîné et le merveilleux scientifique", published in Le Mercure de France in 1926.) - even if literary critics frequently employed it in a different way to Renard's definition.

Alongside the onomastic adjustment, Maurice Renard also revised the list of writers within the genre. In 1914, Rosny aine joined the ranking, and Charles Derennes, who had not produced anything since Le Peuple du Pôle, was removed. Once merveilleux scientifique was recognized as a separate genre by critics, it became unnecessary for theorists to defend its purity by excluding authors who introduced sociological or satirical aspects. As the articles progress, Renard demonstrates greater flexibility regarding the use of merveilleux scientifique, recognizing that the genre can serve as a means to an end beyond its own aesthetic purpose. The novelist skillfully interweaves other generic codes, such as through the incorporation of detective plots in "The Blue Peril" (1911) and satire in "Un homme chez les microbes" (1928).

Throughout his career, Maurice Renard endeavored to perpetuate the merveilleux-scientifique genre even if it required an easing of its theoretical constraints. For a decade, he established the Maurice Renard prize for a novel of scientific imagination with the objective of legitimizing the genre. From 1922 to 1932, the prize was awarded to ten authors, including Marcel Roland and Alexandre Arnoux. However, their works primarily focused on anticipation and utopia, rendering the nominations a testament to the relaxation of the 1909 manifesto. (Note: After the winner of the 1932 prize, Serge-Simon Held, refused his award so as not to jeopardize his chances of winning the Goncourt, Maurice Renard decided to put an end to the literary prize.)

== Popular literature ==
The merveilleux-scientifique genre emerged in France at the end of the 19th century and thrived until the 1930s, gradually declining in the 1950s. While Maurice Renard's articles were influential, merveilleux-scientifique novels are still considered popular literature due to the themes they explore and their publication media.

=== A generation of writers in love with scientific conjecture ===
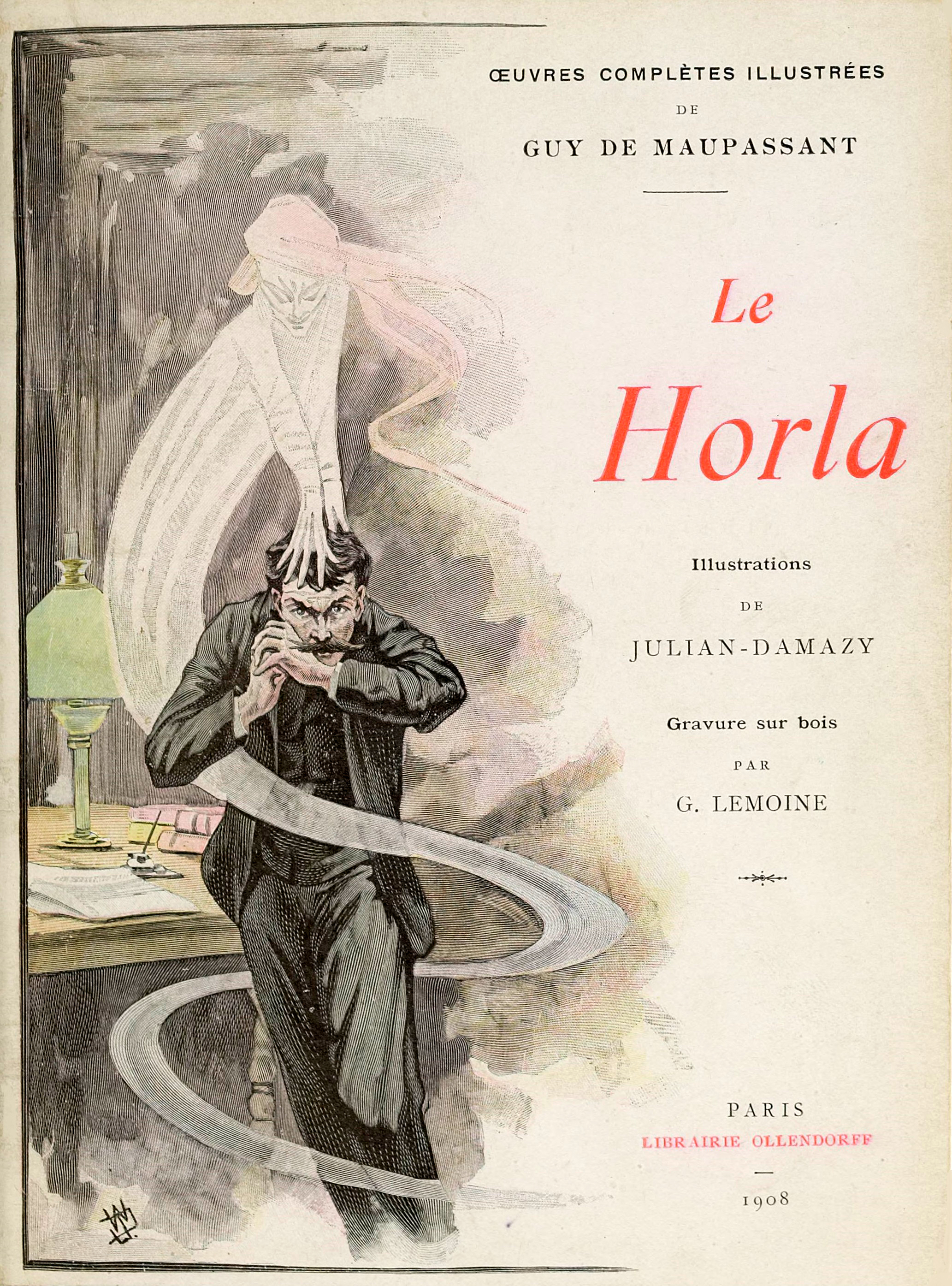
Guy de Maupassant's The Horla is a merveilleux-scientifique tale before its time.

With his short story "The Horla," Guy de Maupassant published a text ahead of its time that blended the fantastic and scientific approaches. The author narrates the loss of bearings experienced by an individual suffering from the presence of an invisible being in their environment. This 1886 story significantly influenced authors of the merveilleux-scientifique movement, incorporating science, pseudo-science, and spiritualism.

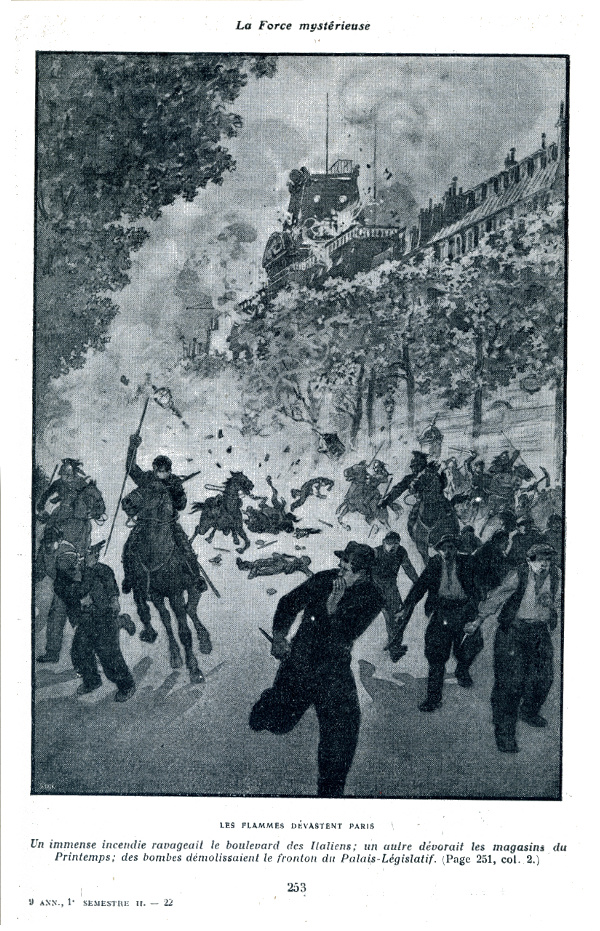
In La Force mystérieuse, Rosny aîné depicts an immense cataclysm that overturns the entire human race.

Nevertheless, the merveilleux scientifique genre appeared to thrive in 1887, when Rosny aîné published the short novel Les Xipéhuz, which details an encounter between humans and a non-organic intelligence from distant prehistory. Prior to this, merveilleux-scientifique stories had been published unobtrusively. However, this distinctive text achieved great literary success, increasing publicity for the genre. A versatile author, Rosny aîné created non-anthropocentric narratives where humans are depicted as a modest part of a larger cosmic entity, rather than as an end in themselves. Specifically, his work follows an extensive "war of the kingdoms," from the triumphant emergence of our species in prehistoric times to the eventual replacement of Homo sapiens by another life form that dominates the Earth's surface in the distant future. Thus, in Les Xipéhuz, Rosny aîné presents a confrontation between primitive humanity and an unfamiliar race, and in La Force mystérieuse (1913), he envisions a modern cataclysm that intensifies, compelling humankind to implement social reorganization. The author achieved massive commercial success with these novels, placing him at the forefront of the merveilleux-scientifique movement among his peers and critics to this day.

Selected to join the youthful Goncourt literary society together with his brother J.-H. Rosny jeune, he was among the individuals who granted the primary Prix Goncourt to a novel of the merveilleux scientifique: Force ennemie by Franco-American writer John-Antoine Nau, which was published in 1903. The novel centers on the subject of space travel through mental projection, in which an extraterrestrial lodges in the narrator's mind while exploring a potential invasion. Two years later, the Prix Goncourt was awarded to Les Civilisés, a speculative novel by Claude Farrère that envisions a future conflict between France and Great Britain.

Around the same time, the literary works of H. G. Wells also gained popularity, with regular reviews in the French press. Under the inspiration of several French authors, the genre acquired credibility in literature concurrently with Maurice Renard's theorization of it as the merveilleux-scientifique genre. For the writer, this pursuit of credibility was a genuine challenge, given that it was a genre he authored himself. His numerous novels embrace popular scientific imagination themes, beginning with a fundamental premise that he exhaustively explores. For instance, the author presents extreme human transplants in Le Docteur Lerne, sous-dieu, an invisible community coexisting with humanity in The Blue Peril, a man possessing enhanced vision in L'Homme truqué, and a machine able to replicate objects and bodies in Le Singe.

In the realm of Wells' literature, Rosny aîné and Maurice Renard emerge as the pioneers of an up-and-coming literary genre despite not being widely recognized by the public. Nevertheless, the genre distinguishes itself by providing readers with sensational and extraordinary experiences, limited only by the author's imagination. These experiences include scenarios such as the Eiffel Tower theft, various invasions, and even apocalyptic endings.

In 1908, Jean de La Hire released [[La Roue fulgurante]]. The novel tells the story of a group of Earthlings who are abducted by a spaceship and transported to Mercury and Venus. This widely popular work solidified La Hire's position as a prominent figure in pre-war French science fiction. Converted to profitable popular literature, he further explored the realm of merveilleux scientifique with his successful series featuring the adventures of Léo Saint-Clair le Nyctalope. Additionally, he delved into children's literature with Les Trois Boy-scouts and Les Grandes aventures d'un boy-scout.

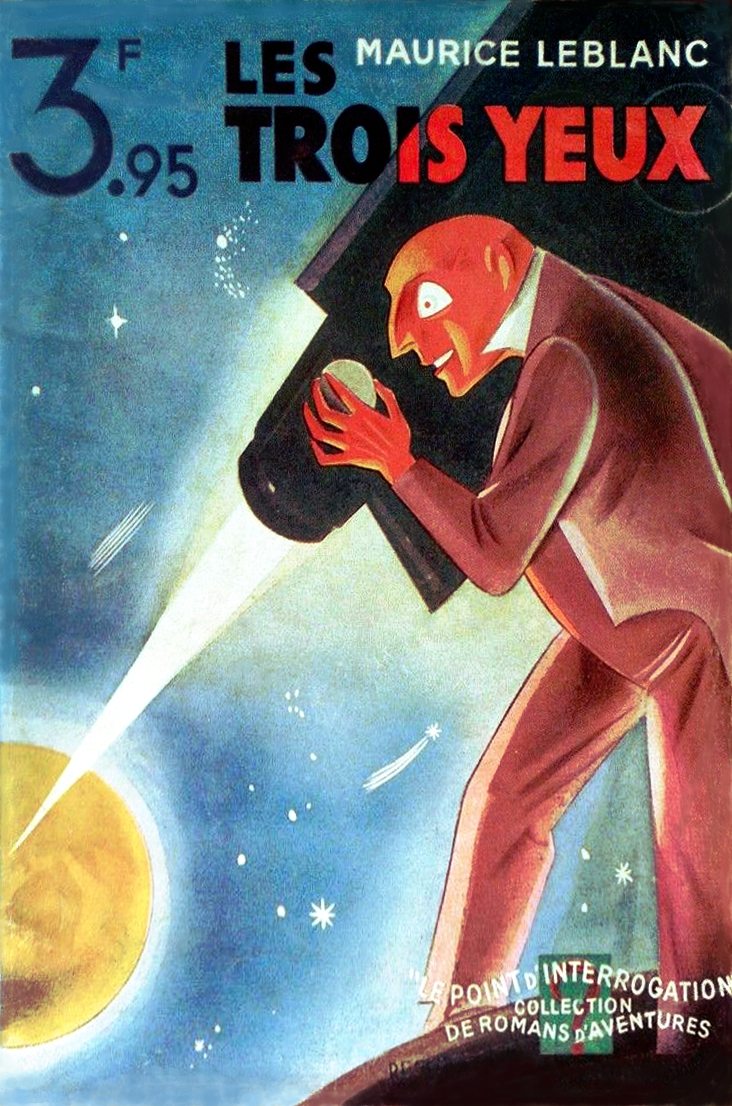
Best known for the adventures of gentleman burglar Arsène Lupin, Maurice Leblanc also tried his hand at the merveilleux scientifique with Les Trois Yeux.

Popular enthusiasm for new scientific and pseudo-scientific theories was embraced by authors and subsequently translated into adventure novels. Objective evaluations of theories were prioritized in these works. Non-scientist writers of merveilleux-scientifique tales, such as doctors André Couvreur and Octave Béliard, drew inspiration from popular science magazines. At the close of the 19th century, Percival Lowell, an American businessman and amateur astronomer, fervently argued for the presence of canals on Mars. This idea of a Martian civilization captivated French novelists, further popularizing Lowell's theories. Despite not believing in the existence of such canals, French astronomer Camille Flammarion shared in the belief that life existed on Mars. In 1889, the novel Uranie was published, which describes the journey of an astronomer through the stars, with Mars as one of the stages.

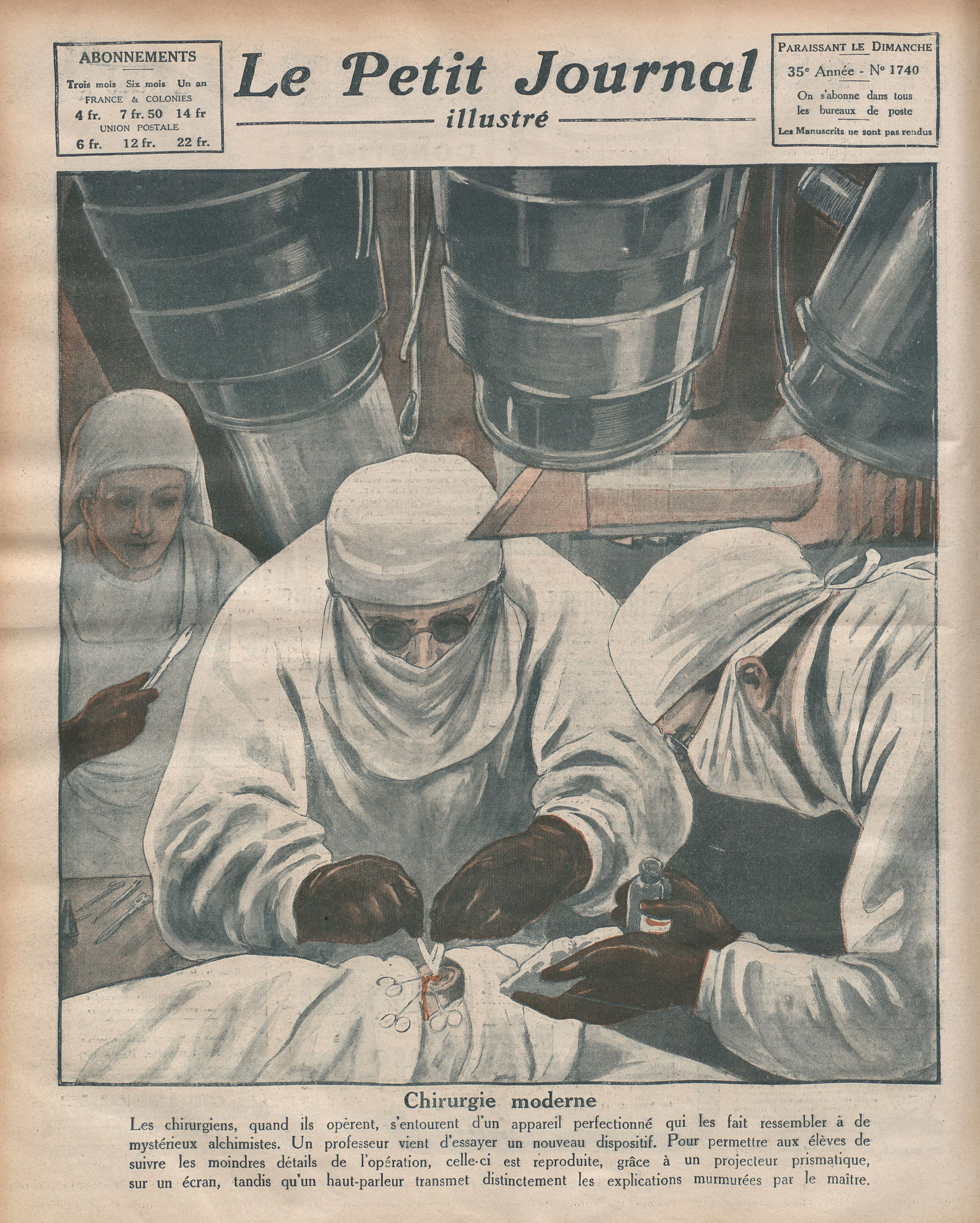
Cover of Le Petit Journal comparing the appearance of surgeons to that of "mysterious alchemists" (27 April 1924)

By the end of the 19th century, scientific progress was predominantly viewed as advantageous. However, with subsequent conflicts and wars, this perspective shifted, and the association between scientific advancements and humanity's destructive tendencies became prevalent. Driven by this shift, the figure of the Machiavellian scientist, such as Gustave Le Rouge's Le Mystérieux Docteur Cornélius (1912-1913), gained popularity. The practitioner is a leader of an underground criminal organization who conducts "carnoplasty" experiments, meaning the modification of human bodies, under the influence of Alexis Carrel's pioneering research on organ transplantation. The outbreak of World War I marked a significant turning point in the innovation of scientific breakthroughs. While writers in the United States, a country relatively spared from the horrors of war, continued to explore science as progress for mankind, European - and particularly French - disillusionment with beneficent science significantly darkened the genre's themes, ultimately becoming essentially pessimistic. Furthermore, during the post-war era, writers of science fiction seemed to have lost their connection to technological advancements (such as astronautical testing, research into nuclear physics, and quantum mechanics) despite their previous close following of scientific research. Instead, they relied on nostalgic themes such as the end of the world, lost worlds, and evil mad scientists to construct their plots.

Contemporary critics generally consider merveilleux scientifique a minor genre with vague and imprecise forms. However, this literature has influenced the evolution of the popular genre, encouraging major authors such as Maurice Leblanc, Guy de Téramond, Gaston Leroux, Octave Béliard, Léon Groc, Gustave Le Rouge, and Jacques Spitz to indulge in it. Indeed, this literature is widely accepted within the official culture, provided that its authors also belong to literary circles. Their works are presented as thematic variations of traditional genres, such as utopia or the philosophical tale, and reviewed by the same literary critics as conventional literature. For instance, Maurice Leblanc recounts in Les Trois Yeux (1919) the experience of a scientist who develops a B-ray-treated coating allowing past images to appear on a wall, as during a cinematograph session. Similarly, in La Poupée sanglante (1923), Gaston Leroux incorporates the themes of automata, human transplants, and vampirism within a scientific framework.

=== The favourite themes of merveilleux scientifique ===
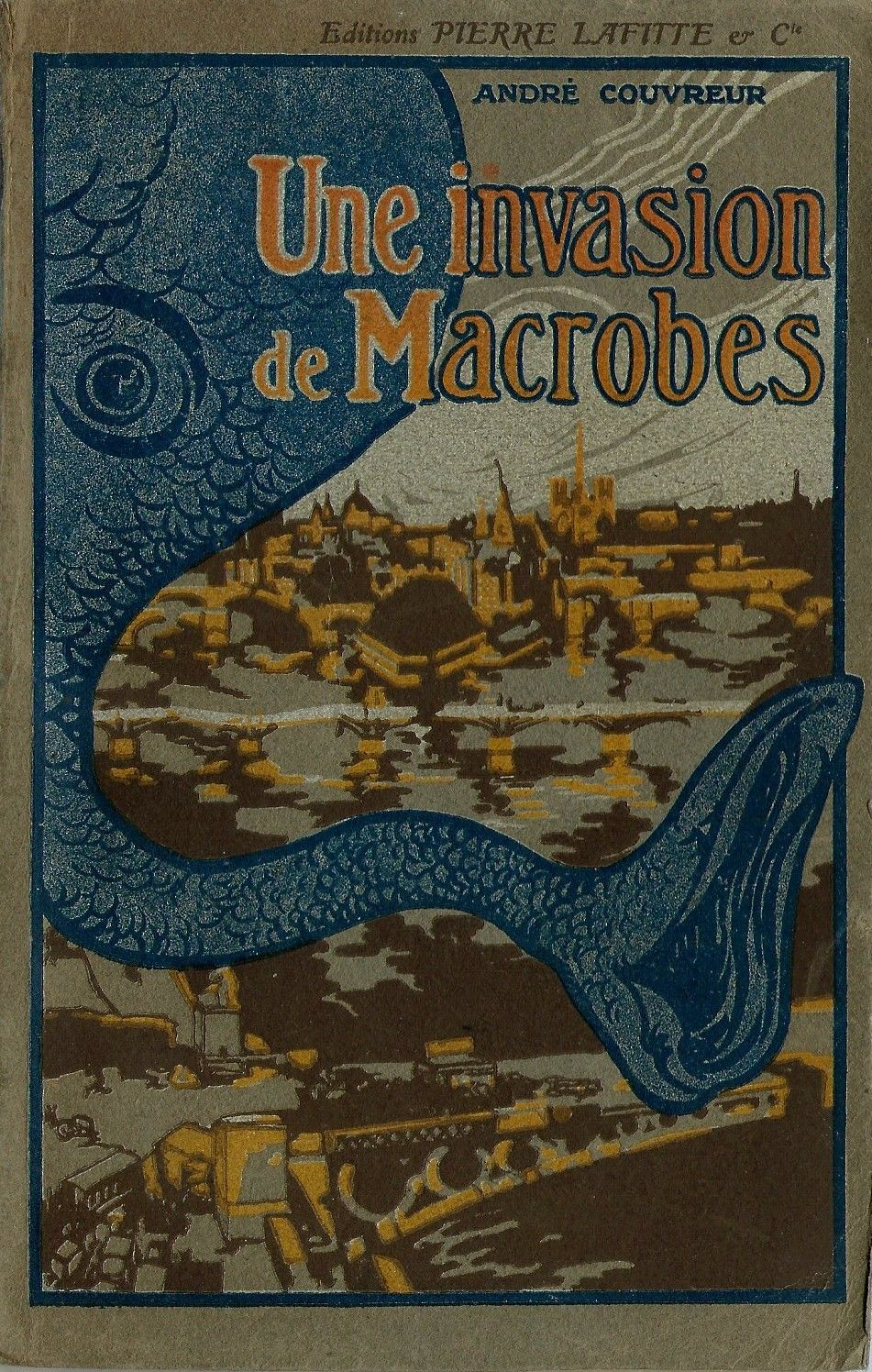
In the early 20th century, science made it possible to dramatically increase the size of microbes. Professeur Tornada, a mad scientist in his own right, literally carries out the experiment. Cover of André Couvreur's novel Une Invasion de macrobes, published in 1910 by Éditions Pierre Lafitte.

The merveilleux-scientifique genre, as defined by Maurice Renard, takes as its starting point an alteration of a scientific law, whose consequences the author must imagine. The proponents of this genre are interested not only in pseudosciences considered as deception, such as levitation, metagnomy, metempsychosis, and telepathy, but also in future discoveries such as time travel, miniaturization of beings, and carnoplasty. That is why researchers and engineers, who initiate discoveries and the consequent adventures, are the preferred characters in captivating scientific novels.

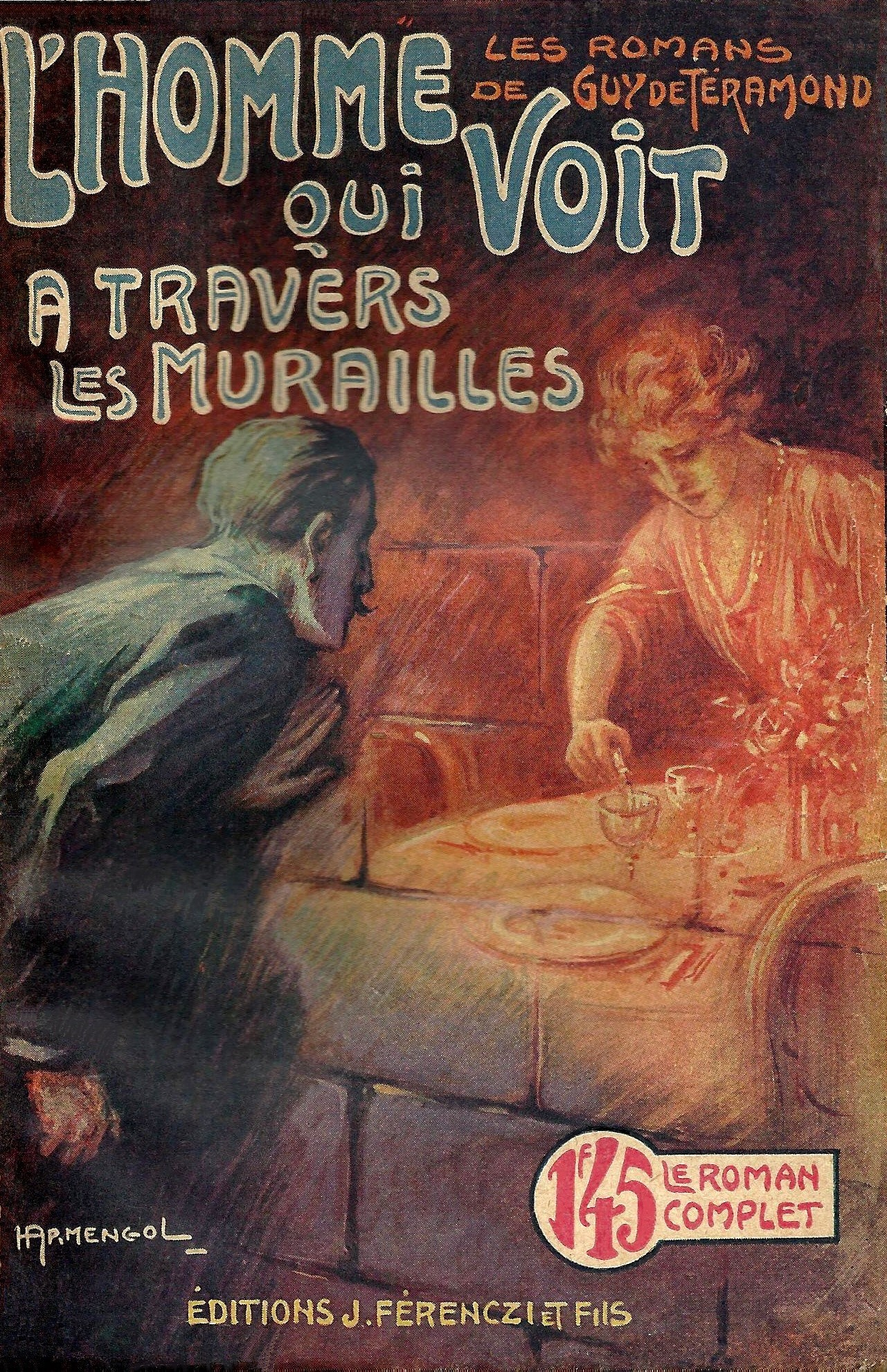
In 1913, Guy de Téramond imagines a man with X-ray vision after a minor operation. Cover of L'Homme qui voit à travers les murailles drawn by Henri Armengol.

Biological laws are a subject of modification for researchers. This renders the human body as a malleable substance for well-intentioned or not so well-intentioned scientists to work with. The themes of invisibility, mutation, immortality, and the superman were common in Jean de La Hire's nineteen novels about the Nyctalope's adventures. The Nyctalope is a man with augmented vision and an artificial heart, while the Hictaner is a man hybridized with a shark in L'Homme qui peut vivre dans l'eau (1910). Louis Boussenard took inspiration from H. G. Wells' The Invisible Man to write Monsieur... Rien! (1907), a nihilist steals the chemical process that allows him to become invisible in order to assassinate Russian dignitaries.

Authors of merveilleux scientifique systematically seek analogies between scientific phenomena, exploring new facets of augmented humanity. For instance, Maurice Renard's L'Homme au corps subtil (1913) depicts the ability of Professor Bouvancourt to traverse matter using the penetrating power of X-rays on the human body, echoing François Dutilleul's capabilities from Marcel Aymé's Le Passe-Muraille (1941). In "Un homme chez les microbes" (1928), Renard utilizes the character of a talented scientist to depict the journey of Fléchambeau, who can shrink himself to meet the atomic people. Conversely, in "Une invasion de macrobes" (1909), André Couvreur portrays the opposite process, where the malevolent scientist Tornada causes a tremendous increase in microbe size. In 1912, Paul Arosa presented Les Mystérieuses Études du professeur Kruhl, which featured a German scientist who succeeded in sustaining the head of a guillotined man, similar to the magic performances of Georges Méliès and music-hall shows that exhibited living severed heads. The same year saw the publication of L'Homme à deux têtes by F.C. Rosensteel, which similarly explored this macabre theme. Henri-Georges Jeanne's L'Homme qui devint gorille in 1921, (Note: The novel originally appeared in 1911 under the title Le Roman d'un singe.) on the other hand, involved Professor Fringue transplanting an individual's brain into the skull of a gorilla. In Trois Ombres sur Paris (1929), (Note: The novel originally appeared in 1920 under the title Les Surhommes.) a researcher formulates a method to create superhumans for the purpose of equalizing all men. Les Petits Hommes de la pinède (1927) by Octave Béliard provides another instance of biological laws being manipulated, when a scientist creates a population of 30 cm-tall individuals with accelerated growth that eventually surpasses the scientist's control. Finally, Louis Forest's On Vole des Enfants à Paris (1906) and Guy de Téramond's L'Homme qui Peut Tout (1910) explore the possibility of transforming the minds of children and criminals to enhance their cognitive abilities, while Raoul Bigot depicts in Nounlegos (1919) a phrenologist scientist who developed a device for reading the human brain, without resorting to brain modification.

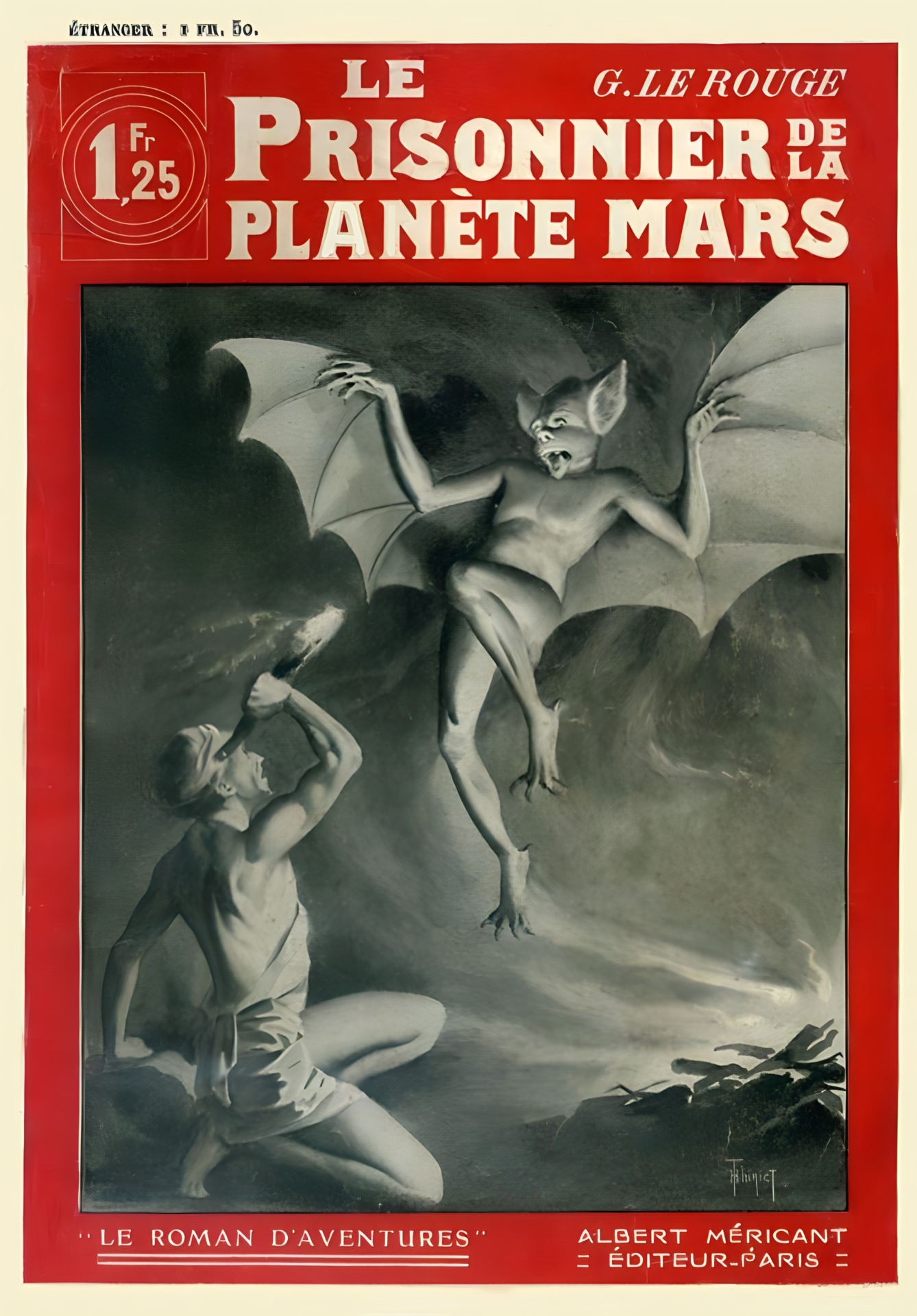
Propelled to his cost on the planet Mars, Robert Darvel encounters a Martian bat in Le Prisonnier de la planète Mars in 1908.

The popularization of pseudoscientific theories inspired fiction writers to explore the psychic realm. Gustave Le Rouge, in his two-part work Le Prisonnier de la planète Mars (1908) and La Guerre des vampires (1909), envisions an interstellar journey accomplished through the collective psychic energy of thousands of yogis who successfully propel protagonist engineer Robert Dravel to Mars. In L' me du docteur Kips (1912), Maurice Champagne portrays metempsychosis through a fakir who aids in the reincarnation of the hero in India. Joseph Jacquin and Aristide Fabre investigate the anabiosis abilities of fakirs in Le sommeil sous les blés (1927) while scientists artificially generate life by theft of psychic energy in Ville hantée (1911-1912) by Léon Groc and Le Voleur de cerveaux (1920) by Jean de Quirielle. Finally, authors in the scientific genre emphasize the risks of using telepathy and mind control, exemplified in André Couvreur and Michel Corday's Le Lynx (1911). The novel chronicles the adventures of a person who gains the ability to read minds by consuming a drug. Similarly, in Lucifer (novel), Jean de La Hire depicts Baron Glô van Warteck, a villainous mastermind who has created a tool that boosts his psychic abilities. He employs this device to enslave his adversaries and prey worldwide.

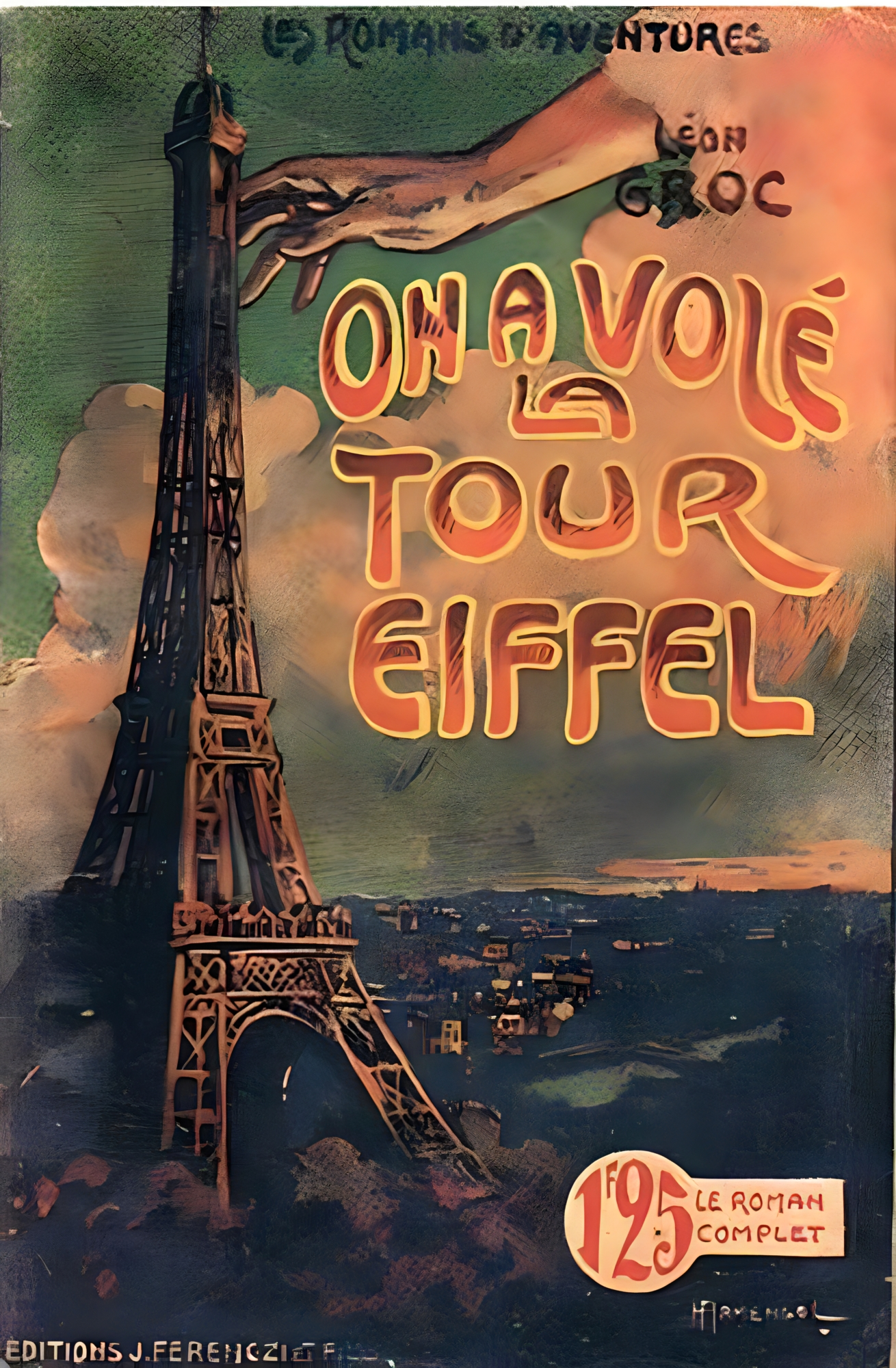
Cover of the novel On a volé la tour Eiffel (1923) by Léon Groc, illustrated by Henri Armengol.

Alteration and speculation of physical or chemical laws are common techniques used by authors in the science fiction genre. In On a volé la tour Eiffel (1921), Léon Groc explores alchemy through the character of Gourdon, who develops a method for converting iron into gold. Other writers utilize substances like radium to generate scientific fantasies in their plots. In Les idées de Monsieur Triggs (1936), (Note: The story was published in Harry Dickson's adventures, issue no. 152, entitled Les Sept petites chaises.)Jean Ray presents a stone with properties akin to radium to Harry Dickson, his valiant private detective. The stone cures skin diseases and causes explosions, thus serving as a unique and powerful tool. Similarly, Albert Bailly features a transparent spaceship made of ether in L'Éther Alpha (1929), (Note: The novel first appeared in serial form in the pages of Le Figaro in 1928, under the title Le Baiser de l'infini.) a novel that received the Prix Jules-Verne award in the same year, showcasing his imaginative writing skills. Additionally, authors in the scientific fiction genre speculate about the discovery of rays possessing multiple properties. For instance, in Aigle et colombe, novelist René d'Anjou portrays the alchemist Fédor Romalewski developing various inventions based on scientific discoveries, including super-radium, X-rays, and Z-rays. The vanishing of certain materials is a recurring motif in conjectural literature, exemplified by the loss of metal in Gaston de Pawlowski's Les Ferropucerons (1912) (Note: This short story was initially published under the title Au temps des barbares (contes futurs in 1909, before being included under the title "Les Ferropucerons" in Voyage au pays de la quatrième dimension in 1912.) and Serge-Simon Held's La Mort du fer (1931). Additionally, scientific innovations played a significant role in this imaginative literature. With his series of novels, Le Nyctalope, Jean de La Hire portrays advanced technology in vivid detail, featuring aircraft that can hover, electric submarines, rockets propelled by Hertzian waves, and highly advanced weaponry.

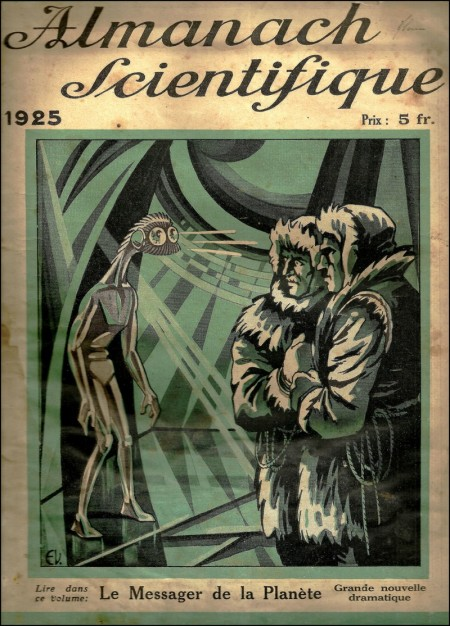
In 1924, José Moselli recounts the encounter between two polar explorers and a stranded Mercury inhabitant in Antarctica, in Le Messager de la planète.

Intimately connected to adventure novels due to their association with the extraordinary, conjectural novels give significant emphasis to travel, whether it be on unexplored territories of Earth, other planets, or even through time with the exploration of unknown life forms. - J.H. Rosny aîné extensively examined these topics in Les Navigateurs de l'infini (1925) and its sequel Les Astronautes (1960), along with the terrestrial realms uncovered in Les Profondeurs de Kyamo (1891) and Nymphée (1893, co-written with his brother J.-H. Rosny jeune). These works follow the protagonist, an explorer journeying through uncharted territories, as he discovers alternate civilizations. The solar system is a popular subject for novelists to describe the possibility of inhabited planets. Some famous examples include Mercury in Jean de La Hire's La Roue fulgurante (1908) and José Moselli's Le Messager de la planète (1924), Venusians in Maurice Leblanc's Les Trois Yeux (1920), and Martians in various novels about the Red Planet, such as Arnould Galopin's Docteur Oméga and Henri Gayar's Aventures merveilleuses de Serge Myrandhal (1908). Some famous examples include Mercury in Jean de La Hire's La La Roue fulgurante (1908) and José Moselli's Le Messager de la planète (1924), Venusians in Maurice Leblanc's Les Trois Yeux (1920), and Martians in various novels about the Red Planet, such as Arnould Galopin's Docteur Oméga and Henri Gayar's Les Robinsons de la planète Mars (1908). In addition to life forms discovered on lost or neighboring planets, this literature exposes the existence of races that surround us without our awareness. One example of such a race is the Sarvants, an intelligent arachnoid species that evolves in the stratosphere. Maurice Renard details this discovery in The Blue Peril (1911). Similarly, in Rosny aîné's short story Un autre monde (nouvelle) (1895), the narrator Gueldrois employs his augmented vision to detect invisible geometric life forms prevalent in our surroundings. Finally, the concept of time travel, with or without the aid of a machine, is widely explored by scientific fiction writers. In his novel L'Horloge des siècles (1902), Albert Robida describes a scenario where after an unknown cataclysm, the Earth reverses its rotation, causing time to flow backwards. In the satirical novel "La Belle Valence" (1923), André Blandin and Théo Varlet describe the exploits of Poilus who, having come across The Time Machine described by H. G. Wells, accidentally transport their entire infantry troop to 14th-century Valencia, in the midst of a medieval war between the Spanish and Arab armies.

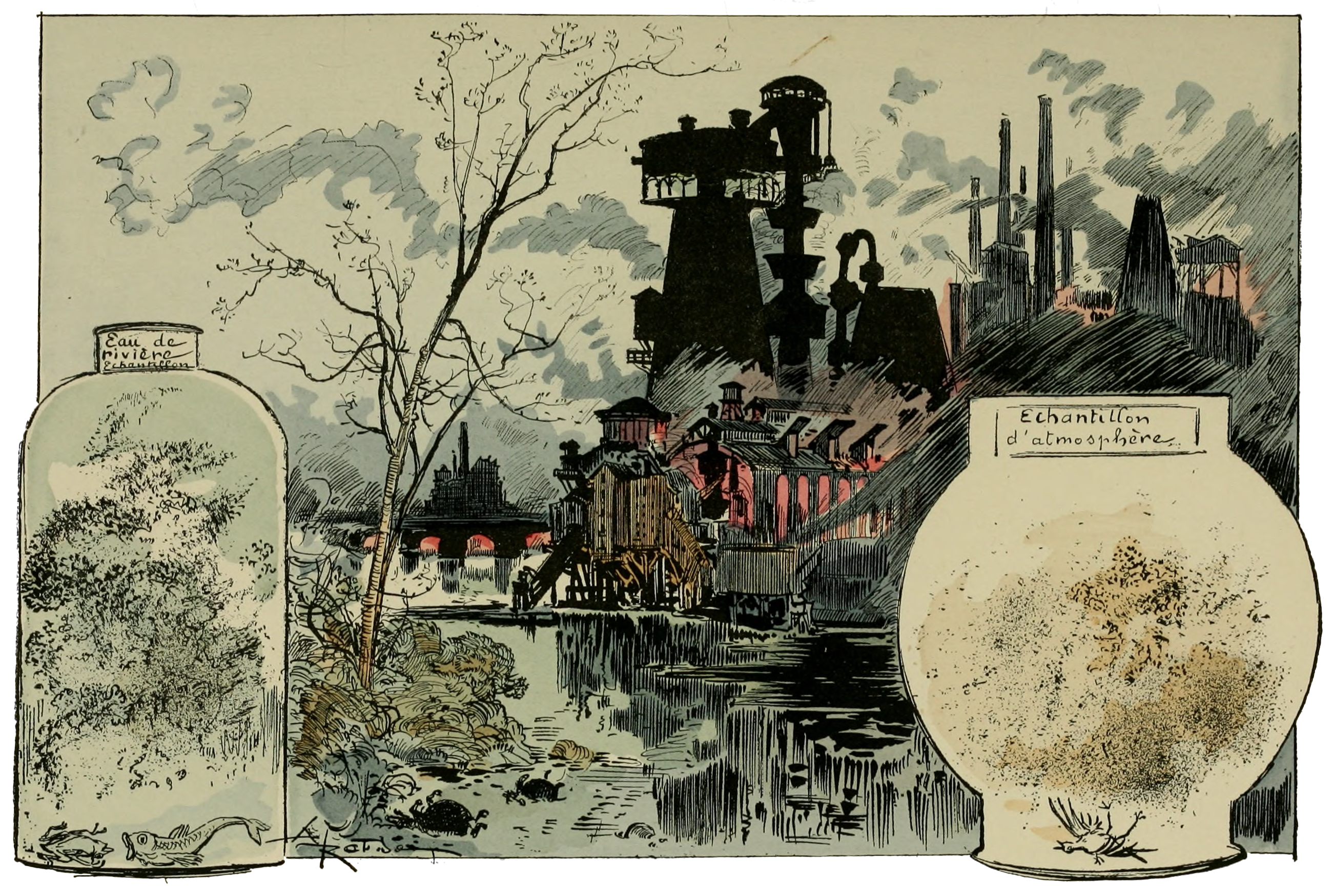
In La vie électrique, published in 1890, Albert Robida depicts with his usual satirical eye the progress of an epidemic, the accidental result of "humanitarian and political" research.

Finally, another favorite theme of this literary genre is anticipation. Anticipation novels enable us to envision the effects of technological advancements on daily life, both in the near and distant future, or to envision a future world, whether utopian or dystopian. For instance, in 1910-1911, illustrator Henri Lanos and Jules Perrin co-authored Un monde sur le monde, a speculative fiction in an ambiguous future where a billionaire faces an uprising triggered by the erection of a towering city of 1,900 meters. Léon de Tinseau's Le Duc Rollon (1912-1913) portrays a post-apocalyptic world in the year 2000, plunged into savagery after a global warfare. Ben Jackson's (Note: The real author of this novel is Jean-Marie Gerbault, who pretends to be the translator, attributing it to Ben Jackson, an imaginary American author.) novel, L' ge Alpha ou la marche du temps (1942), takes place in a city of the 21st century characterized by high levels of inequality and widespread use of atomic energy.

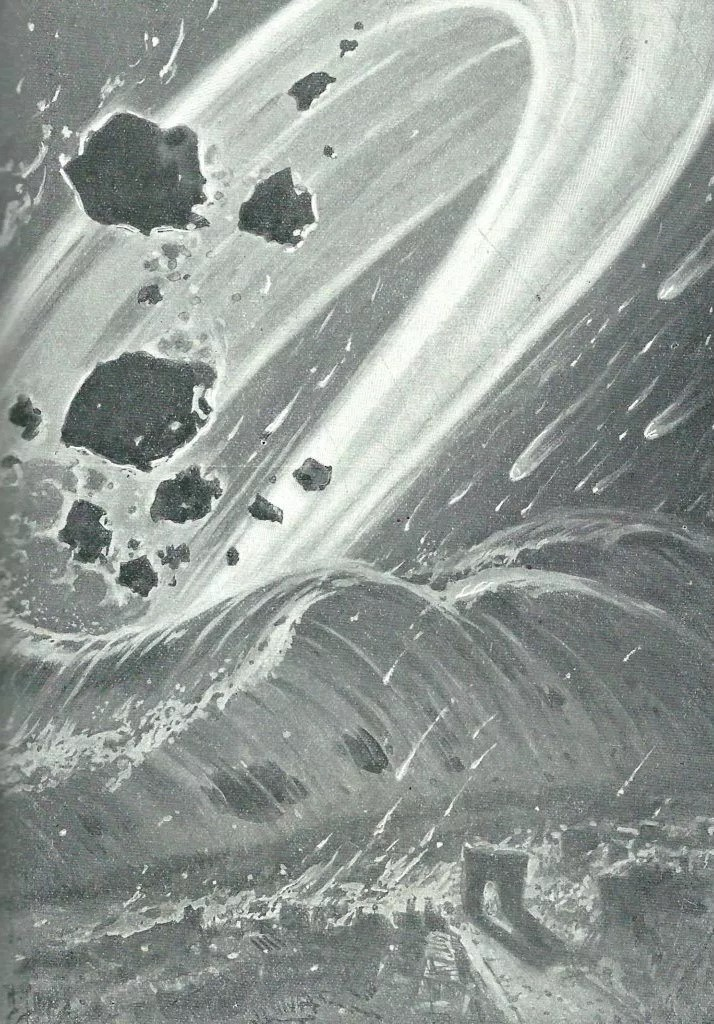
"Destruction of the Earth by the impact of a comet", illustration by Henri Lanos for Camille Flammarion's Omega: The Last Days of the World

The theme of anticipated future conflict recurs throughout Albert Robida's works, beginning with War in the 20th Century (1887), and continuing in his columns for La Caricature and his compositions for La Guerre infernale (1908), a novel by Pierre Giffard written during a time of heightened war tension. Robida's illustrations vividly portray the deadly and innovative nature of the impending war, featuring armored cars, asphyxiating gas and gas masks, gigantic shells, and lookout posts against aerial bombardment. These depictions do not exhibit any nationalistic sentiment. Examples include Captain Danrit's tetralogy La Guerre de demain (1888-1896) and Albert Bonneau's series Les Samouraïs du Soleil pourpre (1928-1931). Finally, anticipation can be portrayed as an apocalyptic narrative, like the cataclysm in La Force mystérieuse (1913) by J.-H. Rosny aîné. Following an unknown cosmic disturbance, the luminous spectrum induces a temporary crisis of madness in all living beings, resulting in the decimation of a significant portion of humanity. This topic is also examined by astronomer Camille Flammarion in the 1893 work Omega: The Last Days of the World. This text is both an anticipatory novel and a scientific essay discussing potential ways for the planet Earth to come to an end.

=== Publication media that encourage a popular audience ===
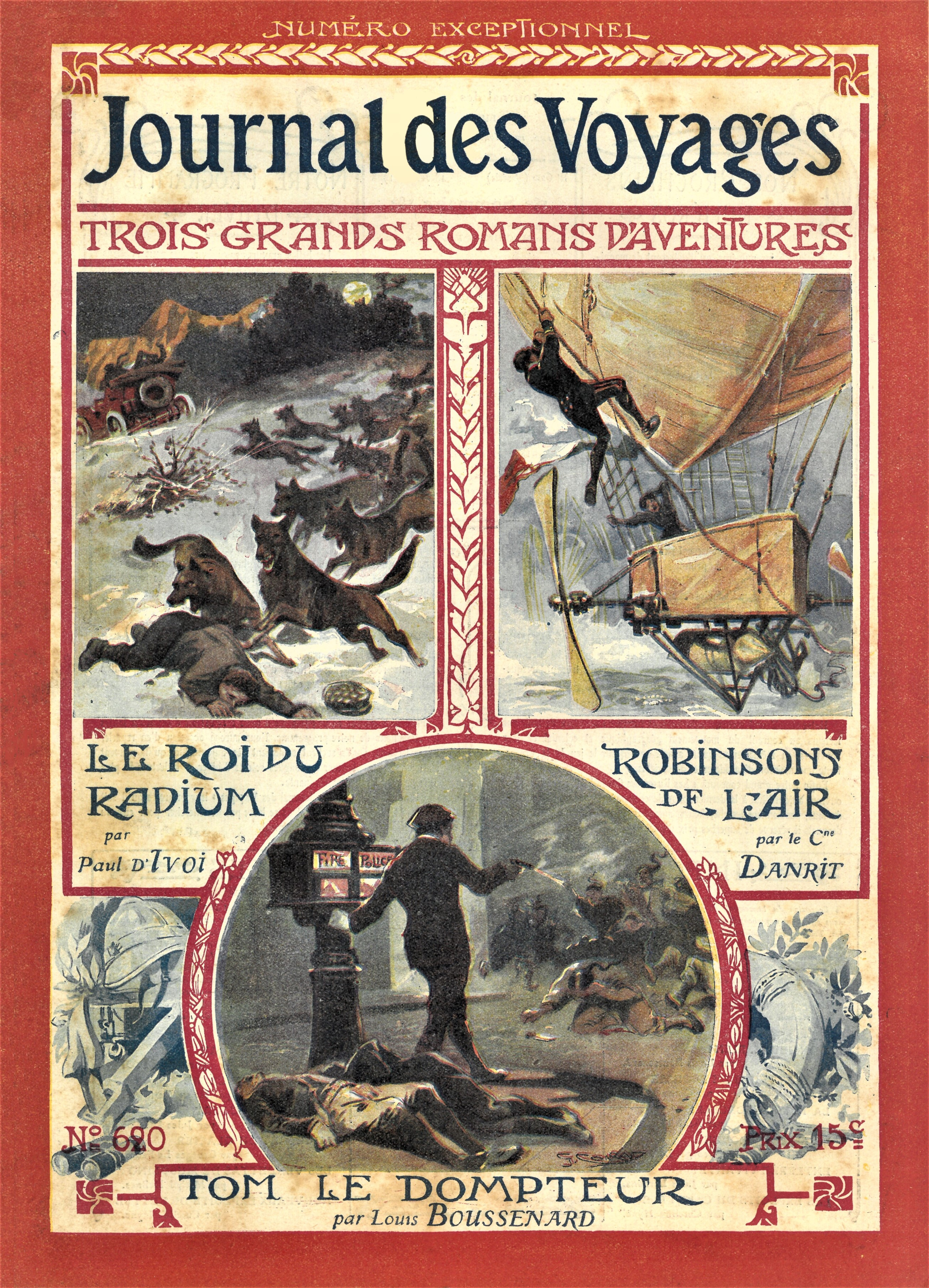
Journal des voyages magazine offers a mix of exploration stories and scientific adventure serials.

Maurice Renard encouraged his colleagues to embrace and promote the use of science fiction. Although the genre's theories were initially read by the Parisian literary elite of the early 20th century, proponents of the genre were primarily popular novelists who published their works in large-circulation periodicals and publishing houses geared towards workers. To captivate their readers, writers crafted exciting tales with archetypal heroes and applied these storylines to merveilleux scientifique, as well as popular genres like sentimental literature, historical adventure stories, and detective tales. However, detractors soon labeled the works promoted by Renard as a sub-genre due to their formulaic nature.

By the close of the 19th century, various scientific journals published scientific adventure tales alongside popularization articles. The Journal des voyages, established by Charles-Lucien Huard, and Sciences et Voyages magazine, founded by the Offenstadt brothers, published serialized works in the field of merveilleux scientifique in addition to travel accounts. Meanwhile, La Science illustrée by Louis Figuier featured popular science articles alongside novels by authors Louis Boussenard and Count Didier de Chousy. General interest magazines also published a variety of serialized novels, including Lectures pour tous, which contained short stories from various authors such as Octave Béliard, Maurice Renard, Raoul Bigot, Noëlle Roger, and J.-H. Rosny aîné. Rosny aîné. Additionally, the magazines operated by Pierre Lafitte - the daily Excelsior journal and monthly Je sais tout - featured works by Guy de Téramond, Léon Groc, André Couvreur, Michel Corday, and additional short stories by Maurice Renard and J.-H. Rosny aîné, Maurice Leblanc, Michel Corday, Paul Arosa, and Jules Perrin were notable authors of speculative fiction in early 20th-century France. Additionally, certain daily newspapers, including L'Intransigeant, which featured multiple novels by Maurice Renard and Léon Groc, and Le Matin, which published works by Maurice Renard, Jean de La Hire, and Gaston Leroux, provided their readers with sci-fi and fantasy novels. Some other publications, such as L'Assiette au beurre and Le Miroir du Monde, utilized special issues to publish occasional merveilleux-scientifique stories.

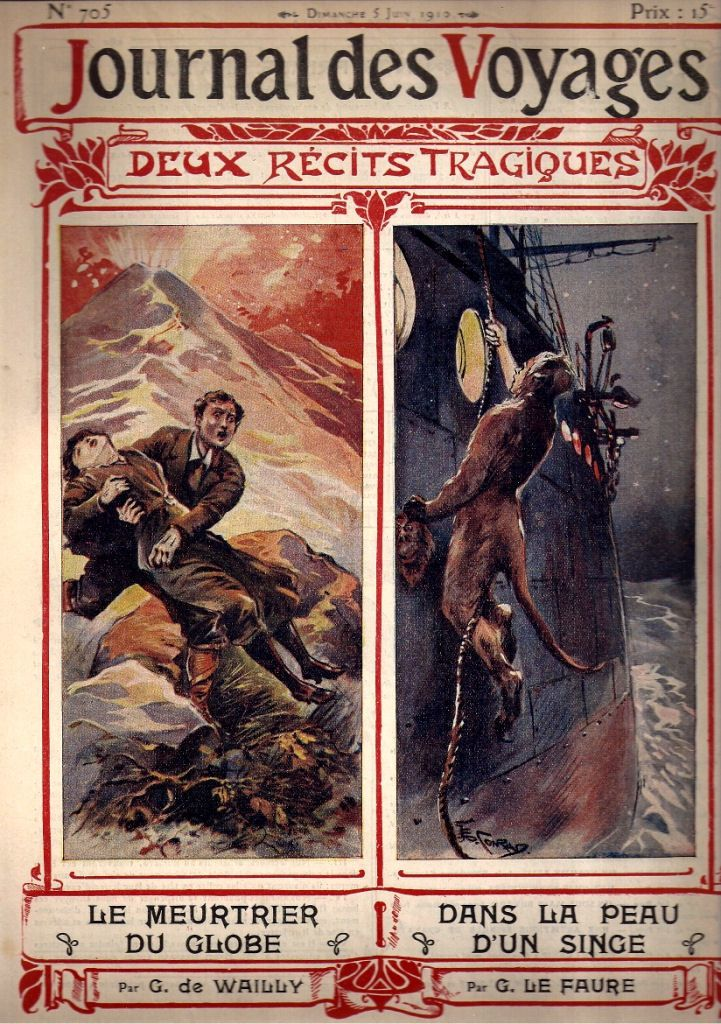
Journal des voyages No. 705, june 1910.

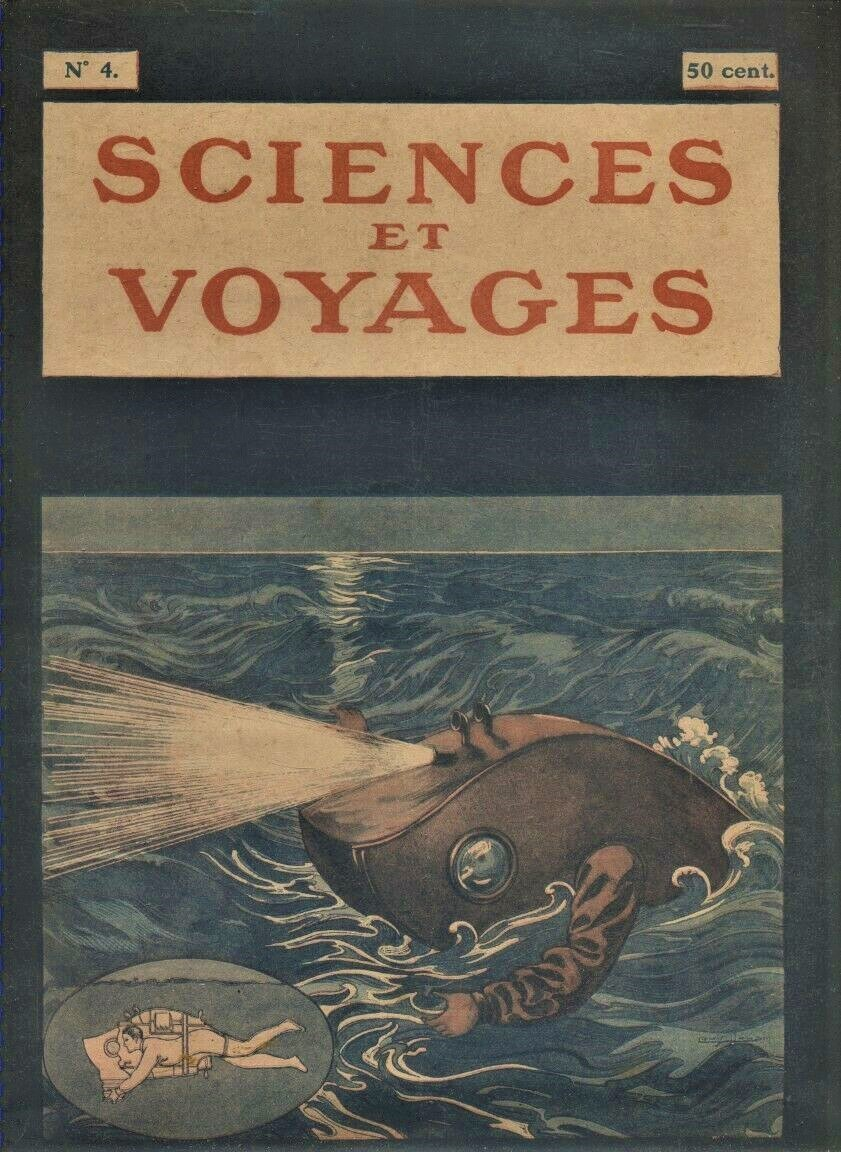
Sciences et Voyages No. 4, november 1919.

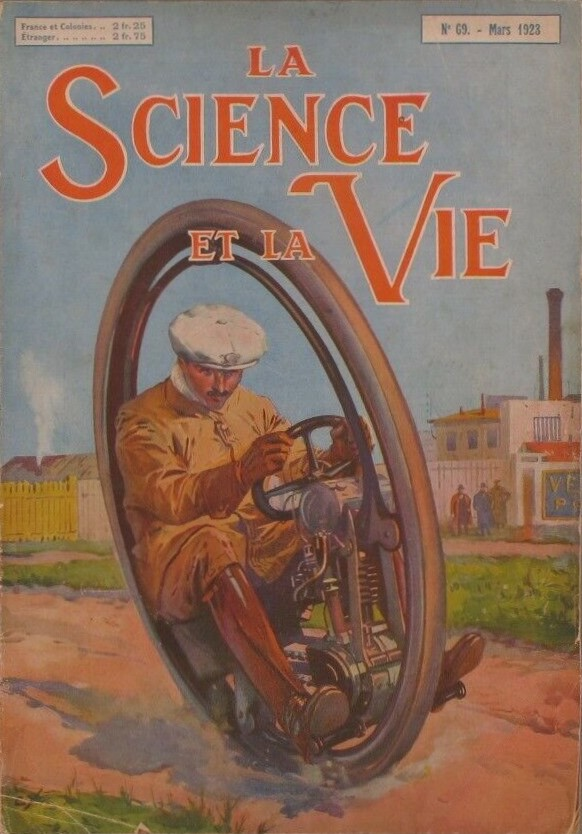
Science & Vie No. 69, march 1923.

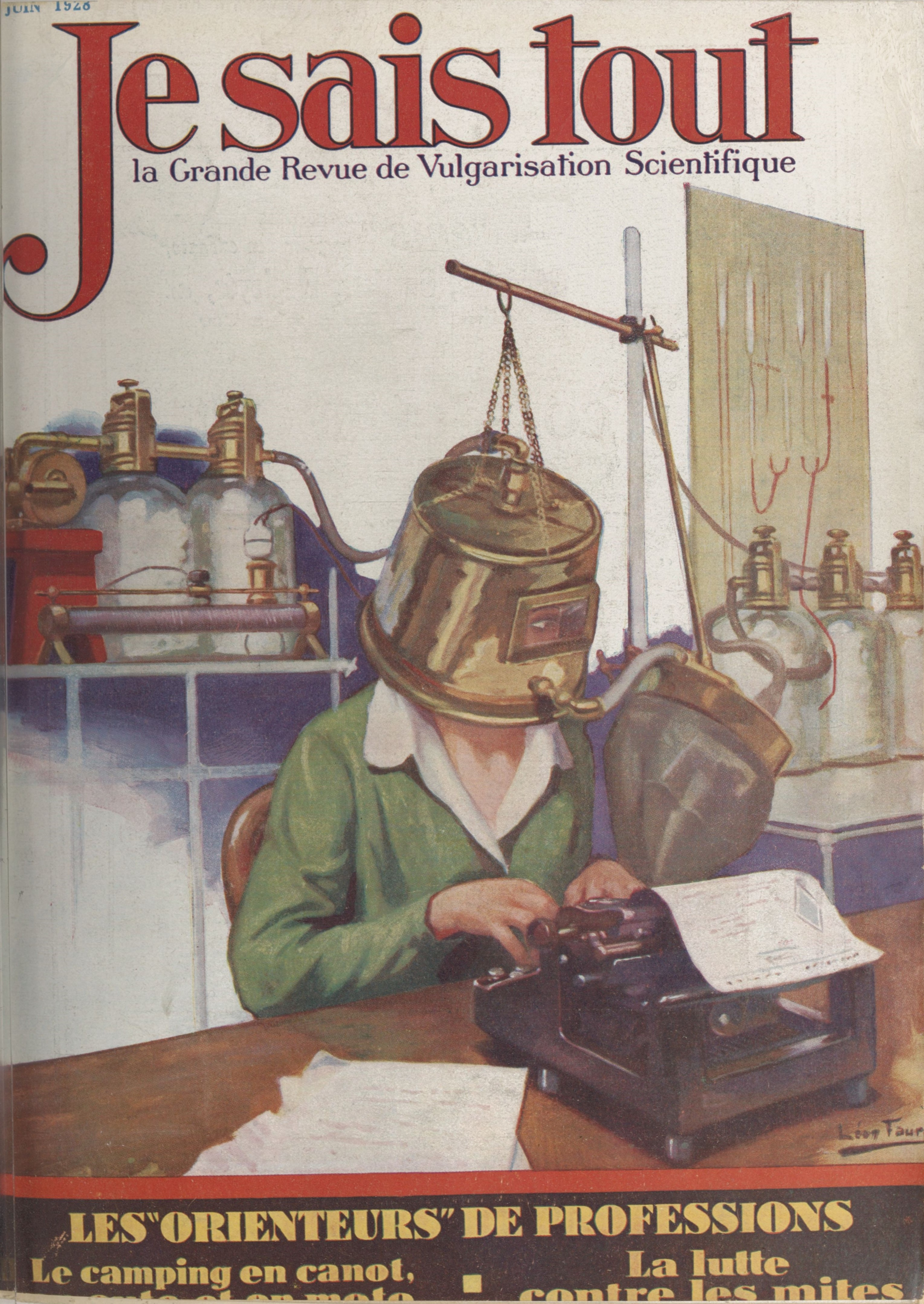
Je sais tout, june 1928.

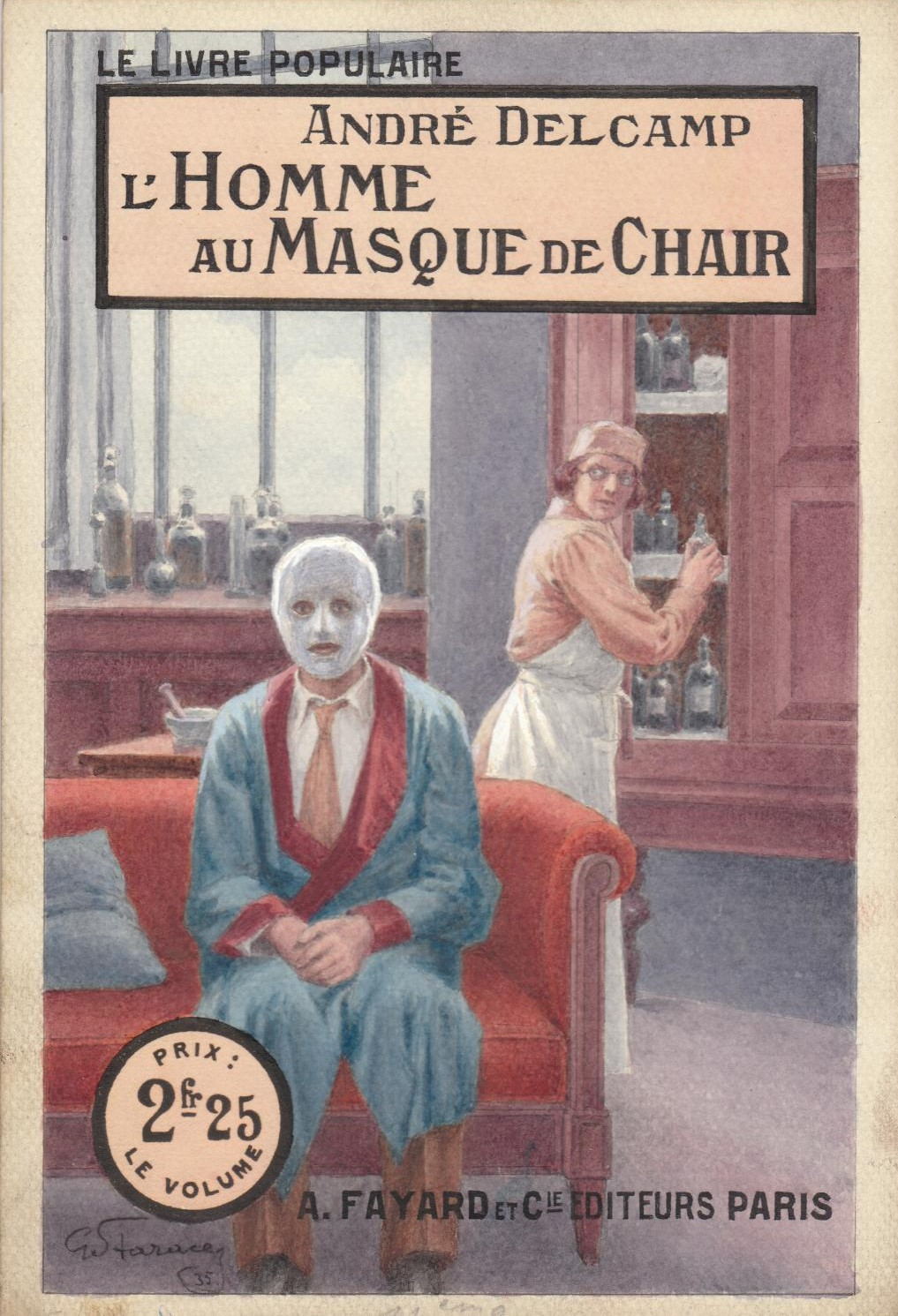
An Italian painter, Gino Starace worked with a number of publishing houses to illustrate popular literature, including some merveilleux-scientifique novels such as André Delcamp's L'Homme au masque de chair, published in 1935 in the "Le Livre populaire" collection by Fayard.

Several successful publishing houses, frequently producing large print runs, are also engaged in distributing novels related to merveilleux scientifique. However, no particular compilation explicitly categorizes itself as a representative of this genre. Four publishers, namely Albert Méricant, Jules Tallandier, Joseph Ferenczi, and Pierre Lafitte, are notable for their consistent catalogs. Editions Albert Mericant published multiple works by Gustave Le Rouge and Paul d'Ivoi in the "Le Roman d'Aventures" series (1908-1909). Additionally, works by Leon Groc, Jules Hoche, and Jean de Quirielle were published in the "Les Recits Mysterieux" collection (1912-1914). Editions Tallandier regularly had covers illustrated by Maurice Toussaint. They offered two collections, the "Bibliothèque des Grandes Aventures" (1927-1930), featuring authors such as Henri Gayar, Norbert Sevestre, Paul d'Ivoi, Louis Boussenard, and René Thévenin. This was followed by Le Lynx (literary collection) (1939-1941), with reprints by H. J. Magog, André Couvreur, and Léon Groc. In addition to his periodicals, Pierre Lafitte published science fiction novels through his publishing house (Editions Pierre Lafitte). These novels were notably featured in the "Idéal-Bibliothèque" collection, which included works by Clément Vautel and Maurice Renard, as well as in the "Point d'interrogation" detective collection, which featured some speculative works by Maurice Leblanc. Ferenczi & Sons contributed to the distribution of merveilleux-scientifique novels through several collections. Many of the covers were illustrated by Henri Armengol. Some of the collections include "The Great Novels", "Trips and Adventures", "The Adventure Book", "The Small Adventure Novel", "The Secret Police Files," and "The Novels of Guy de Téramond," a collection dedicated to this particular author. Smaller publishers participated in this movement as well, including Editions La Fenêtre ouverte, where writer and translator Régis Messac debuted the "Les Hypermondes" collection in 1935. This series focused on scientific tales (Note: While the term "science fiction" was definitively established in the United States in the 1930s, the term "scientific novel" was favored in France at the same time, following the example of "scientific romance" in use in the United Kingdom since the end of the 19th century.) but was terminated prematurely by World War II.

Concurrently, science fiction literature was expanding abroad. Several novels in the scientific imagination genre were translated and published in Italy, Great Britain, the Czech Republic, Russia, and Spain a few months after their release in France. Notably, Il Romanzo Mensile, an Italian magazine, published 26 tales of scientific imagination between 1908 and 1933. Some of the most famous stories by authors such as Maurice Renard (L'Homme truqué), Guy de Téramond (L'Homme qui voit à travers les murailles), and Gaston Leroux (Le Fauteuil hanté) were included. The Transalpine Monthly, published by the daily Corriere della Sera, showcases a diverse collection of intriguing and imaginative tales from renowned fiction writers across various nations. French novelists of merveilleux scientifique coexist alongside acclaimed authors including Scotland's Conan Doyle, England's Henry Rider Haggard, Ireland's Sheridan Le Fanu, and Australia's Carlton Dawe.

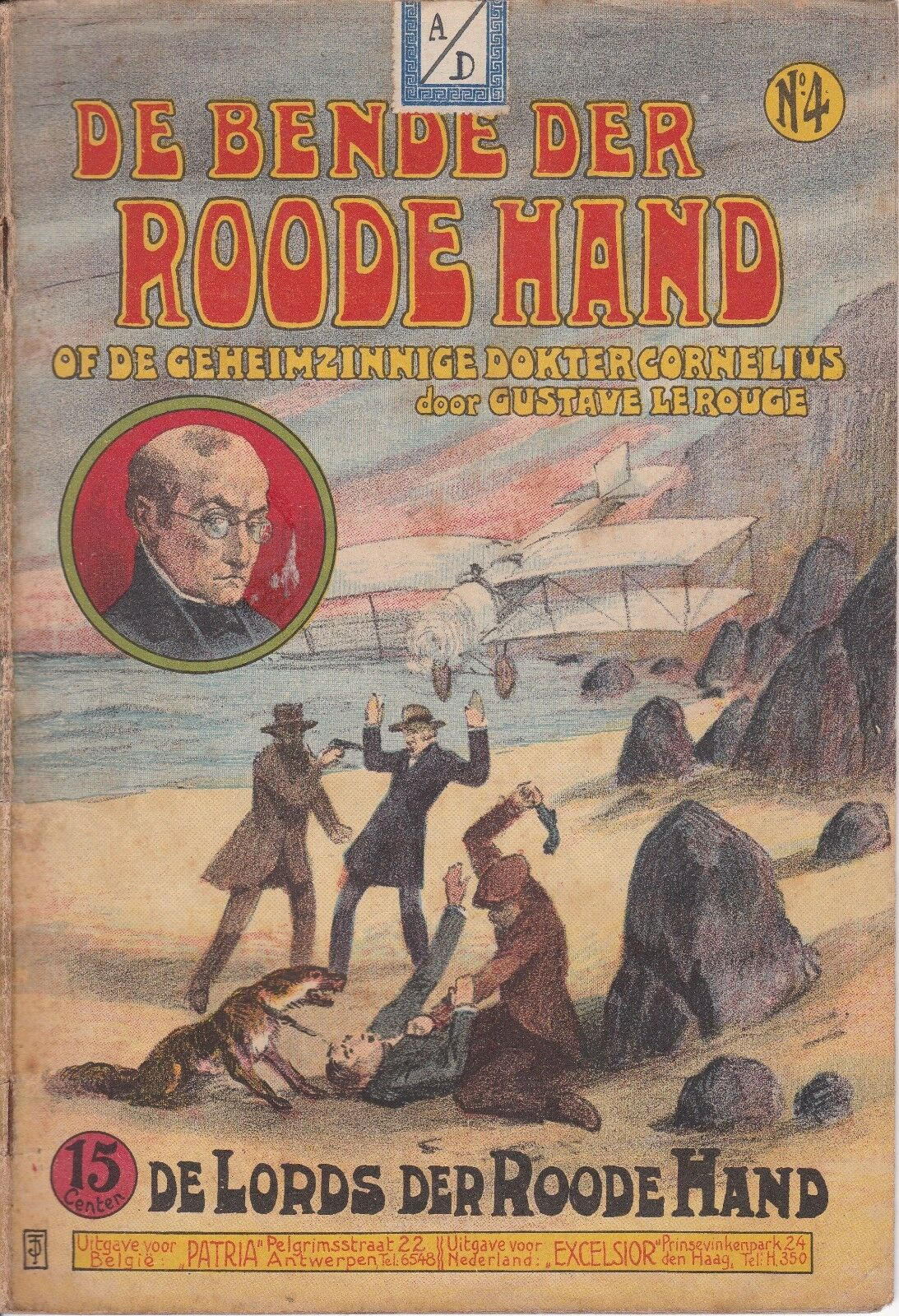
The adventures of Dr. Cornelius are translated and published abroad. Cover by Julien t' Felt for the Dutch version published in 1927.

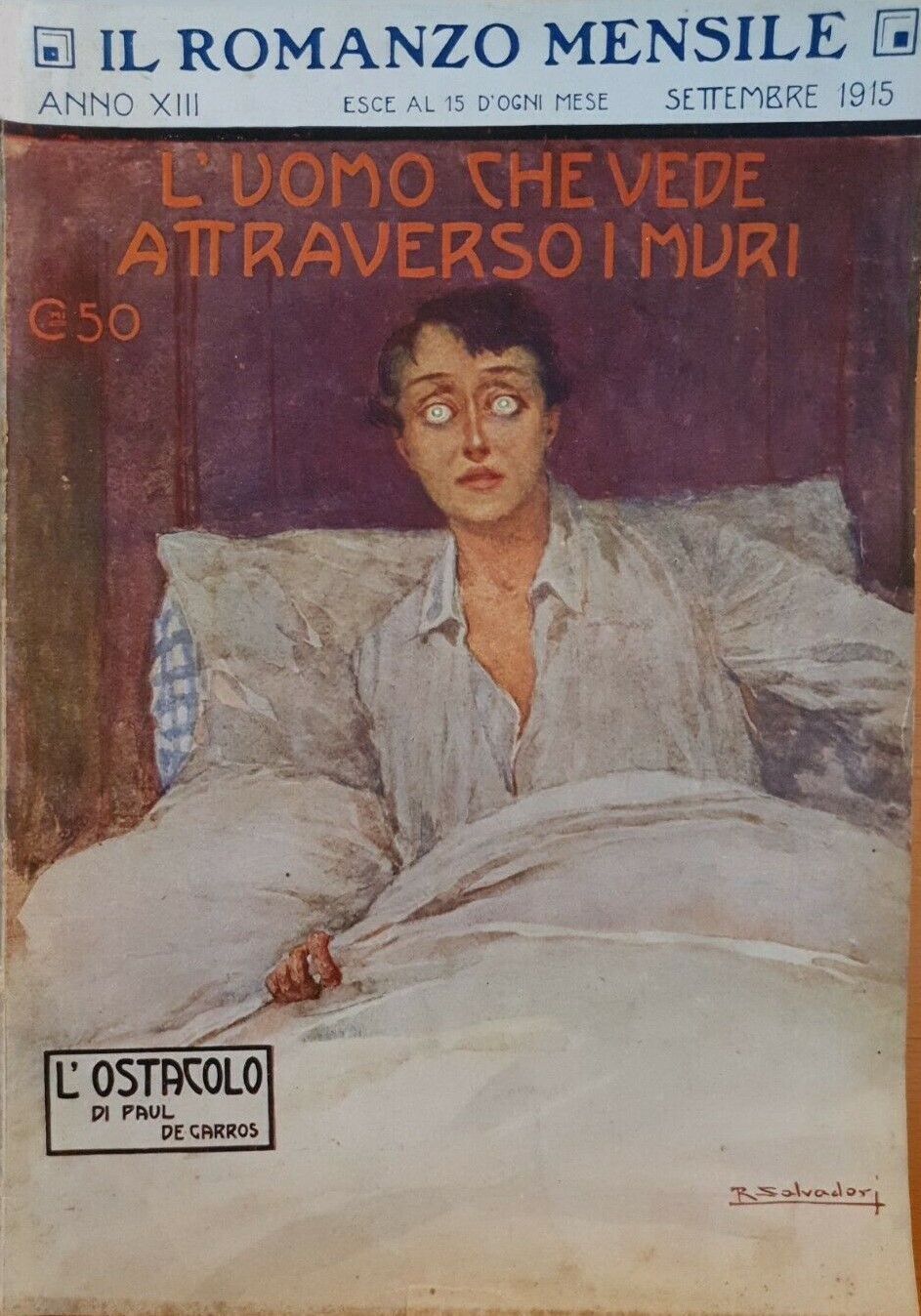
Riccardo Salvadori, regular illustrator for Il Romanzo Mensile magazine, illustrates the Italian version of Guy de Téramond's L'Homme qui voit à travers les murailles.

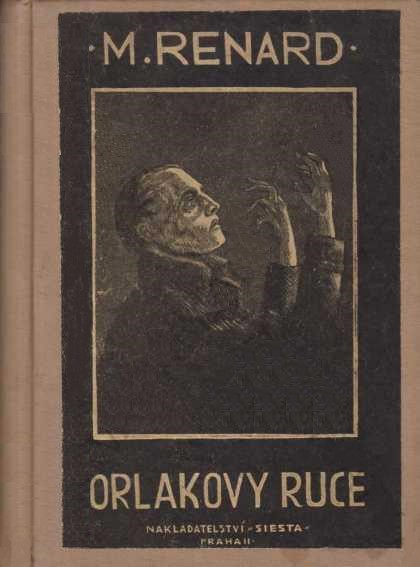
Maurice Renard's novel Les Mains d'Orlac was translated into Czech in 1926, six years after its French publication.

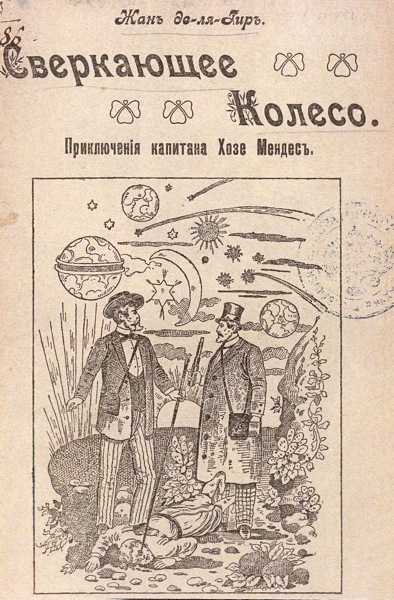
An interstellar tale, Jean de La Hire's La Roue fulgurante was translated into Russian in 1908.

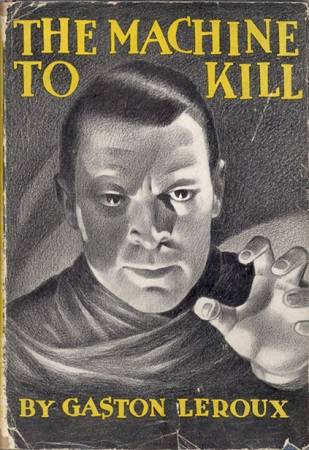
The English version of Gaston Leroux's La Machine à assassiner was published by The Macaulay Company in 1935.

== Other media for merveilleux scientifique ==
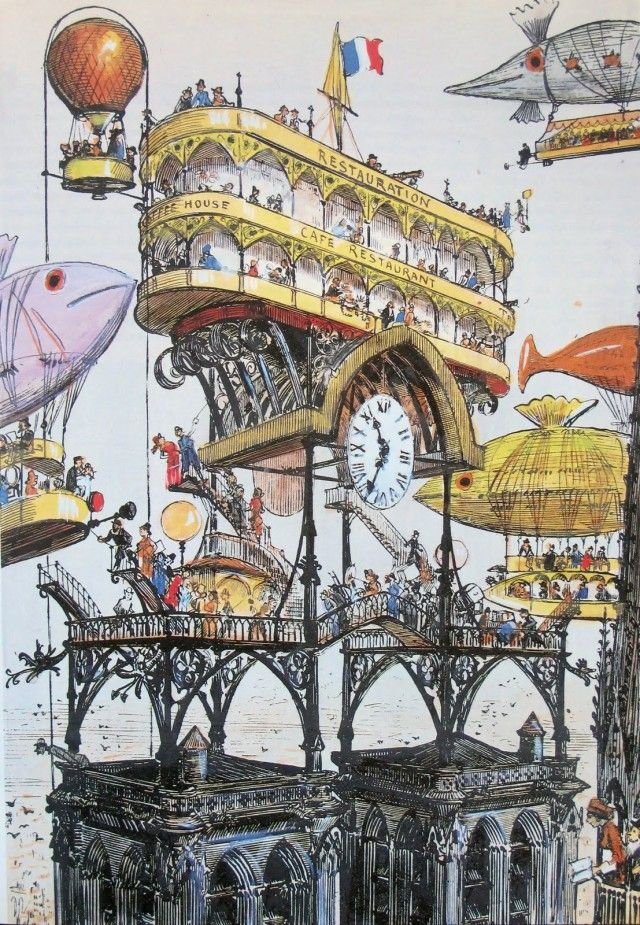
The towers of Notre-Dame de Paris cathedral house the central aircraft station in Albert Robida's Le Vingtième Siècle (1883).

=== Enchanting science through illustrations ===
Illustrators played a significant role in the development of merveilleux scientifique due to their graphic imagination. The first generation of illustrators ventured to utilize innovative imagery, satire, and caricature in the French press. Albert Robida typifies this group of cartoonists with his comical exploits, like Saturnin Farandoul's Voyages très extraordinaires (1879), which parodies Jules Verne's Voyages extraordinaires. Gradually, the illustrations became less exaggerated as artists developed their own unique style. Experimentation occurred on the covers of both magazines and novels, as well as within the pages of speculative fictional accounts. However, publishers maintained closer control over novel cover designs, limiting artistic freedom. In fact, illustrators prioritized technological fantasy over scientific accuracy, resulting in a visual rather than scientific approach. Consequently, scenes frequently portray individuals attired in three-piece suits and top hats, mingling with futuristic apparatuses like "telephonoscopes" and aerial railroads.

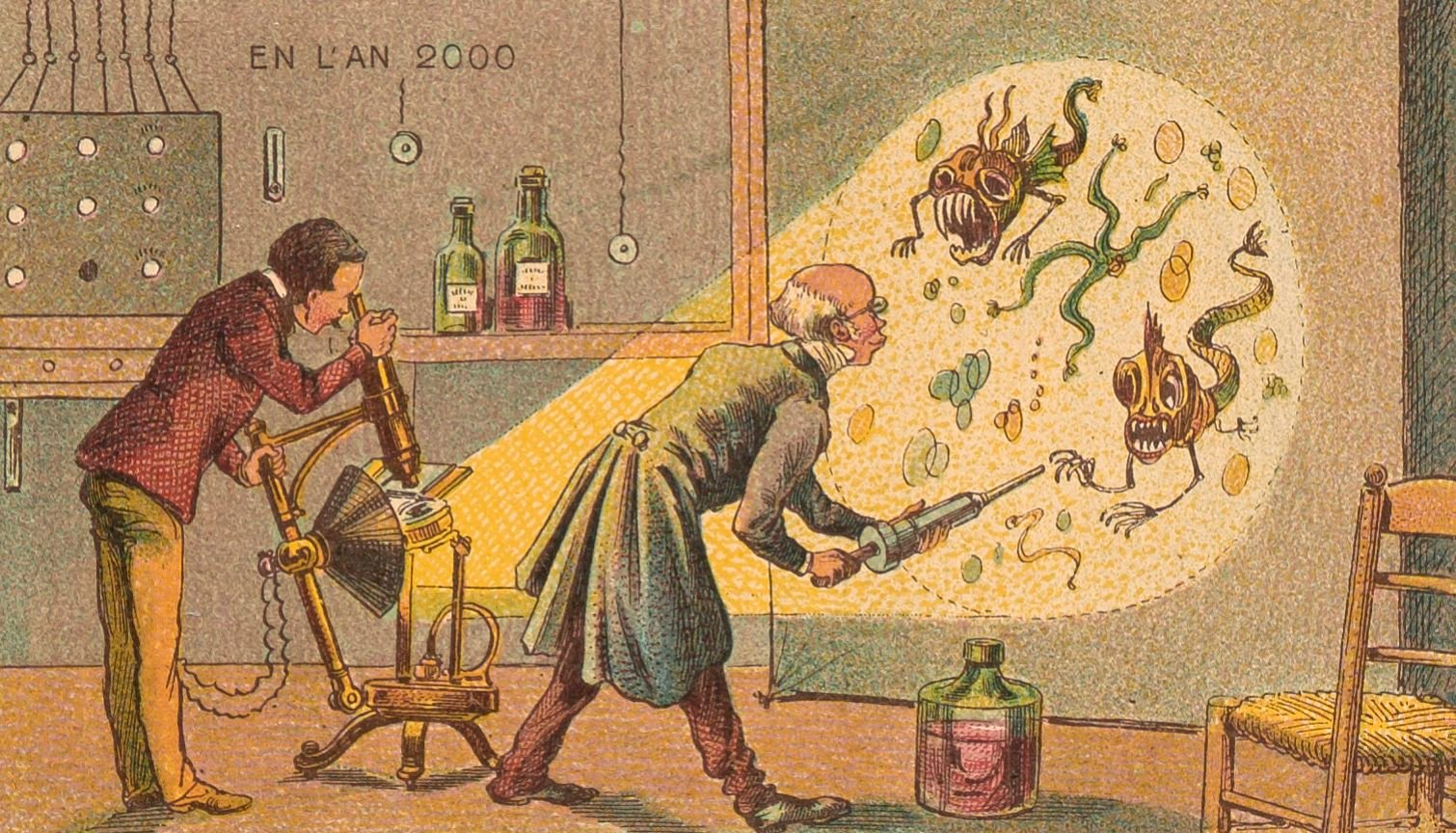
La chasse aux microbes, color lithograph by Jean-Marc Côté for the En l'an 2000 (1910) series of futuristic postcards.

Moreover, illustrators are tasked with illustrating the writings of novelists who extrapolate scientific inventions and those of scientists who aim to popularize scientific knowledge, resulting in a combination of genres and a reciprocal exchange between the fantastical and the scientific. To convey scientific imagery, often consisting of unrealistic visuals, illustrators must employ their imagination to make it understandable to the reader. For instance, when viewed under a microscope, microbes may resemble snakes or amphibians. Illustration is crucial in developing a merveilleux-scientifique imaginary by continuously blending visual elements between the two components. This is achieved through various means, including the evoked theme, the alternating of incredible stories and scientific articles, or the use of photomontage. The use of the technique that combines photographs and painted inserts, which was frequently utilized in Je sais tout magazine, serves to accentuate the connection between wonder and science.

Alongside magazine interior illustrations and novel covers, numerous other media aided in the proliferation of this merveilleux-scientifique imagery. For instance, in the 1950s, the chocolatier Cantaloup-Catala published a collection of postcards and collectible images titled "Anticipation... life in the year 2000" to idealize the future means of transportation.

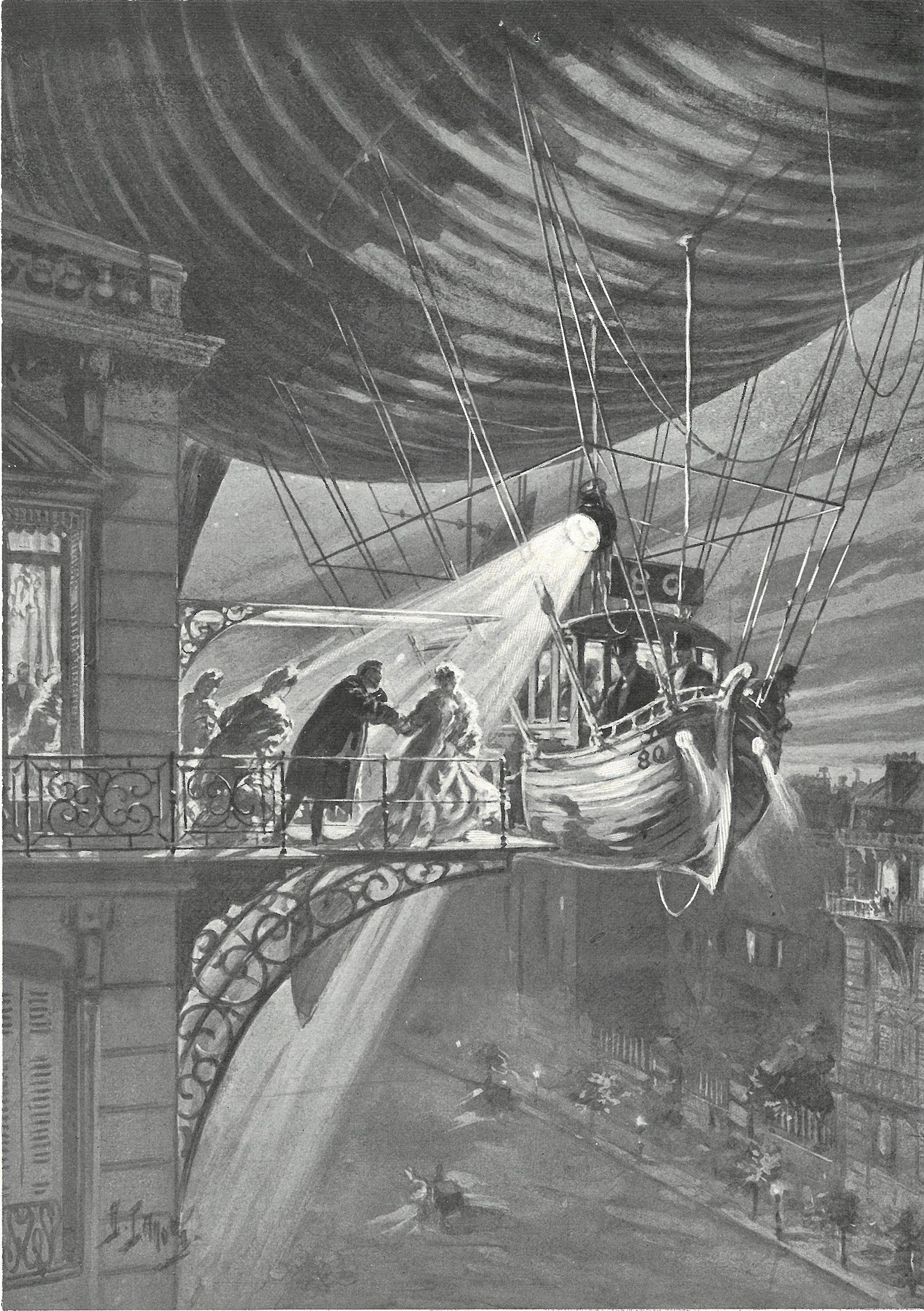
"Une sortie de bal", illustration by Henri Lanos in Je sais tout, February 1905.

The depiction of the futuristic city is a recurring theme in the graphic art of merveilleux scientifique. Its significance goes beyond just being a mere setting; it symbolizes the society of the future and provides a pretext for showcasing a favorite illustration theme - the juxtaposition of man and his monumental surroundings. Airborne vehicles dancing against a backdrop of disproportionate architecture is a common feature of this imagery. The planes disembark a constant flow of travelers on the rooftops functioning as flight decks. The merveilleux-scientifique vision is pervaded by exoticism, which is especially emphasized on the book covers. Regardless of the storyline, the illustrators always include a visual element that announces the adventure in a distant and lesser-known nation. The desire to disorient readers is paired with an effort to stimulate their imagination, exemplified by Georges Conrad's illustrations gracing many covers of the Journal des voyages. Conrad draws inspiration from Parisian libraries. In contrast, space travel tales frequently appear in merveilleux-scientifique works, but corresponding illustrations are infrequent and noticeably less groundbreaking.

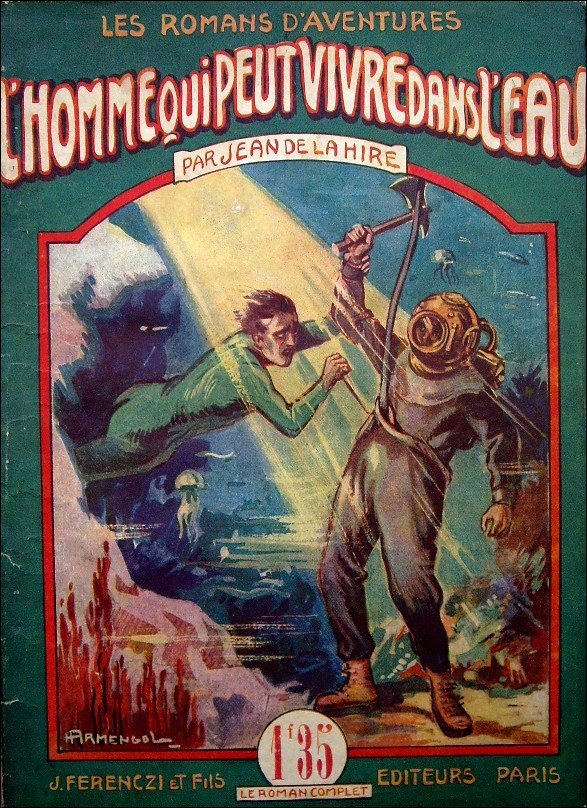
After Gino Starace's drawings accompanied L'Homme qui peut vivre dans l'eau published as a serial in Le Matin in 1909, Henri Armengol designed the cover for the novel published by Ferenczi in 1922.

With the rise of the merveilleux-scientifique genre, illustrators began to establish their own unique styles. Albert Robida, a prosperous cartoonist and novelist, is an emblematic example. He advocated for progress, but also harbored concerns about its potential excesses. Robida conveyed his imaginative concepts and visionary inventions through a diverse range of media, including posters, lithographs, caricatures, and novels. Through all of these art forms, he primarily sought to highlight humanity's flaws with humor. While Robida was a prolific illustrator of this graphic genre between the end of the 19th century and World War I, several emblematic artists of merveilleux-scientifique imagery emerged after the war. Among them is Henri Lanos, who began his career in conjectural graphics by illustrating H.G. Wells' novel "The Sleeper Awakes" (1899) and later contributed to many popular science articles. Increasingly popular, the artist developed a unique visual style characterized by frequent use of bird's-eye views depicting chaotic scenes or individuals juxtaposed with massive structures. Notably, Henri Armengol and Maurice Toussaint seamlessly integrated their graphic art with literary works, cementing their legacy as highly productive contributors to this genre. Armengol was the regular illustrator for the Ferenczi publishing house in the 1920s and 1930s, and contributed to the success of the "Les Romans d'aventures" collection with its distinctive green background. Toussaint also illustrated the covers of numerous collections for the Tallandier publishing house, including almost the entire "La Bibliothèque des grandes aventures" collection with its blue-backed covers.

Finally, in popular literature illustration, illustrators such as Gino Starace and Georges Vallée collaborated with numerous publishers, whereas the majority only occasionally entered the field of conjecture. For instance, Albert Guillaume illustrated a special issue of L'Assiette au beurre in 1901 dedicated to space, and Arnould Moreau illustrated Octave Béliard's short story La Journée d'un Parisien au xxie siècle in Lectures pour tous in 1910. From the 1920s onwards, Henri Lanos was succeeded by A. Noël as the illustrator of scientific articles in Je sais tout magazine. Noël's drawings are closer to industrial art and primarily focus on technical aspects, which distinguishes them from the poetic style of his predecessor. This shift in generations exemplifies the overall progression of magazines, which increasingly prioritize technical advancements over the thought experiments promoted by the Renardian merveilleux-scientifique model.

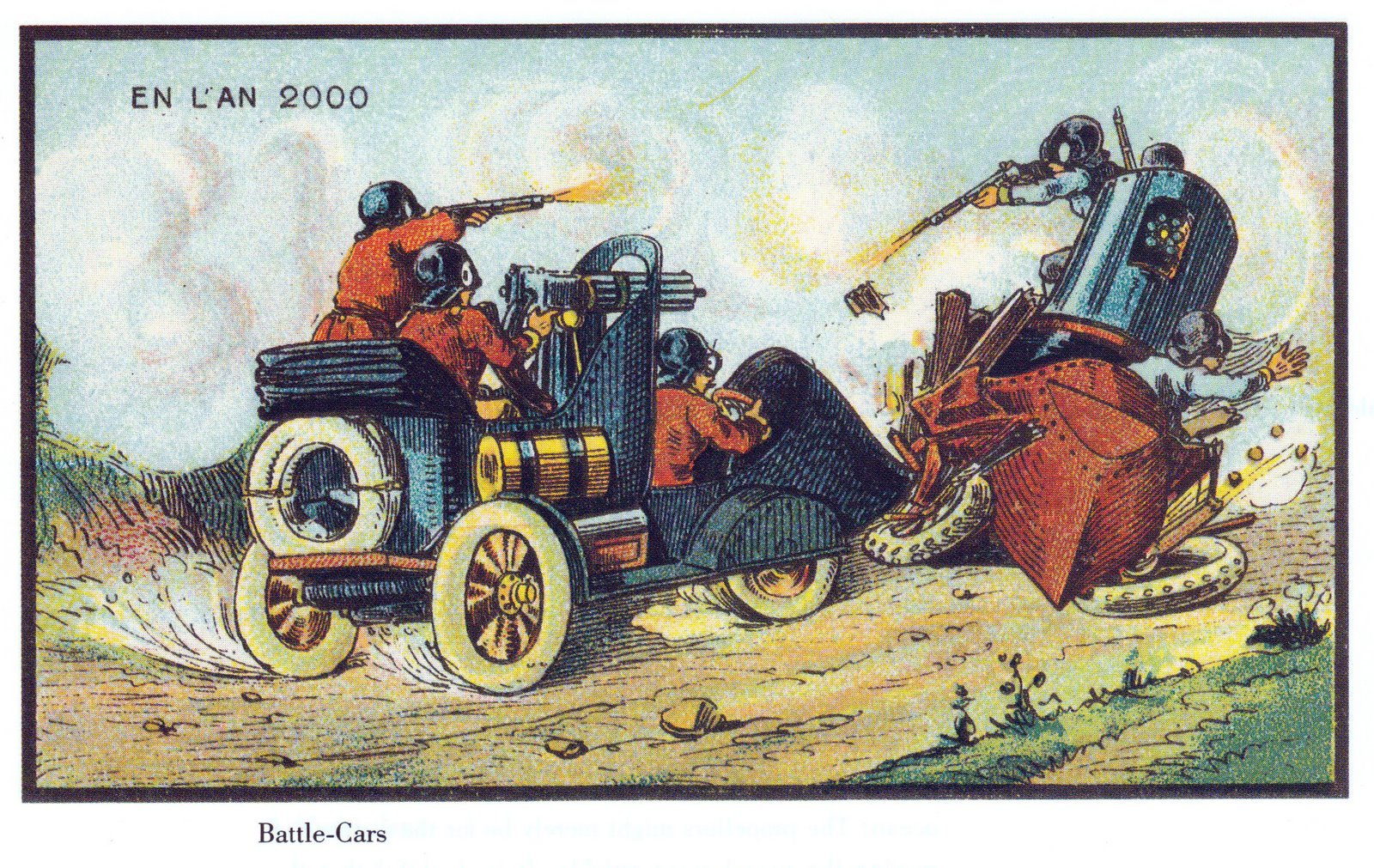
Automobiles de guerre, color lithograph from the En l'an 2000 series (1910).

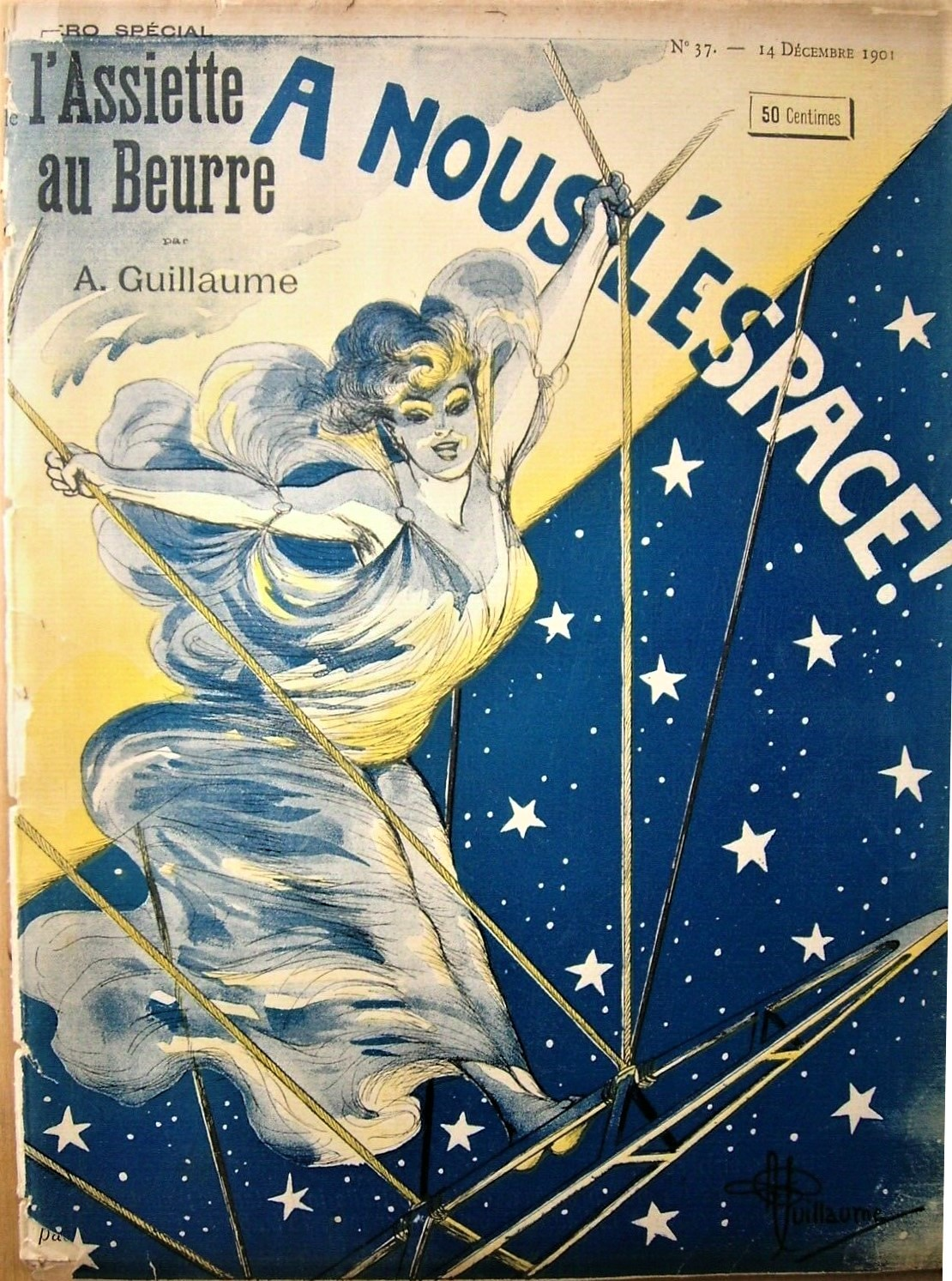
L'Assiette au beurre devoted an issue to the conquest of the air. This satirical exercise in anticipation is entirely illustrated by Albert Guillaume (December 1901).

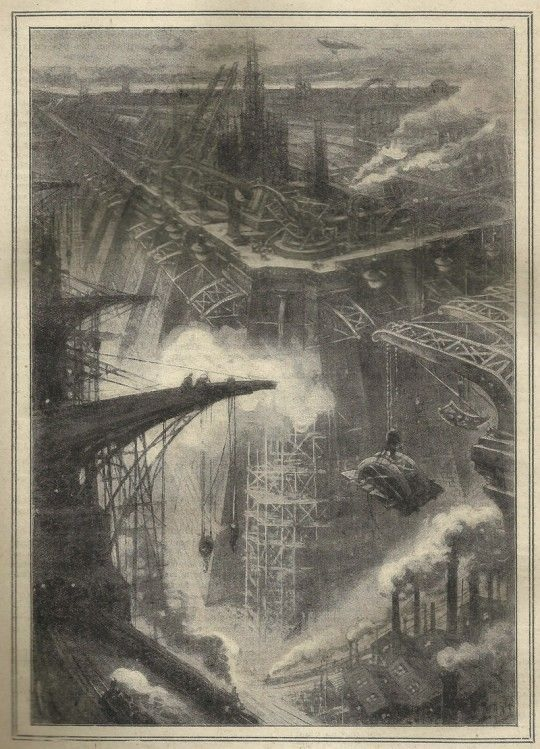
Henri Lanos illustrates Un monde sur le monde, a dystopian novel co-written with Jules Perrin and serialized in Nos loisirs magazine (1910-1911).

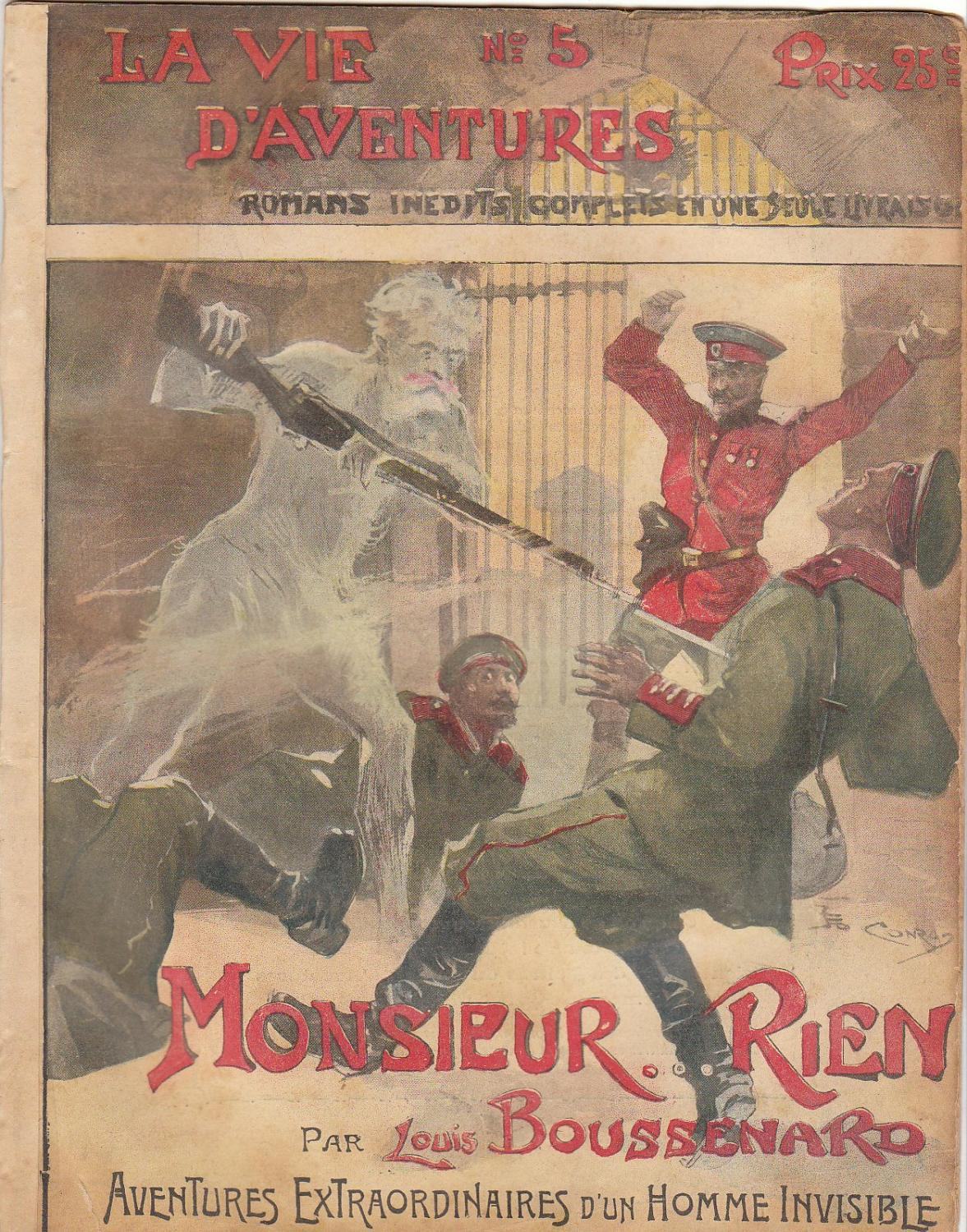
A variation on the theme of the invisible man, Monsieur... Rien! by Louis Boussenard (1907) is illustrated by Georges Conrad, a regular contributor to the "La Vie d'aventures" collection.

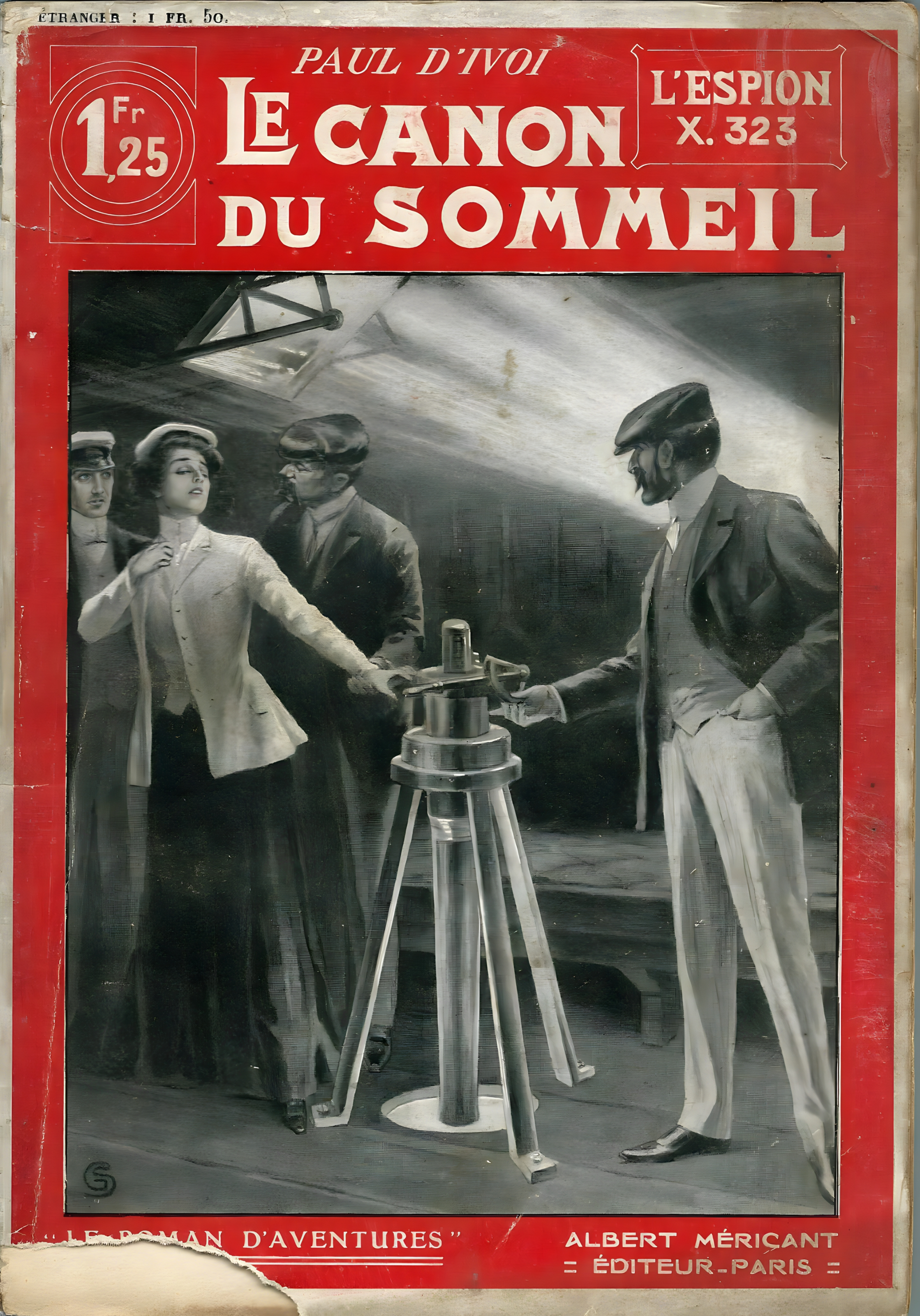
Famous illustrator of Fantômas, Gino Starace occasionally ventures into the merveilleux-scientifique genre. Cover of Paul d'Ivoi's Canon du sommeil (1908).

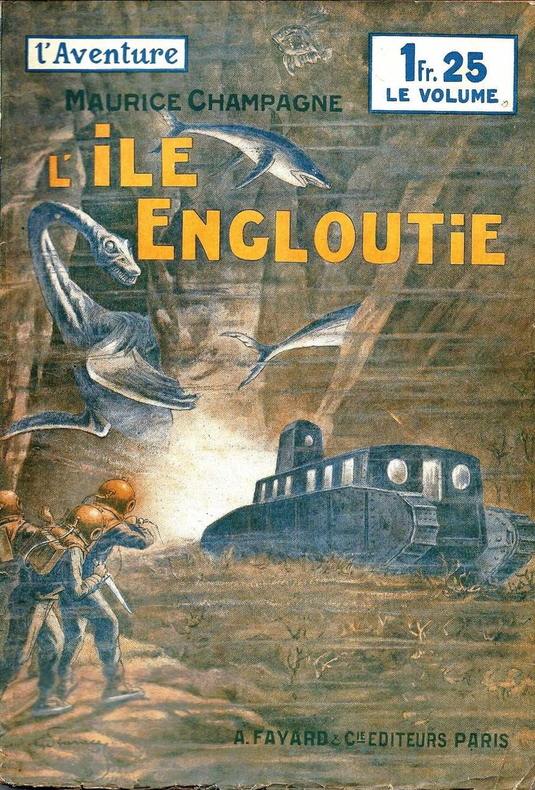
Underwater explorers and living fossils on the cover of Maurice Champagne's L'Île engloutie (1929).

=== Merveilleux scientifique theater ===
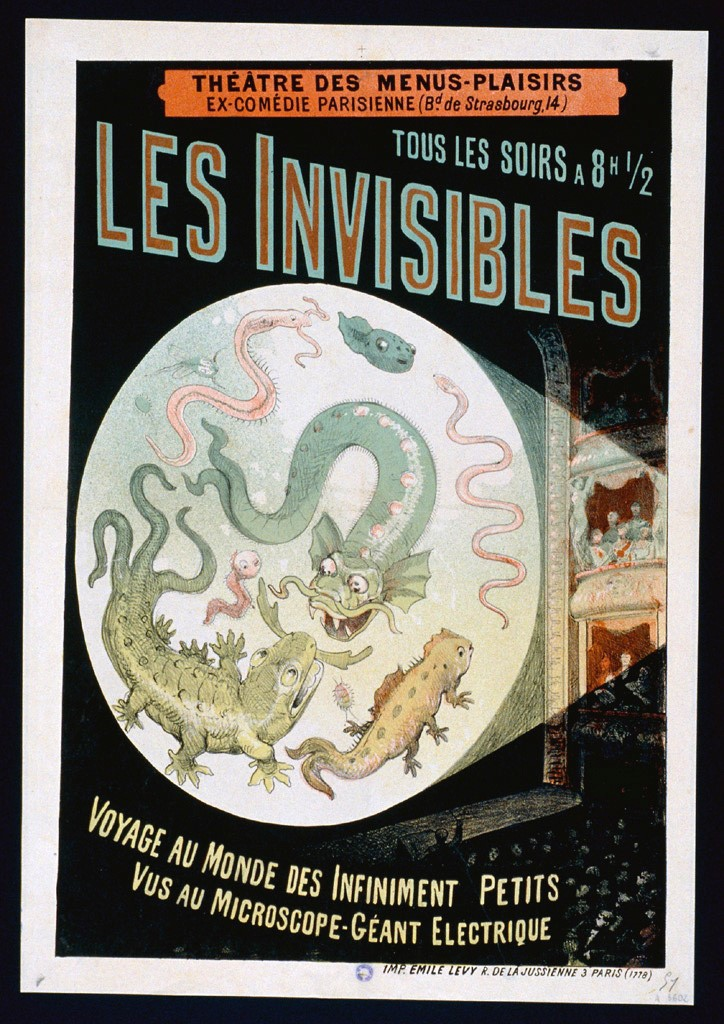
Following the example of merveilleux-scientifique tales, "Les Invisibles" features science and innovation as the tipping point into a marvelous world.

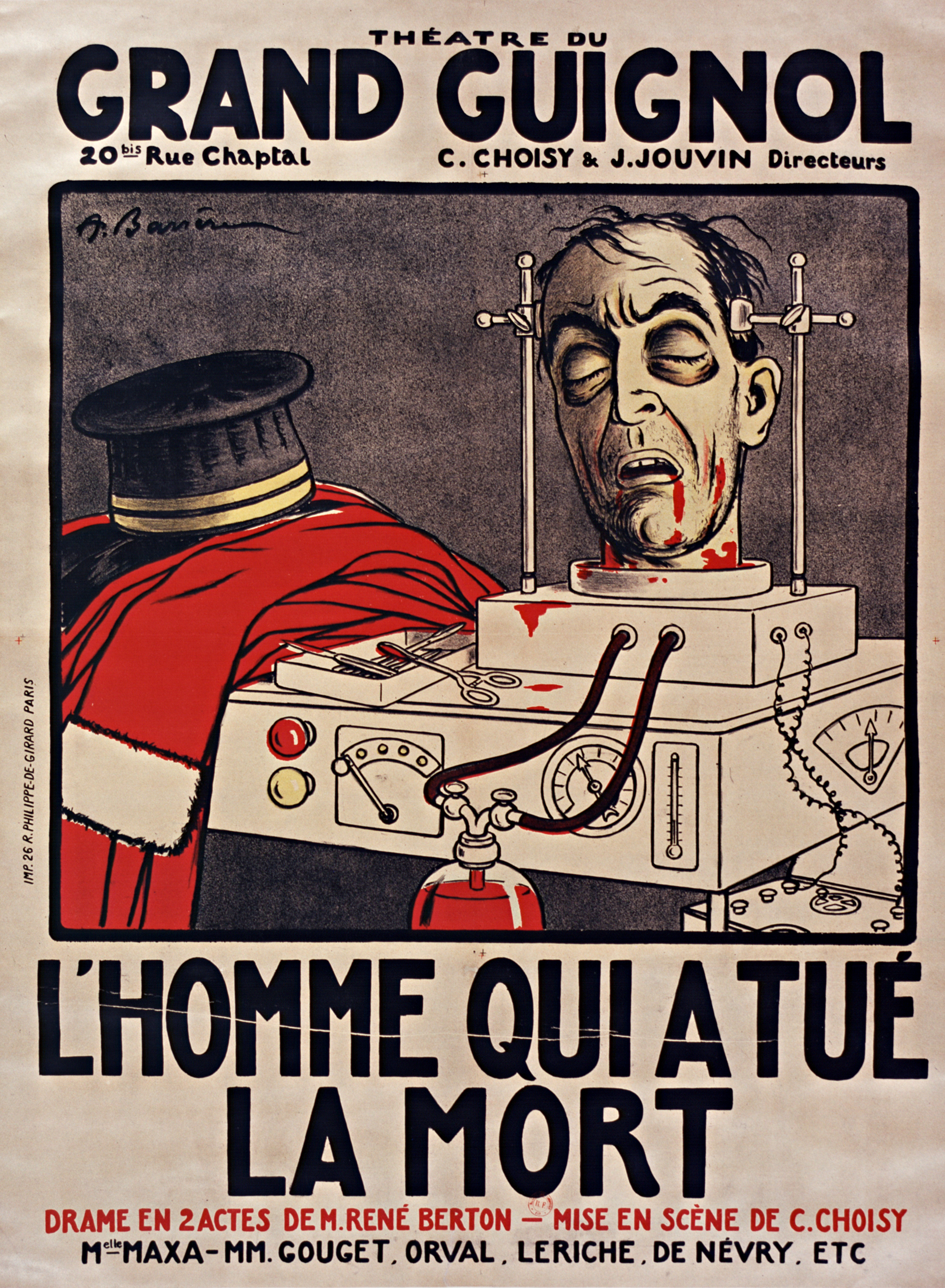
Grand-Guignol plays are occasionally rooted in the merveilleux-scientifique genre.

In October 1884, M. Bauer directed an original presentation at the Théâtre Antoine-Simone Berriau in Paris: "Les Invisibles". The performance showcased microbial life forms using a scientific apparatus that functioned as both a giant microscope and an overhead projector, projecting images on a vast white curtain. The themes explored in the show, such as personification, miniaturization, and the vision of the invisible, were popular in merveilleux-scientifique literature. The figures are elucidated by Laguerche, an actor dressed in formal attire, who assumes the part of a host and intellectual. Scientific theatre usually seeks to disseminate science via entertainment and popularization. However, "Les Invisibles" sets itself apart as it implicates the onlooker in an active capacity. The observer takes on the persona of a laboratory technician who reveals the actual protagonist of the drama: the microbe. Bauer's show falls under the classification of merveilleux-scientifique theater.

During this time, educational-scientific theater emphasized different medical disorders. Playwright André de Lorde utilized this inspiration to develop his horror performances centering on perilous mental patients, presented at the Théâtre du Grand-Guignol during the early 20th century and beyond. As the son of a doctor, André de Lorde aimed to enhance the authenticity and impact of his productions. Consequently, he partnered with psychologist Alfred Binet on five occasions to secure scientific validation. Moreover, Lorde staged eerie plays within the merveilleux-scientifique category and maintained a friendship with Maurice Renard. In "L'Horrible Expérience" (1909), a drama co-written with Binet, Dr. Charrier attempts to revive his deceased daughter, but ultimately succumbs to strangulation by her corpse. This story was likely inspired by one of Henri-Étienne Beaunis's Contes Physiologiques. Furthermore, "Le Laboratoire des Hallucinations" (1916) features a different practitioner conducting medical experiments on his wife's lover as an act of revenge.

== Decline and fall into obscurity ==
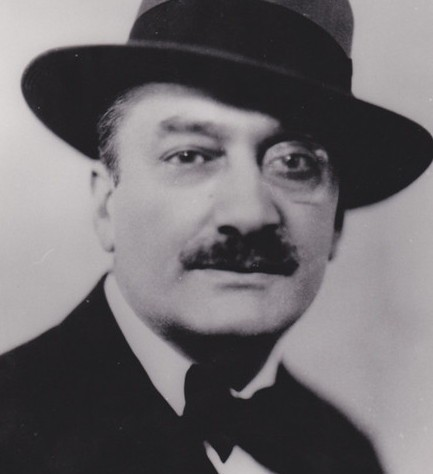
Not without bitterness, Maurice Renard was economically forced to write for a living between the wars.

The advocates of the merveilleux-scientifique genre have not succeeded in establishing a well-defined category. They did not endeavor to create a periodical or anthology labeled as such, which would not only provide the genre with coherence and unity, but also allow readers to recognize it as such. This deficiency caused the gradual decline of merveilleux scientifique in the 1930s and beyond. Despite some truly original works, the genre failed to rejuvenate itself and its themes appeared to recede. Space travel was restricted to the solar system, and scientific progress was mainly presented as a hazard rather than a social advancement. Additionally, according to writer Daniel Drode, the literary style struggles to rid itself of an academic veneer. The protagonist of such anticipation novels tends to utilize language passed down from a distant, bygone era - our own. Even when arriving at Planet X in System Y, their sentiments are conveyed using verbiage akin to that of Blériot upon disembarking from his aircraft [...] Should they depict the grandeur of Mars, it is as though Napoleon III is extolling the beauty of Biarritz. The mere thought of academician Vaugelas operating "la chronomachine" instills a sense of dread.

Furthermore, authors are producing fewer speculative stories. The most recent novel by J.-H. Rosny aîné, Les Navigateurs de l'infini, was published in 1925. (Note: Its sequel, announced the same year, was only published posthumously in 1960 under the title Les Astronautes.) Similarly, Maurice Renard, who was no longer financially comfortable after the war, spaced out his works on the subject in order to concentrate on more commercially successful stories. In his article "Depuis Sinbad" (1923), he expressed his disappointment at such economic limitations.

"There's no need to look any further to find out why Wells stopped working along the lines of La Guerre des mondes, and why Rosny aîné so rarely publishes "Xipéhuz" or Force mystérieuse. To make a living by appealing to intelligence, that, yes, would be truly fantastic!"

The two largest popular publishing houses, Ferenczi and Tallandier, make no distinction between merveilleux-scientifique novels and adventure and travel stories, giving the genre a lower profile.

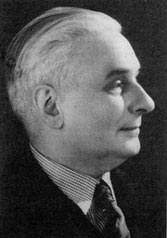
Author of novels of scientific imagination, Octave Béliard won the first Prix Jules-Verne for La petite fille de Michel Strogoff in 1927, then the Prix Maurice-Renard for Les Petits Hommes de la pinède in 1930.

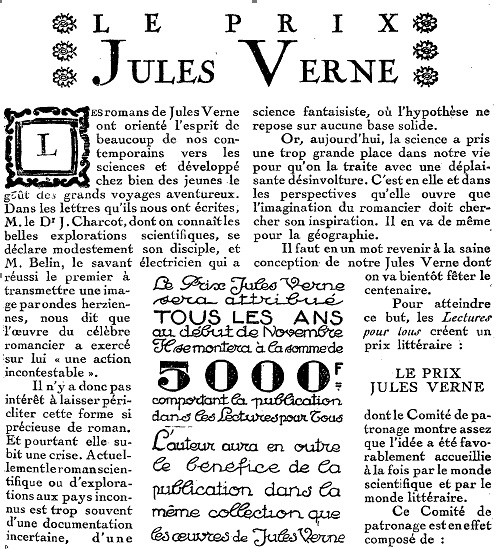
Advertisement for the Jules Verne Prize in the magazine Lectures pour Tous, April 1926.

The Prix Maurice-Renard disappeared in 1932 when Serge-Simon Held declined to accept his award, while Hachette Editions established the Prix Jules-Verne in 1927 via the Lectures pour Tous magazine. The prize's promoters aimed to rejuvenate the scientific novel's foundations by placing it under the famous novelist from Nantes's patronage. In fact, using Jules Verne as a literary reference is helpful in avoiding excessive imagination by emphasizing scientific elements over the fantastic. Additionally, employing this French literary figure serves to reinforce the legitimacy of the genre while supporting a marketing campaign to increase sales of the Hetzel collection, which has been owned by Hachette since July 1914.

In 1925, Offenstadt Brothers Publishing House lost their case against Abbé Calippe's classification of Sciences et Voyages as a hazardous magazine for young people. The ruling adversely affected not only the magazine but also all imaginative scientific literature during the interwar era, causing it to practice self-censorship. After World War II, the literature in question was censored in France (Note: The July 16, 1949 law on publications for young people aims to regulate the distribution of children's books and magazines.) due to concerns about its negative impact on young people and influence on juvenile delinquency. According to writer and essayist Serge Lehman, the "merveilleux scientifique" genre ended in 1953 with B.R. Bruss's L'Apparition des surhommes, the final identifiable novel in the genre.

Parallel to this decline, the French public discovered "science fiction", a literary genre imported from the United States by Raymond Queneau, Michel Pilotin, and Boris Vian. Its promoters presented it as modern literature created by American authors in the 1920s, of which Jules Verne was only a distant ancestor. This genre not only renewed themes of merveilleux-scientifique, but also surpassed the output of pre-war French writers. Faced with changes in the literary landscape, the younger generation of French authors adopted Anglo-Saxon themes and asserted their control over the "science fiction" genre. Writer B.R. Bruss embraced this dominant genre and explored new themes, including space exploration. As a result, the merveilleux-scientifique genre, considered inferior due to its popular appeal, faded into obscurity while Jules Verne and American authors gained prominence. In collective memory, the latter has overshadowed 50 years of imaginative scientific literature, now known as "literary Atlantis".

== Posterity ==
At the start of the 21st century, the genre of science fiction and fantasy has made a resurgence in popularity. This has been due to not only the republishing of numerous stories from previous decades but also the appropriation of its unique aesthetic and iconic characters by new writers who now have access to these public domain creations. However, the growing critical study of this speculative literature accompanies this renewed interest.

=== A look back at merveilleux scientifique ===
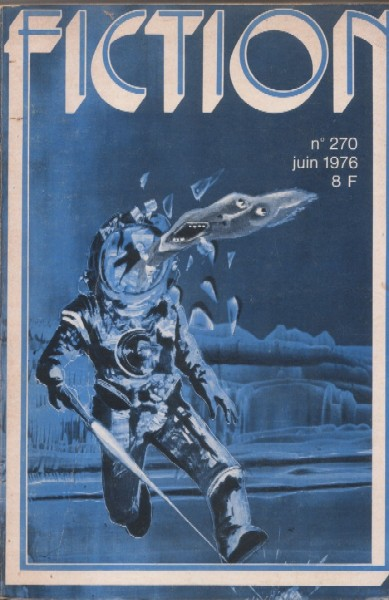
Alongside American science fiction short stories, Jean-Jacques Bridenne wrote articles in Fiction magazine in the 1950s devoted to a number of French writers of the scientific imagination.

==== Critical studies ====
In 1950, Jean-Jacques Bridenne published La Littérature française d'imagination scientifique, sharing pioneering research on novels resulting from late 19th century scientific discoveries and providing insights into the genre. The magazine Fiction also published his articles on several turn-of-the-century writers. Enthusiasts of turn-of-the-century popular literature came together in the mid-1960s to share their collections. They produced fanzines containing book listings and reviews, among which two mimeographed newsletters emerged as prominent among collectors: the publication Désiré (1965-1981) (Note: The periodical ceased publication between 1971 and 1974, then reappeared under the title Désiré, l'ami de littérature populaire with a new numbering.), edited by Jean Leclercq, and Le Chasseur d'Illustrés, renamed Le Chercheur des Publications d'autrefois in 1971, (1967-1977) by Marcel Lagneau and George Fronval. The newsletters' reputations were well-established. Beyond these circles of science fiction enthusiasts, it was not until the 1970s (Note: Hosted by Noël Arnaud, Francis Lacassin and Jean Tortel, the pioneering Entretiens sur la paralittérature symposium was held at the Centre culturel international de Cerisy-la-Salle in 1967.) that science fiction specialists delved into the production of merveilleux-scientifique works, which subsequently led to publication for general audiences. In 1973, Jacques Sadoul published Histoire de la science-fiction moderne: 1911-1971, which primarily focused on Anglo-Saxon science fiction despite acknowledging the genre's existence in Europe. Pierre Versins' Encyclopédie de l'utopie, des voyages extraordinaires et de la science-fiction (1972) and Jacques Van Herp's Panorama de la science-fiction (1974) represented the earliest comprehensive research on the genre.

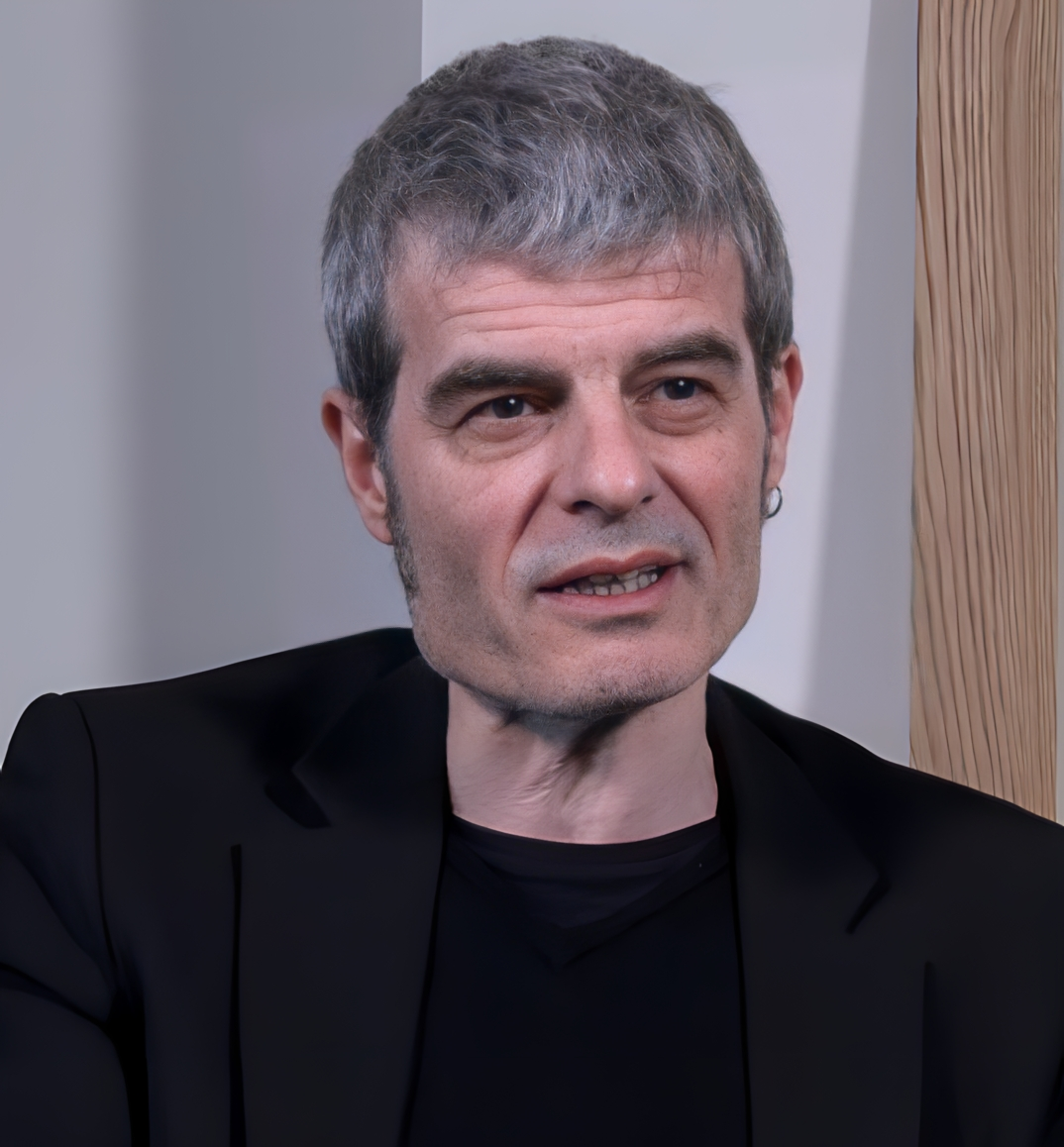
In addition to his work as an essayist and anthologist, Serge Lehman has revived characters from merveilleux-scientifique novels in the comic book series The Chimera Brigade.

Since the turn of the millennium, the public's fascination with popular serialized fiction, specifically those featuring merveilleux scientifique, has invigorated scholarly analysis of this genre. In 1999, Serge Lehman published "Les mondes perdus de l'anticipation française" in Le Monde diplomatique, bringing attention to a neglected section of French-language literary heritage. In 2006, he followed up with the publication of the short story collection "Chasseurs de chimères". The text already adheres to all the given principles and consists of a single sentence without any context to expand on. Therefore, the revised text is L'Âge d'or de la science-fiction française (The Golden Age of French Science Fiction), in which he undertakes an initial reflection on this literature of scientific imagination. A number of specialized websites, such as Philippe Ethuin's ArchéoSF and Jean-Luc Boutel's Sur l'autre face du monde, are also part of this rediscovery movement, taking stock of and critiquing these early works. In 2000, Jean-Marc Lofficier released French Science Fiction, Fantasy, Horror, and Pulp Fiction, an extensive encyclopedia in English about French-language science fiction.

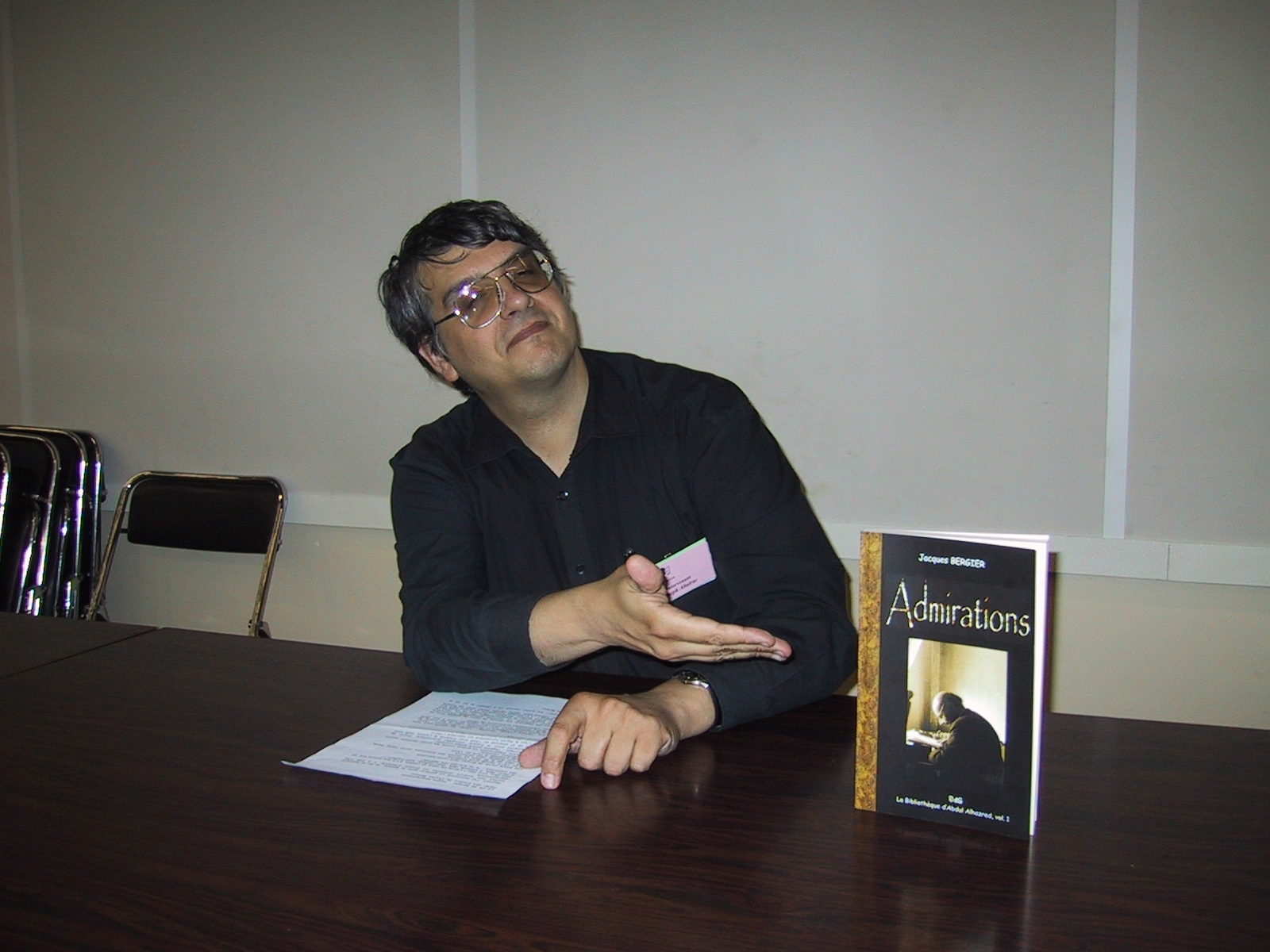
Joseph Altairac publishes in 2018, with his colleague Guy Costes, the Rétrofictions, encyclopédie de la conjecture romanesque rationnelle francophone devoted to French-speaking conjectural literature and imagery.

In the late 19th and early 20th centuries, academic literature on scientific imagination is gaining significance, and many studies are being published. Jean-Marc Gouanvic published his thesis on French science fiction in the 20th century (1900-1968) in 1994. Natacha Vas-Deyres wrote Ces Français qui ont écrit demain in 2012, followed by Daniel Fondanèche's La Littérature d'imagination scientifique in 2013. These various critical studies are supported by publications in recently established magazines focusing on popular literature such as Rocambole, Le Belphégor, Le Visage vert, and the digital magazine Res Futurae, as well as highly specialized ones like Le Téléphonoscope, which concentrates on Albert Robida and his works, and Le Quinzinzinzili, the Messacquian bulletin that examines the literary output of Régis Messac. In 2018, Guy Costes and Joseph Altairac, both science fiction specialists, published Rétrofictions, encyclopédie de la conjecture romanesque rationnelle francophone. The encyclopedia provides a comprehensive inventory of all French-language conjectural literature and imagery, paying explicit tribute to Pierre Versins' encyclopedia.

In 2019, Fleur Hopkins, an art history doctoral student, is curating an exhibition at the Bibliothèque nationale de France titled "Le merveilleux-scientifique. Une science-fiction à la française". This exhibition provides a sincere acknowledgment to the merveilleux-scientifique genre and aims to enhance its visibility amongst the general audience.

==== A literary genre in its own right ====
While merveilleux scientifique was once referred to as various names (Note: In addition to the term "merveilleux scientifique", the literature of scientific imagination of the early 20th century is also known as "hypothesis novels", "anticipation novels", "chimerical", "extraordinary", etc.) for imaginative scientific literature in the early 20th century, by the post-war years it became closely associated with the science fiction genre. During this time period, it was commonly called "proto-science fiction", "ancient science fiction", or "primitive science fiction" as it introduced themes found in modern science fiction that emerged in the United States from the 1920s onwards. This link between scientific advancements - identified as the "golden age of French science fiction" by Serge Lehman - and post-war science fiction is evident through their mutual focus on specific themes such as encounters with extraterrestrial life, creation and integration of artificial or augmented beings, and catastrophic events. Certain merveilleux-scientifique novels share similar themes and a narratological character that brings them closer to science-fiction narratives. The novels by Rosny aîné, for example, depict a universe unlike our own, forcing readers to reconstruct their frames of reference to follow the story.

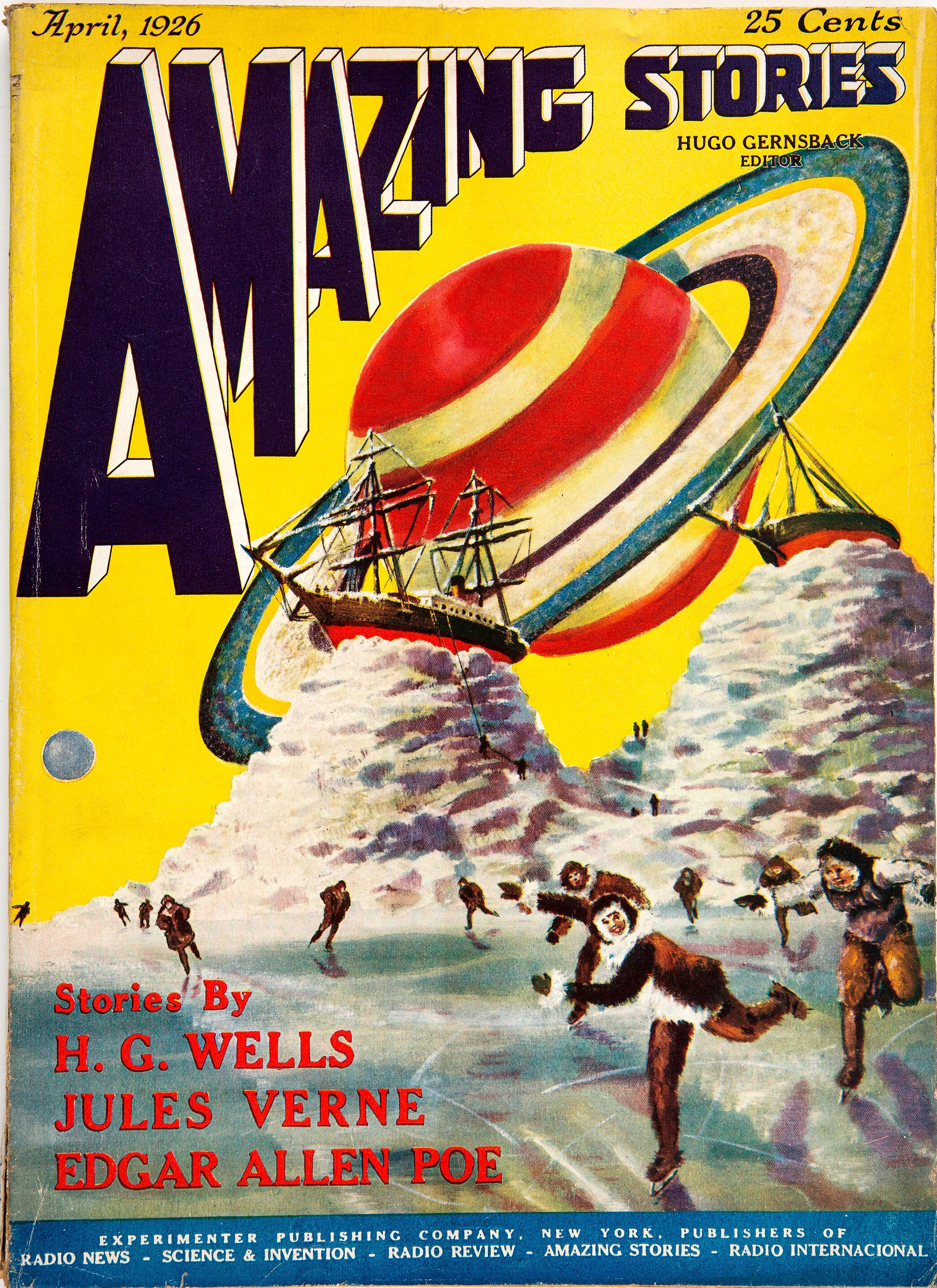
In April 1926, Hugo Gernsback founded Amazing Stories, the first magazine devoted exclusively to science fiction.

However, some researchers challenge the notion that merveilleux scientifique equals "proto-science fiction." Indeed, the interpretation that merveilleux scientifique is merely a genre under construction stems from a teleological viewpoint. However, this interpretation not only erases its own distinct characteristics, but also disregards the fact that it is influenced by various literary traditions, such as the experimental novel, fantasy, and the scientific adventure novel. While discussing scientifiction's (Note: Hugo Gernsback first used and popularized the term "science fiction" in 1929, in an editorial for the magazine Science Wonder Stories.) definition in Amazing Stories magazine, Hugo Gernsback cites Edgar Allan Poe, Jules Verne, and H.G. Wells as its models but fails to reference any authors of merveilleux-scientifique novels, denying any connection between the two genres. Despite sharing common ancestors and characteristics, merveilleux scientifique and science fiction exhibit significant differences. For instance, the interwar period's merveilleux-scientifique novel portrays a pessimistic view of science, different from the essentially optimistic discourse of Anglo-Saxon science fiction.

=== A century of discontinuous reissues ===
Two significant periods in the republishing of fantastic scientific classics emerged simultaneously with critical works. During the 1960s, a favorable time for French science fiction, the initial massive wave of republications focused on collections of science fiction literature. This resurgence could either be in response to the dominance of Anglo-Saxon science fiction or simply a yearning for a more innocent form of the genre, and although the books were still catered to a niche audience, they were published on a much bigger scale. A second wave of reprints in science fiction literature emerged in the 21st century, with small publishing houses such as L'Arbre vengeur, Bragelonne, Encrage, Les Moutons électriques, and Black Coat Press leading the way. In this regard, Jean-Marc Lofficier publishes in both English and French languages through his American-owned publishing company, Black Coat Press. The French-language collection is known as Rivière Blanche (editorial).

=== Genre update ===
From the mid-20th century onward, the merveilleux-scientifique genre survived only marginally due to the onslaught of American science fiction. René Barjavel and Maurice Limat were instrumental in keeping the genre alive. Barjavel, who claims to be the sole heir of Jules Verne and H. G. Wells, has never used the label 'merveilleux-scientifique'.

Gérard Desarthe as the mad scientist Cornélius Kramm in the miniseries Le Mystérieux Docteur Cornélius (1984) by Maurice Frydland.

Paradoxically, while French cinema was also abandoning the genre, it found a new home on television after the war in the form of several successful television shows. The tradition of French televisual fantasy, which was developed thanks to technical innovations that allowed for the creation of live-action fakery, reached its peak in the 1960s and 1970s before declining in the mid-1980s. Exploiting the soap opera genre, TV movies rely heavily on adaptations of science-fiction novels, exemplified by La Poupée sanglante (1976) directed by Marcel Cravenne, La Double Vie de Théophraste Longuet (1981) by Yannick Andréi, and Le Mystérieux Docteur Cornélius (1984) by Maurice Frydland. It relies on successful original creations, including the series Aux frontières du possible (1971-1974), which blends elements of a detective series and scientific anticipation, and La Brigade des Maléfices (1971), which combines detective and fantasy genres, as well as the soap opera Les Compagnons de Baal (1968), which chronicles the esoteric adventures of a journalist controlled by a secret society.

If the label "merveilleux scientifique" no longer appears in literature, the foundation of the genre remains intact: the encounter between a human and an extraordinary element, be it an object, a creature, or a physical phenomenon. This principle is handed down to future generations of authors. Authors like René Barjavel (Ashes, Ashes, 1943), Pierre Boulle (Planet of the Apes, 1963), and Robert Merle (Les Hommes protégés, 1974) drew inspiration from this heritage and reinterpreted it. Even more recently, authors like Bernard Werber (Empire of the Ants, 1991-1996) and Michel Houellebecq (Atomised, 1998) have continued to do so. In the second half of the 20th century, nascent French science fiction (SF) claimed to exclusively hail from the genre across the Atlantic. However, it was actually the result of multiple currents, with marvelous sci-fi serving as just one.

Jacques Tardi's The Arctic Marauder (1974).

In addition to this contemporary science-fiction, which is influenced by both French and Anglo-Saxon traditions, a fully-developed merveilleux scientifique reemerged at the beginning of the 21st century. This genre mainly resurfaced through the medium of comics. It endured informally during the latter half of the 20th century, particularly with Edgar P. Jacobs began with the adventures of Blake and Mortimer in 1946, followed by Jacques Tardi's The Arctic Marauder in 1974 and The Extraordinary Adventures of Adèle Blanc-Sec series in 1976, both of which reuse markers of merveilleux scientifique, such as the resurgence of prehistoric animals. Another Belgian author duo, François Schuiten and Benoît Peeters, published Les Cités obscures from 1983, which reflects the influence of Jules Verne and Albert Robida. Finally, a resurgence of merveilleux scientifique occurred through the release of the comic series The Chimera Brigade (2009-2010) by authors Serge Lehman and Fabrice Colin. This work serves as both a tribute to classical literature and a modern reinterpretation, presenting numerous European literary superheroes from the early 20th century while also elucidating their disappearance after the events of World War II and the more general concealment of scientific imagination in literary works. Following this series, Serge Lehman updates the genre with three comics - L'Homme truqué (2013), adapting the short story and novel of the same name by Maurice Renard; L'Œil de la Nuit (2015-2016), featuring the adventures of the Nyctalope; and Masqué (2012-2013), which showcases a resurgence of merveilleux scientifique in the near future.

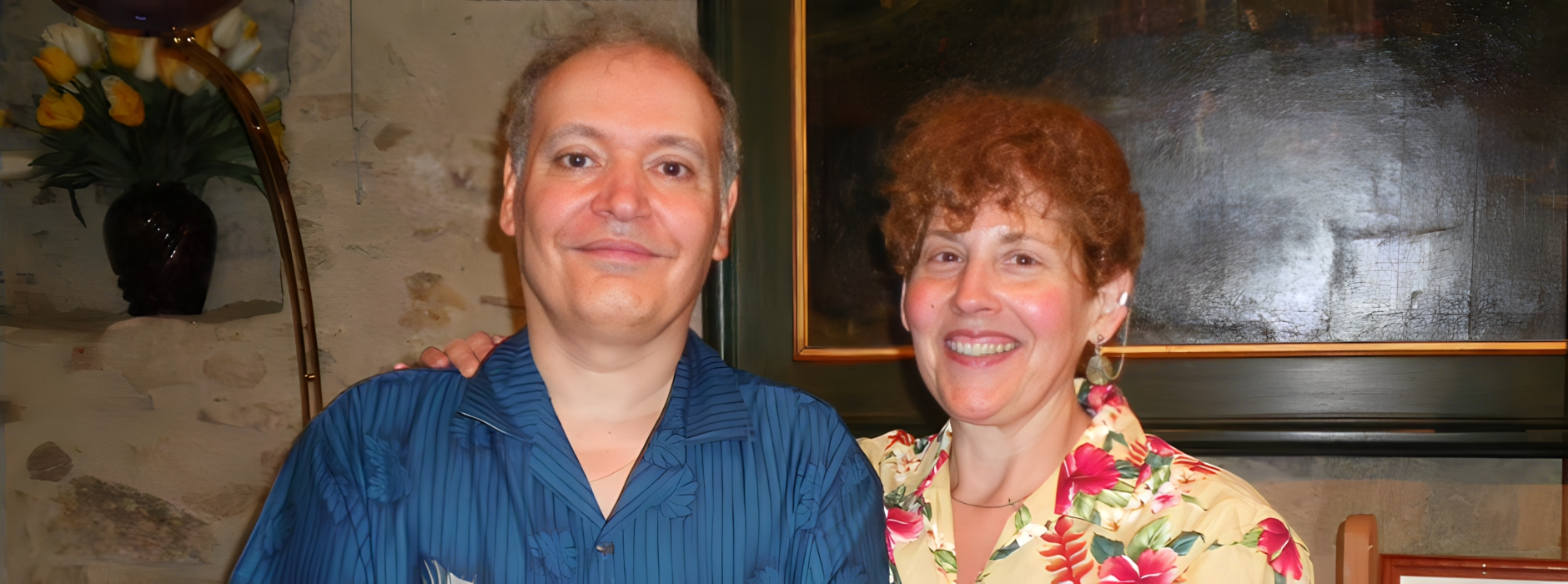
Jean-Marc Lofficier and his wife Randy are contributing to the rediscovery of the merveilleux-scientifique genre with an encyclopedic work, English translations of key works in the genre, and anthologies of short stories and essays published by Black Coat Press.

Among the new generation of authors who resurrect literary heritage, Xavier Dorison and Enrique Breccia introduce mechanically enhanced super-soldiers during World War I in Les Sentinelles (2008-2014), Jean-Marc Lofficier and Gil Formosa tackle Jules Verne's character in Robur (comic) (2003-2005), and Alex Alice delves into the mysteries of the ether in Le Château des étoiles (since 2014). These authors do not simply set their narratives in the Belle Époque or rely on familiar literary figures. Rather, they resurrect several important themes of the genre, including exploration, war, and fantastical inventions. Some even adopt a periodical format, as in Le Château des Étoiles, which was originally published in fascicles as a nod to the 19th-century feuilleton tradition.

Since 2005, Black Coat Press has been publishing the anthology series "Tales of the Shadowmen", in addition to its reprint work. These collections comprise short stories that narrate the journeys of heroes and villains from popular culture during the 19th and 20th centuries. Furthermore, starting from 2007, the series has been available in French under the title "Les Compagnons de l'Ombre" within the Rivière Blanche collection. Since 2015, the collection has published an anthological series of short stories titled "Dimension merveilleux scientifique." The short stories, written by various authors, intend to revive the French-language literary genre that has lost popularity.

This renewed fascination with scientific advancements appears to be a facet of the wider steampunk trend, an uchronian genre of alternative history literature that emerged during the 1990s, reimagining a past, particularly the 19th century, in which technological progress rapidly advanced and became firmly established. The scientific phenomenon is resurfacing alongside various literary genres, including steampunk and gaslamp fantasy. Prominent authors of these genres include Mathieu Gaborit and Fabrice Colin with Confessions d'un automate mangeur d'opium (1999), Pierre Pevel with his Paris des Merveilles cycle (2003-2015), and Estelle Faye with Un éclat de givre (2014). These authors are considered to be the most representative proponents of the early 21st century.

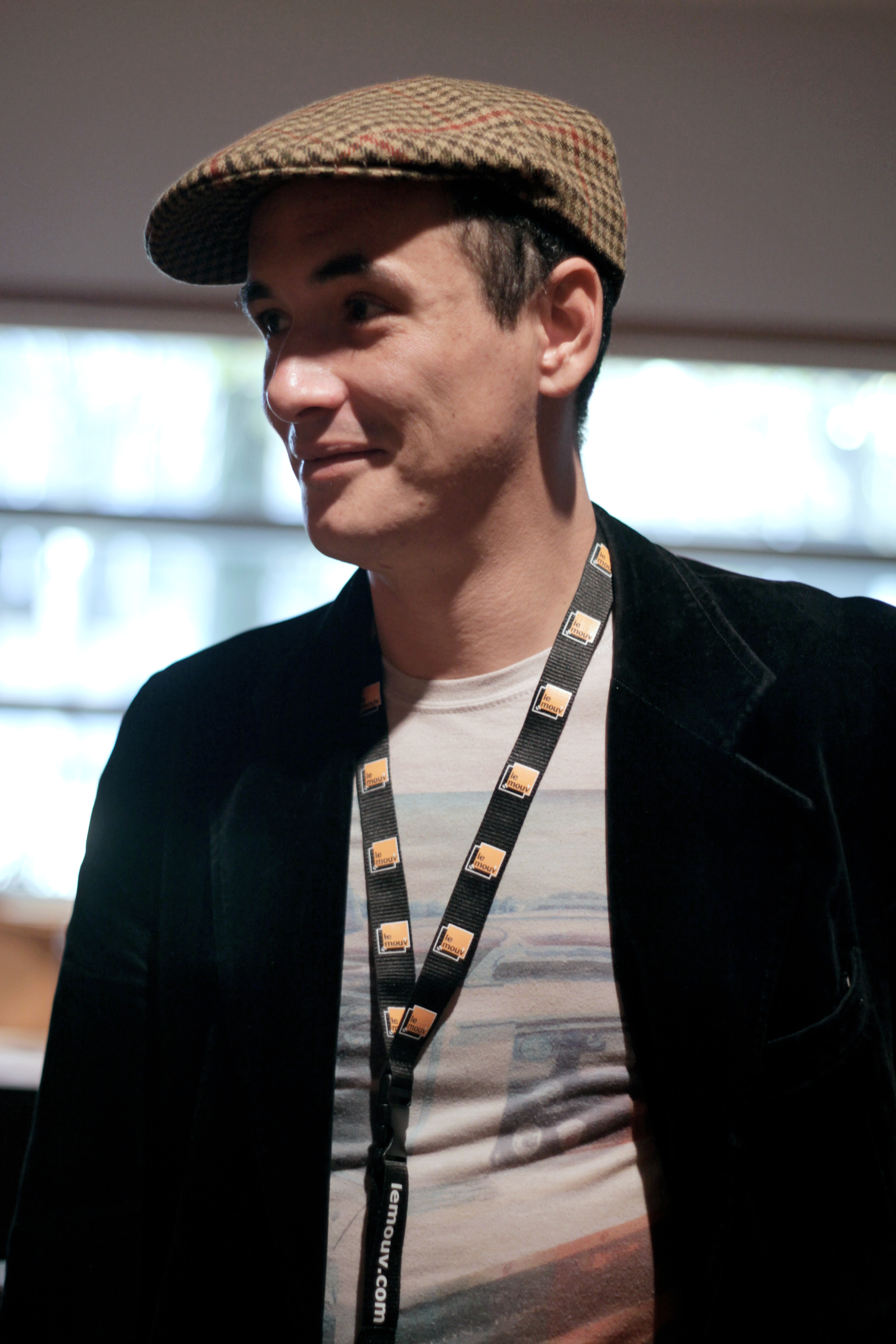
Mathieu Gaborit.

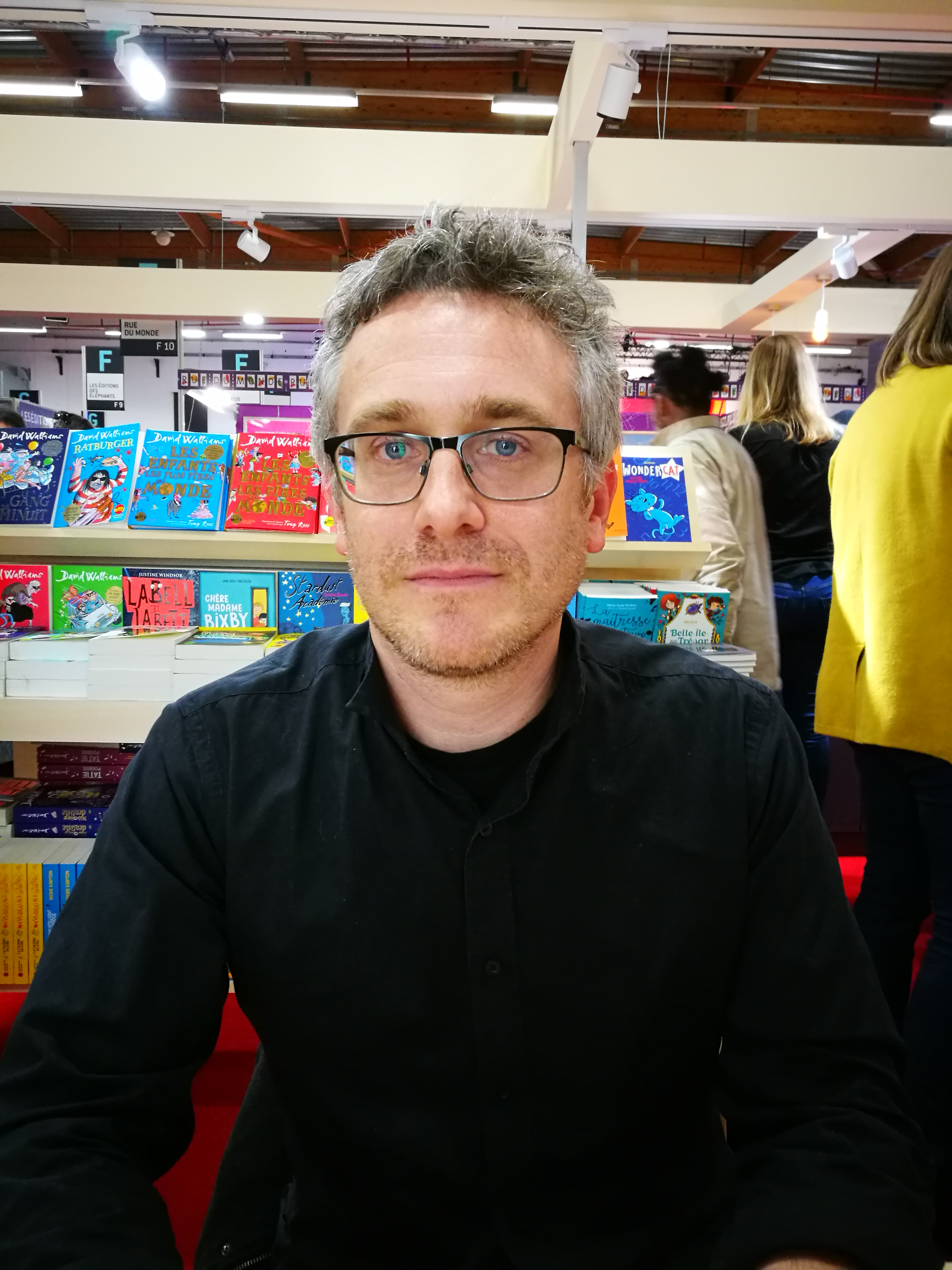
Fabrice Colin.

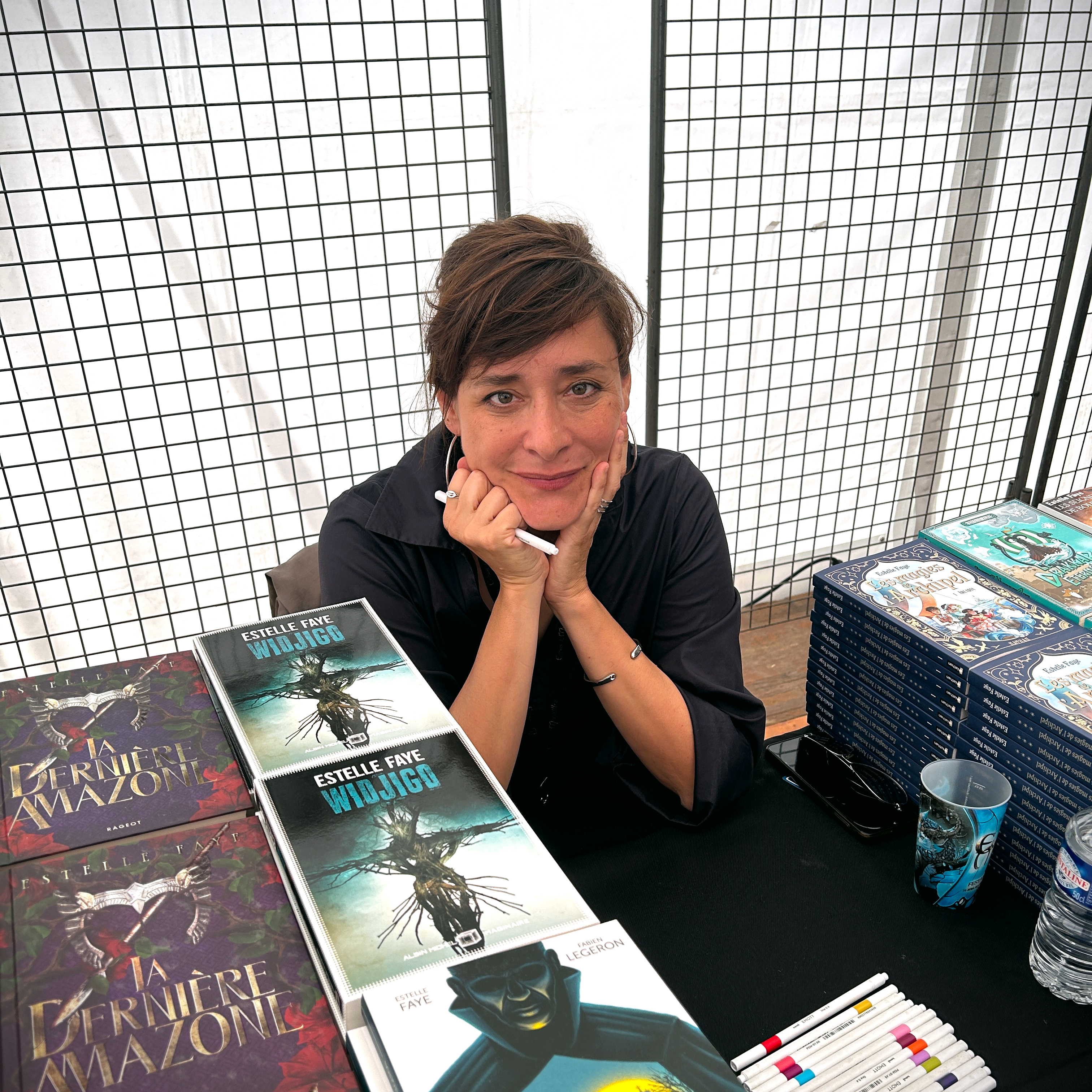
Estelle Faye.

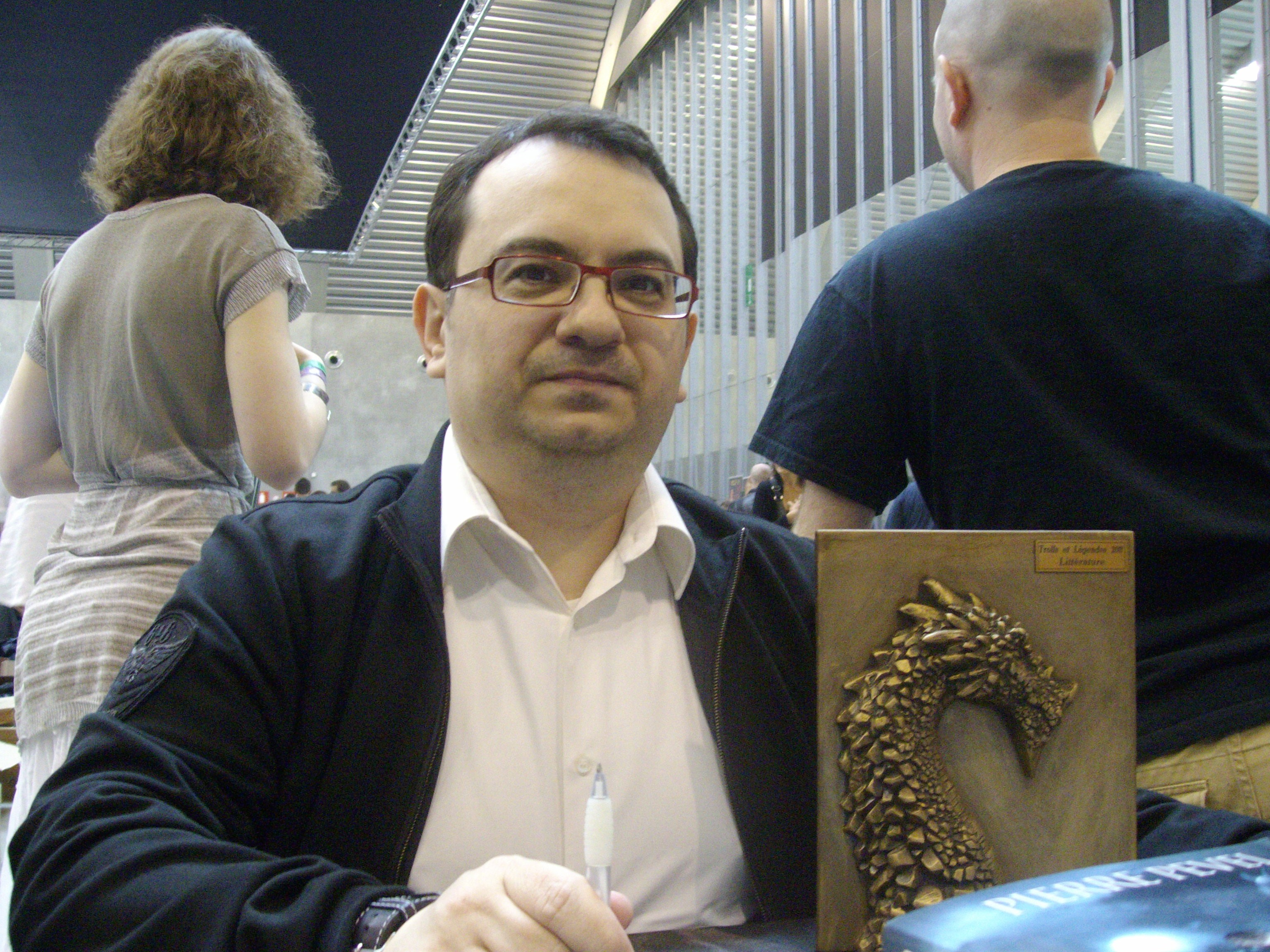
In Le Paris des Merveilles, Pierre Pevel imagines the adventures of magician Louis Denizart Hippolyte Griffont in the early 20th century.

== Bibliography ==
=== Primary sources ===
- (In French) Maurice Renard, "Du roman merveilleux-scientifique and de son action sur l'intelligence du progrès", Le Spectateur, no 6, October 1909, pp. 245–261 (read online archive).
  - Manifesto in which Maurice Renard defines the merveilleux-scientifique novel.
- (In French) Maurice Renard, "Le Merveilleux scientifique and La Force mystérieuse de J.-H. Rosny aîné", La Vie, no 16, 15 june 1914, pp. 544–548 (read online archive).
  - In this review of Rosny aîné's La Force mystérieuse, Maurice Renard expands on his seminal 1909 article.
- (In French) Hubert Matthey, Essai sur le merveilleux dans la littérature Française depuis 1800, Paris, Librairie Payot, 1915 (read online archive).
  - A contemporary work in which Hubert Matthey analyzes the merveilleux-scientifique genre and draws up a chronological table of related works.
- (In French) Maurice Renard, "Le roman d'hypothèse", A.B.C., no. 48, December 1928, pp. 345–346 (read online archive).
  - In this article, Maurice Renard renames the term "merveilleux-scientifique" "novel of hypothesis" to extend the genre's epistemological scope.
- Serge Lehman, "Les mondes perdus de l'anticipation française", Le Monde diplomatique, july 1999, pp. 28–29 (read online archive).
  - A pioneering article in the rediscovery of the merveilleux-scientifique genre.

=== Publications ===
- (In French) Claire Barel-Moisan (dir.) and Jean-François Chassay (dir.), Le roman des possibles: l'anticipation dans l'espace médiatique francophone (1860-1940), Montréal, Presses de l'Université de Montréal, coll. "Cavales", 2019, 483 pp. (ISBN 978-2-7606-4017-7).
- (In French) Jacques Baudou and Jean-Jacques Schleret, Merveilleux, fantastique et science-fiction à la télévision française, Bry-sur-Marne / Paris, INA / Huitième art, coll. "Les dossiers du 8e art", 1995, 183 pp. (ISBN 978-2-908905-09-0).
- (In French) Jean-Luc Boutel, Merveilleux scientifique, Bordeaux, Les Moutons électriques, coll. "Artbooks féeriques", 2020, 96 pp. (ISBN 978-2-36183-646-7, online presentation archive on the NooSFere website).
- Bréan, Simon (2012). La Science-fiction en France: Théorie et histoire d'une littérature. Lettres françaises (in French). Paris: Presses Université Paris-Sorbonne. ISBN 978-2-84050-851-9.
- (In French) Guy Costes and Joseph Altairac (préf. Gérard Klein), Rétrofictions, encyclopédie de la conjecture romanesque rationnelle francophone, de Rabelais à Barjavel, 1532-1951, t. 1: lettres A à L, t. 2: lettres M à Z, Amiens / Paris, Encrage / Les Belles Lettres, coll. "Interface" (no 5), 2018, 2458 pp. (ISBN 978-2-251-44851-0).
- (In French) Jean-Marc Gouanvic, La science-fiction française au xxe siècle (1900-1968): essai de socio-poétique d'un genre en émergence, Amsterdam, Rodopi, coll. "Faux titre: études de langue et littérature françaises" (no 91), 1994, 292 pp. (ISBN 978-90-5183-775-9, JSTOR 20719637; archive).
- (In French) Natacha Vas-Deyres, Ces Français qui ont écrit demain: utopie, anticipation et science-fiction au xxe siècle, Paris, Honoré Champion, coll. "Bibliothèque de littérature générale et comparée" (no 103), 2013, 533 pp. (ISBN 978-2-7453-2371-2, online presentation archive).
- (In French) Natacha Vas-Deyres (dir.), Patrick Bergeron (dir.) and Patrick Guay (dir.), C'était demain: anticiper la science-fiction en France et au Québec (1880-1950), Pessac, Presses universitaires de Bordeaux, coll. "Eidôlon" (no 123), 2018, 423 pp. (ISBN 979-10-91052-24-5, online presentation archive).
- (In French) Pierre Versins, Encyclopédie de l'utopie, des voyages extraordinaires et de la science-fiction, Lausanne, L' ge d'Homme, 1972, 1037 pp. (ISBN 978-2-8251-2965-4).

=== Articles ===
==== Merveilleux scientifique: generalities ====
- (In French) ^{[Boutel 2015]} Jean-Luc Boutel, "La littérature d'imagination scientifique: genèse et continuité d'un genre", in Jean-Guillaume Lanuque (dir.), Dimension Merveilleux scientifique, Encino (Calif.), Black Coat Press, coll. "Rivière Blanche", 2015 (ISBN 978-1-61227-438-6), pp. 295–356.
- (In French) ^{[Bréan 2015]} Simon Bréan, "Fuir l'exotisme: l'"aventure nostalgique" du merveilleux-scientifique français", Nineteenth-Century French Studies, vol. 43, nos 3-4, printemps-été 2015, pp. 194–208 (doi:10.1353/ncf.2015.0010).
- Lanuque, Jean-Guillaume (2018). Dimension merveilleux scientifique. Rivière blanche. Encino (Calif.): Black coat press. ISBN 978-1-61227-749-3.
- (In French) ^{[Chaperon 2001]} Danielle Chaperon, "Du roman expérimental au merveilleux-scientifique: Science et fiction en France autour de 1900", Europe: Revue littéraire mensuelle, vol. 870, october 2001, pp. 51–63.
- (In French) ^{[Deherly 2019]} Françoise Deherly, "De la physiognomonie à la phrénologie" archive, in the Gallica blog, 19 june 2019 (accessed 22 june 2020).
- ^{[Evans 2018a]} Arthur B. Evans (trad. Patrick Dusoulier), "Science-fiction et fiction scientifique en France: de Jules Verne à J.-H. Rosny aîné", ReS Futurae, vol. 11, 2018 (doi:10.4000/resf.1406, read online archive).
- ^{[Gordon 1988]} Rae Beth Gordon, "Le Merveilleux scientifique" and the Fantastic", L'Esprit Créateur, vol. 28, 1988, pp. 9–22 (JSTOR 26285956; archive).
- (In French) ^{[Hopkins 2018a]} Fleur Hopkins, "Généalogie et postérité du genre merveilleux-scientifique (1875-2017): apparitions, déformations et complexités d'une expression", in Jean-Guillaume Lanuque (dir.), Dimension Merveilleux scientifique 4, Encino (Calif.), Black Coat Press, coll. "Rivière Blanche", 2018 (ISBN 978-1-61227-749-3), pp. 241–259.
- (In French) ^{[Hopkins 2019a]} Fleur Hopkins, "Approche épistémocritique du merveilleux-scientifique", Romantisme, Armand Colin, vol. 183, january 2019, pp. 66–78 (ISBN 978-2-200-93228-2, read online archive).
- (In French) ^{[Hopkins 2019b]} Fleur Hopkins, "Le merveilleux-scientifique: une Atlantide littéraire" archive, in the Gallica blog, 30 april 2019 (accessed 21 june 2020).
- (In French) ^{[Hopkins 2019c]} Fleur Hopkins, "Le merveilleux-scientifique dans le paysage littéraire français" archive, in the Gallica blog, 21 may 2019 (accessed 22 june 2020).
- (In French) ^{[Hopkins 2019d]} Fleur Hopkins, "L'illustration merveilleuse-scientifique dans la presse de vulgarisation. Entre didactisme et enchantement", Revue de la BNF, no 58, january 2019, pp. 100–111 (ISBN 978-2-7177-2795-1, read online archive).
- (In French) ^{[Huftier 2003]} Arnaud Huftier, "Déliquescence et déplacement du merveilleux scientifique dans l'entre-deux-guerres: Maurice Renard, André Couvreur et Rosny aîné", in Arnaud Huftier (dir.), La Belgique: un jeu de cartes?, Valenciennes, Presses universitaires de Valenciennes, coll. "Lez Valenciennes" (no 33), 2003, 304 pp. (ISBN 978-2-905725-57-8), pp. 75–132.
- (In French) ^{[Hummel 2017]} Clément Hummel, "Rosny aîné et le fantasme de l'âge d'or de l'anticipation française", Academia.edu, 2017, p. 24 (read online archive).
- (In French) ^{[Lanuque 2015]} Jean-Guillaume Lanuque, "Le retour du refoulé? Sur le renouveau du merveilleux scientifique", in Jean-Guillaume Lanuque (dir.), Dimension Merveilleux scientifique, Encino (Calif.), Black Coat Press, coll. "Rivière Blanche", 2015 (ISBN 978-1-61227-438-6), pp. 359–377.
- (In French) ^{[Lanuque 2018]} Jean-Guillaume Lanuque, "La bande-dessinée, avenir du merveilleux-scientifique?", in Jean-Guillaume Lanuque (dir.), Dimension Merveilleux scientifique 4, Encino (Calif.), Black Coat Press, coll. "Rivière Blanche", 2018 (ISBN 978-1-61227-749-3), pp. 87–302.
- (In French) ^{[Lehman 2006]} Serge Lehman, "Hypermondes perdus", in Chasseurs de chimères, l'âge d'or de la science-fiction française, Paris, Omnibus, 2006 (ISBN 978-2-258-07048-6), pp. I-XXV.
- (In French) ^{[Marron 2018]} Mathilde Marron, "Université de l'Imaginaire: Fleur Hopkins et Les Invisibles" archive, in ActuSF, 12 april 2018.
- (In French) ^{[Musnik 2019]} Roger Musnik, "De Jules Verne à Maurice Renard: les précurseurs" archive, in the Gallica blog, 4 june 2019 (accessed 22 june 2020).

==== Novel: Le Merveilleux-scientifique selon Maurice Renard ====
- (In French) ^{[Chabot 2018]} Hugues Chabot, "Merveilleux-scientifique et merveilleux-logique chez Maurice Renard: une épistémologie romancée?", ReS Futurae, vol. 11, 2018 (doi:10.4000/resf.1278, read online; archive).
- (In French) ^{[Evans 2018b]} Arthur B. Evans, "La science-fiction fantastique de Maurice Renard", ReS Futurae, vol. 11, 2018 (doi:10.4000/resf.1439, read online; archive).
- (In French) ^{[Hopkins 2018b]} Fleur Hopkins, "Écrire un "conte à structure savante": apparition, métamorphoses et déclin du récit merveilleux-scientifique dans l'œuvre de Maurice Renard (1909-1931)", ReS Futurae, vol. 11, 2018 (doi:10.4000/resf.1296, read online; archive).
- (In French) ^{[Pézard 2018a]} Émilie Pézard, "Défense et illustration d'un genre. Le merveilleux scientifique défini par Maurice Renard (1909-1928)", ReS Futurae, vol. 11, 2018 (doi:10.4000/resf.1383, read online; archive).
- (In French) ^{[Pézard 2018b]} Émilie Pézard, "L'ombre de la merveille. Le merveilleux scientifique au second degré de Maurice Renard", ReS Futurae, vol. 11, 2018 (doi:10.4000/resf.1312).
- (In French) ^{[Van Herp 1956]} Jacques Van Herp, "Maurice Renard, scribe de miracles", Fiction, OPTA, no 28, march 1956, pp. 107–110.
