= Jesus Insulted by the Soldiers =

Painting by Édouard Manet

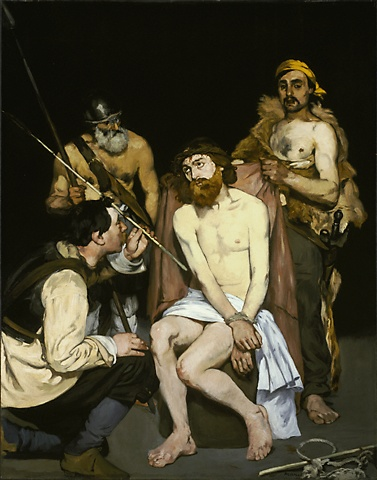
- Artist: Édouard Manet
- Year: 1865
- Medium: Oil on canvas
- Dimensions: 191.5 cm × 148.3 cm (75.4 in × 58.4 in)
- Location: Art Institute of Chicago; Chicago

Jesus Insulted by the Soldiers is an 1865 oil on canvas painting by Édouard Manet, his last religious work. It is now in the Art Institute of Chicago, to which it was left in 1925 by James Deering, heir to the Deering Harvester Company (International Harvester).

According to Théophile Thoré-Burger, the painting was based on Anthony van Dyck's Christ Crowned with Thorns (destroyed in Berlin in 1945, though a version of it survives in the Princeton University Art Museum). Other authors argue it draws on Titian's 1542–43 work of the same title, now in the Louvre. In 1959 Michel Leiris noted its similarities to an engraving by Schelte Adams Bolswert, whilst Theodore Reff saw it as influenced by Ecce homo (Madrid, Prado Museum) or Christ Mocked by the Soldiers, both by Van Dyck. Julius Meier-Graefe also noted the influence of Diego Velázquez on the work and Ann Coffin Hanson that of Hendrick ter Brugghen.

This work and his The Dead Christ with Angels (1864) were adjudged violent and insufficiently academic by art critics and the public. Paul de Saint-Victor referred to the 1865 work as "the horrible Ecce Homo by Monsieur Manet". Manet's usual critics such as Bertall, Cham, André Gill, Draner, Stop and Albert Robida also attacked the work in Le Charivari, the Journal amusant , Le Monde pour rire, L'Éclipse (replaced by the La Lune), Le Tintamarre, La Vie parisienne and several other publications.

In his 1872 inventory of his works, Manet valued the work at 15,000 francs. It was put on sale in 1883 but was withdrawn from the sale before finally being bought from Léon Leehoff by the art dealers Boussod and Valadon in 1893. According to Tabarant, it was Durand-Ruel who bought it from Manet's widow, but Durand-Ruel's records show he bought the work jointly with Jean-Baptiste Faure in 1894, Faure exhibited it in New York and finally Durand-Ruel sold it for 22,000 francs to James Deering.

== Gallery ==
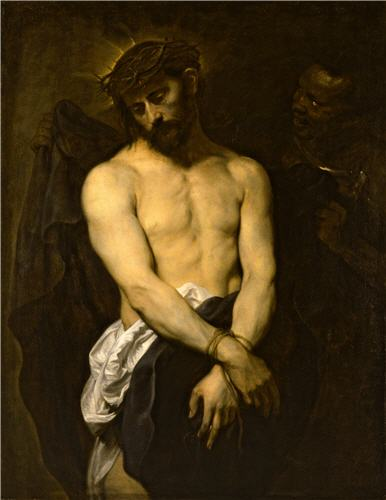
Anthony van Dyck, Ecce homo (c. 1625–1626), Birmingham, Barber Institute of Fine Arts

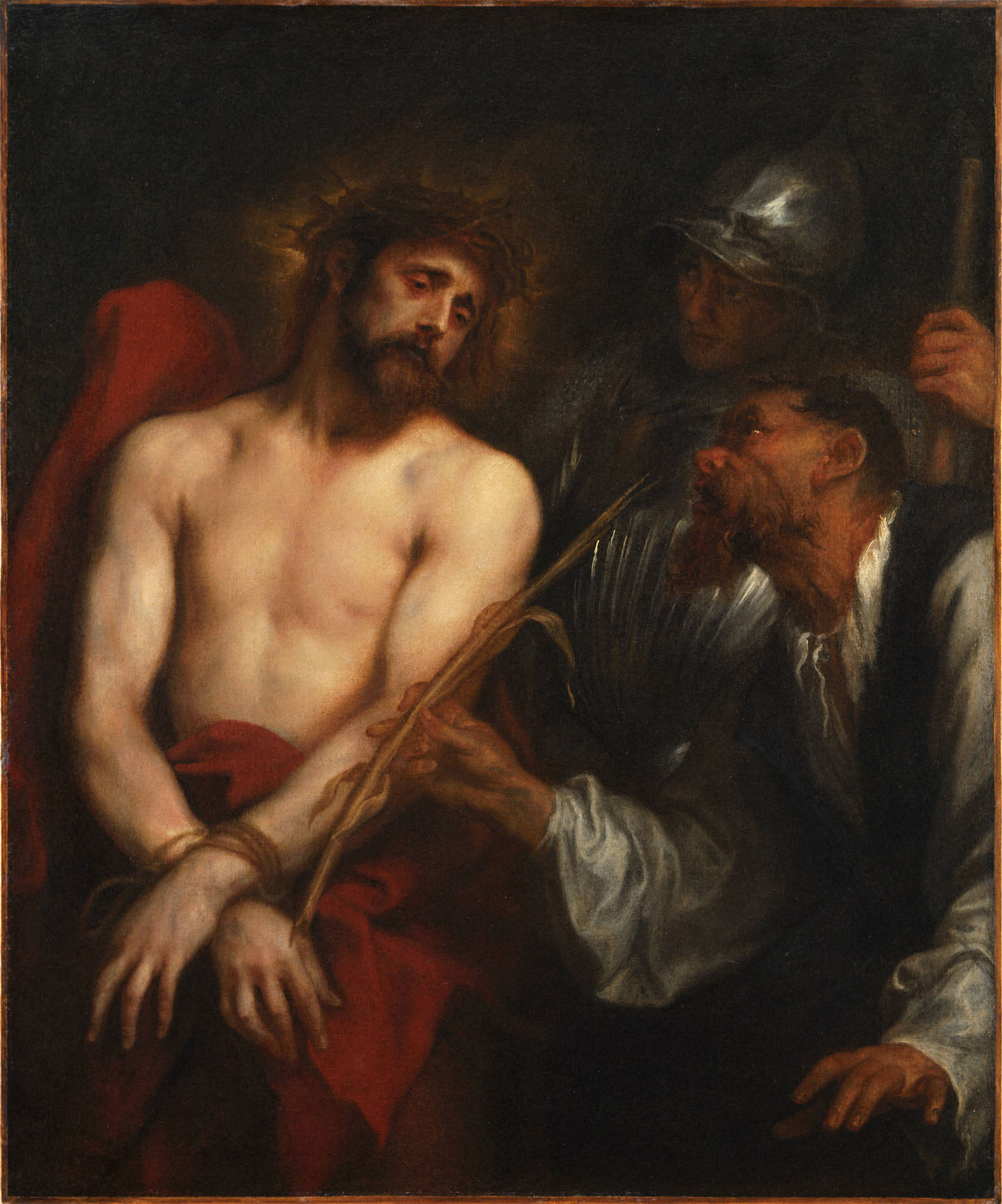
Anthony van Dyck, Christ Crowned with Thorns (c. 1628–1630), Princeton University Art Museum

== See also ==
- List of paintings by Édouard Manet
- 1865 in art

== Bibliography ==
- Cachin, Françoise; Moffett, Charles S.; Wilson-Bareau, Juliet (1983). Manet 1832-1883. Paris: Réunion des musées nationaux. ISBN 2-7118-0230-2.
- Adolphe Tabarant, Manet et ses œuvres, Paris, Gallimard, 1947, 600 p.
- Adolphe Tabarant, Les Manet de la collection Havemeyer : La Renaissance de l'art français, Paris, 1930, XIII éd.
- Moreau-Nélaton, Étienne (1926). Manet raconté par lui-même. Vol. 2, t. I. Paris: Henri Laurens. Document used for writing the article
- Moreau-Nélaton, Étienne (1926b). Manet raconté par lui-même. Vol. 2, t. II. Paris: Henri Laurens. Document used for writing the article
- Henri Loyrette et Gary Tinterow, Impressionnisme : Les origines, 1859-1869, 476 p. (ISBN 978-2711828203). Document used for writing the article
- Collectif RMN, Manet inventeur du moderne, Paris, 2011, 297 p. (ISBN 978-2-07-013323-9) Document used for writing the article
- Timothy James Clark, The Painting of Modern Life: Paris in the Art of Manet and His Followers, Princeton, Princeton University Press, 1999, 376 p. (ISBN 978-0691009032).
