= History of videotelephony =

The videophone as a concept began to materialize shortly after the telephone was patented in 1876, and its history is closely connected to that of the telephone. Many attempts were made to create a practical video-telephone, and were met with repeated commercial failure because of high cost, lack of popular demand and a failure to reach the threshold for the network effect to apply.

Videotelephony finally reached the mainstream in the 2000s with the subsumption of videotelephony into modern multifunction smartphones and videoconferencing apps which have made videotelephony ubiquitous at the same time as eliminating the videophone as a distinct product category.

== Early history ==
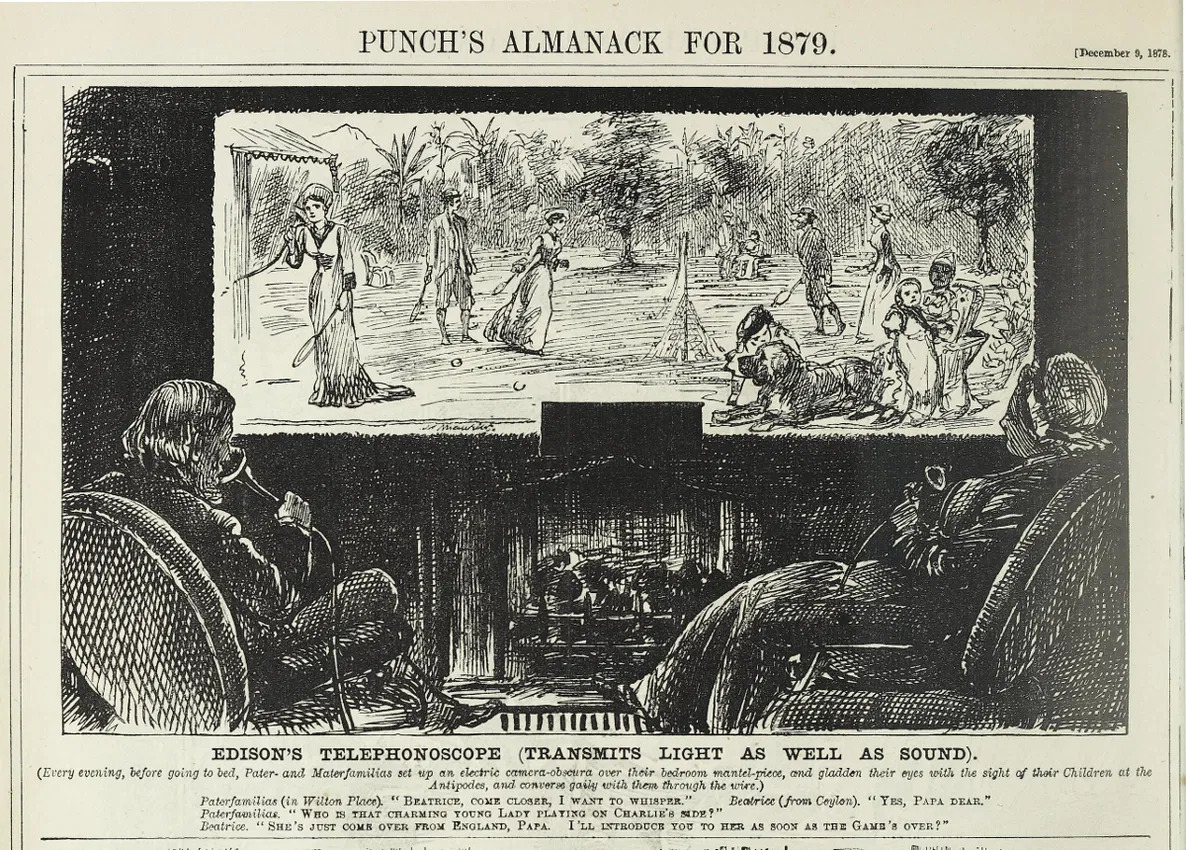
"Fiction becomes fact": Imaginary "Edison" combination videophone-television, conceptualized by George du Maurier and published in Punch magazine. The drawing also depicts then-contemporary speaking tubes, used by the parents in the foreground and their daughter on the viewing display (1878).

Barely two years after the telephone was first patented in the United States in 1876 by Alexander Graham Bell, an early concept of a combined videophone and wide-screen television called a telephonoscope was conceptualized in the popular periodicals of the day. It was also mentioned in various early science fiction works such as Le Vingtième siècle. La vie électrique (The 20th century. The electrical life) and other works written by Albert Robida, and was also sketched in various cartoons by George du Maurier as a fictional invention of Thomas Edison. One such sketch was published on December 9, 1878, in Punch magazine.

The term "telectroscope" was also used in 1878 by French writer and publisher Louis Figuier, to popularize an invention wrongly interpreted as real and incorrectly ascribed to Dr. Bell, possibly after his Volta Laboratory discreetly deposited a sealed container of a Graphophone phonograph at the Smithsonian Institution for safekeeping. Written under the pseudonym "Electrician", one article earlier claimed that "an eminent scientist" had invented a device whereby objects or people anywhere in the world "....could be seen anywhere by anybody". The device, among other functions, would allow merchants to transmit pictures of their wares to their customers, and the contents of museum collections to be made available to scholars in distant cities...." (Note: Although the pseudonymous letter was accompanied by a technical description of how the telectroscope would work and was published in a reputable New York newspaper, researchers later noted that it was published close to April Fools' Day and believed the article was submitted as an elaborate hoax.) In the era prior to the advent of broadcasting, electrical "seeing" devices were conceived as adjuncts to the telephone, thus creating the concept of a videophone.

Fraudulent reports of "amazing" advances in video telephones would be publicized as early as 1880 and would recur every few years, such as the episode of "Dr. Sylvestre" of Paris who claimed in 1902 to have invented a powerful (and inexpensive) video telephone, termed a "spectograph", the intellectual property rights he believed were worth $5,000,000. After reviewing his claim Dr. Bell denounced the supposed invention as a "fairy tale", and publicly commented on the charlatans promoting bogus inventions for financial gain or self-promotion.

However Dr. Alexander Graham Bell personally thought that videotelephony was achievable even though his contributions to its advancement were incidental. In April 1891, Dr. Bell actually did record conceptual notes on an "electrical radiophone", which discussed the possibility of "seeing by electricity" using devices that employed tellurium or selenium imaging components. Bell wrote, decades prior to the invention of the image dissector:

Should it be found ... [that the image sensor] is illuminated, then an apparatus might be constructed in which each piece of selenium is a mere speck, like the head of a small pin, the smaller the better. The darkened selenium should be placed in a cup-like receiver which can fit over the eye ... Then, when the first selenium speck is presented to an illuminated object, it may be possible that the eye in the darkened receiver, should perceive, not merely light, but an image of the object ...

Bell went on to later predict that: "...the day would come when the man at the telephone would be able to see the distant person to whom he was speaking." The discoveries in physics, chemistry and materials science underlying video technology would not be in place until the mid-1920s, first being utilized in electromechanical television. More practical "all-electronic" video and television would not emerge until 1939, but would then suffer several more years of delays before gaining popularity due to the onset and effects of World War II.

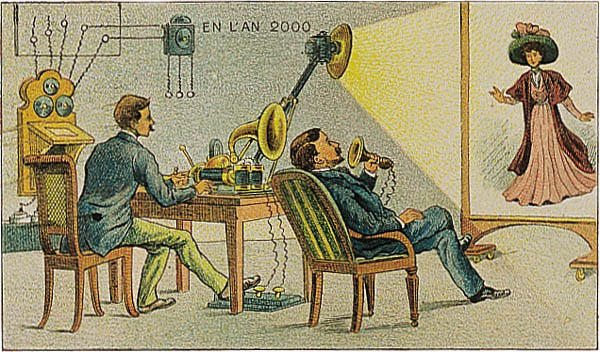
Artist's conception: 21st-century videotelephony imagined in the early 20th century (1910)

The compound term "videophone" slowly entered into general usage after 1950, although "video telephone" likely entered the lexicon earlier after video was coined in 1935. Prior to that time there appeared to be no standard terms for "video telephone", with expressions such as "sight-sound television system", "visual radio" and nearly 20 others (in English) being used to describe the marriage of telegraph, telephone, television and radio technologies employed in early experiments.

Among the technological precursors to the videophone were telegraphic image transmitters created by several companies, such as the wirephoto used by Western Union, and the teleostereograph developed by AT&T's Bell Labs, which were forerunners of today's fax (facsimile) machines. Such early image transmitters were themselves based on previous work by Ernest Hummel and others in the 19th century. By 1927 AT&T had created its earliest electromechanical television-videophone called the ikonophone (from Greek: "image-sound"), which operated at 18 frames per second and occupied half a room full of equipment cabinets. An early U.S. test in 1927 had their then-Commerce Secretary Herbert Hoover address an audience in New York City from Washington, D.C.; although the audio portion was two-way, the video portion was one-way with only those in New York being able to see Hoover.

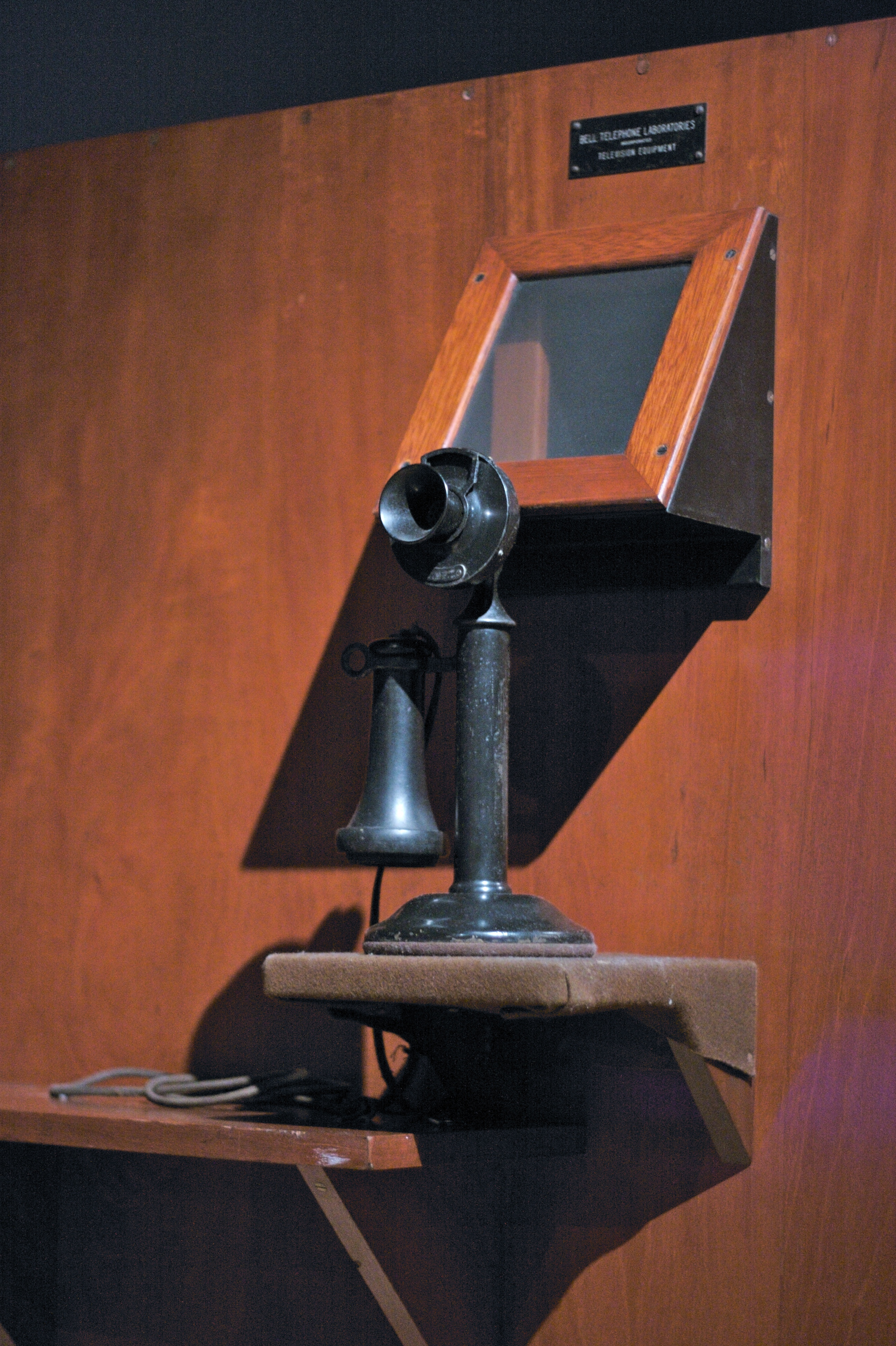
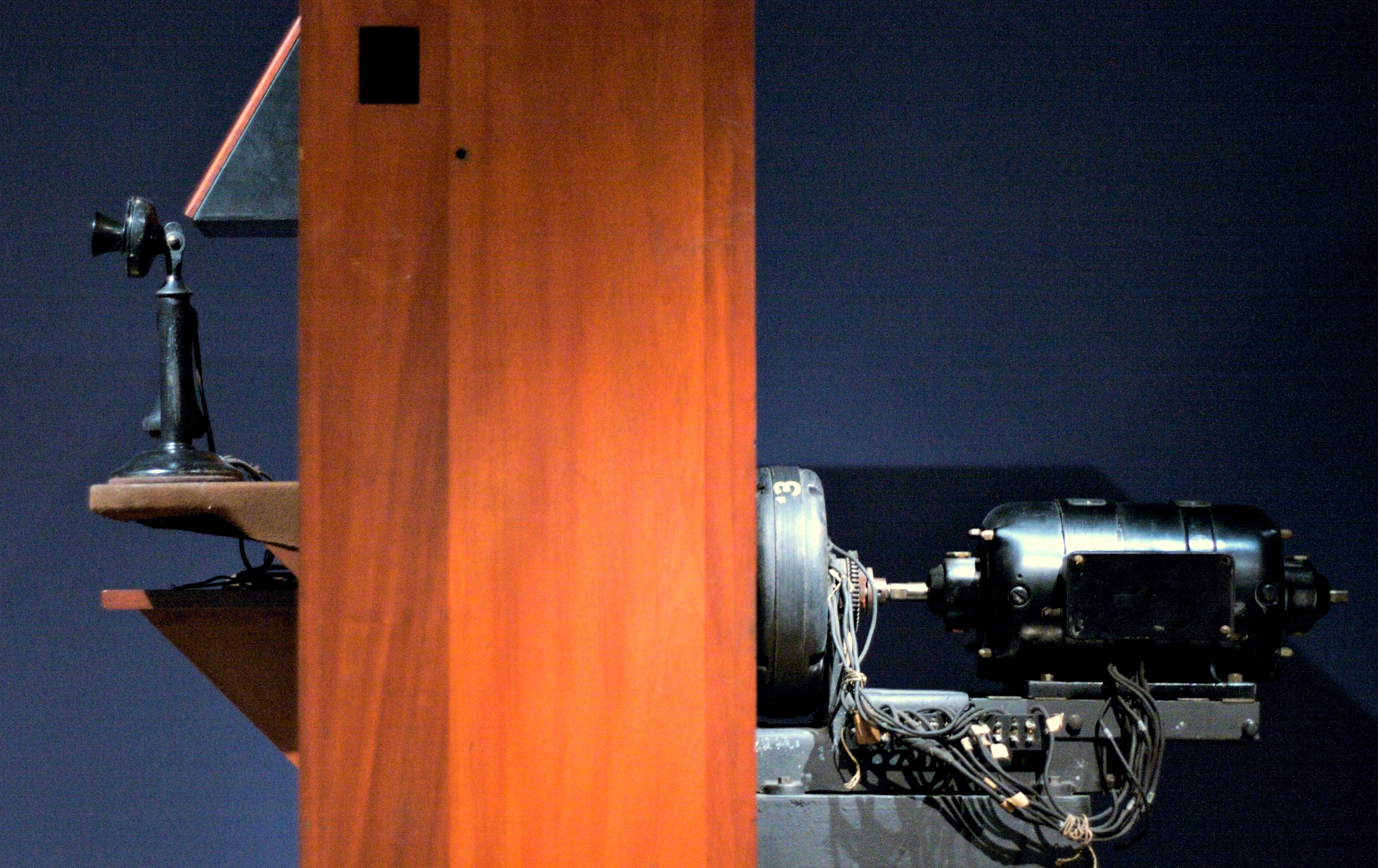
A 1927 Bell Labs videophone prototype (its Nipkow disk not visible), exhibited at the Museum of the Moving Image in New York

By 1930, AT&T's "two-way television-telephone" system was in full-scale experimental use. The Bell Labs' Manhattan facility devoted years of research to it during the 1930s, led by Dr. Herbert Ives along with his team of more than 200 scientists, engineers and technicians, intending to develop it for both telecommunication and broadcast entertainment purposes.

There were also other public demonstrations of "two-way television-telephone" systems during this period by inventors and entrepreneurs who sought to compete with AT&T, although none appeared capable of dealing with the technical issues of signal compression that Bell Labs would eventually resolve. Signal compression, and its later sibling data compression were fundamental to the issue of transmitting the very large bandwidth of low-resolution black and white video through the very limited capacity of low-speed copper PSTN telephone lines (higher resolution color videophones would require even far greater capabilities). (Note: One such demonstration that likely omitted any signal compression was performed in Mobile, Alabama, on April 27, 1938. An Alabama news article reported that a "...technician of the American Television Institute, [promoted a videophone from a display booth for] the Roche Home Equipment Company... and through the medium of a scientific marvel... flashed a living picture over an ordinary telephone wire. Forming a practical insight into things that are to come, the television contrivance afforded a small, but clear, picture of speakers at each end of the wire.") After the Second World War, Bell Labs resumed its efforts during the 1950s and 1960s, eventually leading to AT&T's Picturephone.

== Closed-circuit videophone systems: 1936–1940 ==
In early 1936, the first public video telephone service, Germany's Gegenseh-Fernsprechanlagen (visual telephone system), was developed by Dr. Georg Schubert, who headed the development department at the Fernseh-AG, a technical combine for television broadcasting technology. Two closed-circuit televisions were installed in the German Reichspost (post offices) in Berlin and Leipzig and connected together via a dedicated broadband coaxial cable to cover the distance of approximately 160 km (100 miles). The system's opening was inaugurated by the Minister of Posts Paul von Eltz-Rübenach in Berlin on March 1, 1936, who viewed and spoke with Leipzig's chief burgomaster.

Schubert's system was based on Gunter Krawinkel's earlier research of the late-1920s that he displayed at the 1929 Internationale Funkausstellung Berlin (Berlin International Radio Exposition). Schubet's higher-performance system employed a Nipkow disk flying-spot scanner for its transmitter (a form of mechanical television) and a 20 cm (8 inch) cathode-ray display tube with a resolution of 150 lines (180 lines in later versions) running at 25 frames per second.

After the transistor was invented at Bell Labs in 1948, an AT&T electrical engineer predicted:

... whenever a baby is born anywhere in the world, he is given at birth a ... telephone number for life [and] ... a watch-like device with ten little buttons on one side and a screen on the other ... when he wishes to talk with anyone in the world, he will pull out the device and [call] his friend. Then turning the device over, he will hear the voice of his friend and see his face on the screen, in color and in three dimensions. If he does not see and hear him he will know that the friend is dead.

— —Harold Osborne, 1948

After a period of experimentation, the system entered public use and was soon extended with another 160 km (100 miles) of coaxial cable from Berlin to Hamburg, and then in July 1938 from Leipzig to Nuremberg and Munich. Point-to-point video calling required swapping connections on a telephone switchboard. The system eventually operated with more than 1,000 km (620 miles) of coaxial cable transmission lines. The videophones were integrated within large public videophone booths, with two booths provided per city. Calls between Berlin and Leipzig cost RM3½, approximately one sixth of a British pound sterling, or about one-fifteenth of the average weekly wage.

The video telephone equipment used in Berlin was designed and built by the German Post Office Laboratory. Videophone equipment used in other German cities were developed by Fernseh A.G., partly owned by Baird Television Ltd. of the U.K., inventors of the world's first functional television. During its life the German system underwent further development and testing, resulting in higher resolutions and a conversion to an all-electronic camera tube transmission system to replace its mechanical Nipkow scanning disc. While the system's image quality was primitive by modern standards, it was deemed impressive in contemporary reports of the era, with users able to clearly discern the hands on wristwatches.

The videophones were offered to the general public, which had to visit special post office Fernsehsprechstellen (video telephone booths, from "far sight speech place") simultaneously in their respective cities, but which at the same time also had Nazi political and propagandistic overtones similar to the broadcasting of the 1936 Olympic Games in Berlin. The German post office announced ambitious plans to extend their public videophone network to Cologne, Frankfurt and Vienna, Austria, but expansion plans were discontinued in 1939 with the start of the Second World War. After Germany subsequently became fully engaged in the war its public videophone system was closed in 1940, with its expensive inter-city broadband cables converted to telegraphic message traffic and broadcast television service.

A similar commercial post office system was also created in France during the late-1930s. The Deutsche Bundespost postal service would decades later develop and deploy its BIGFON (Broadband Integrated Glass-Fiber Optical Network) videotelephony network from 1981 to 1988, serving several large German cities, and also created one of Europe's first public switched broadband services in 1989.

== Videophone over PSTN research and proof of concept: 1930–1968 ==
In the United States, AT&T's Bell Labs conducted extensive research and development of videophones, eventually leading to public demonstrations of its trademarked "Picturephone" product in the 1960s. Its large Manhattan experimental laboratory devoted years of technical research during the 1930s, led by Dr. Herbert Ives along with his team of more than 200 scientists, engineers and technicians. The Bell Labs early experimental model of 1930 had transmitted uncompressed video through multiple phone lines, a highly impractical and expensive method unsuitable for commercial use.

During the mid-1950s, its laboratory work had produced another early test prototype capable of transmitting still images every two seconds over regular analog PSTN telephone lines. The images were captured by the Picturephone's compact Vidicon camera and then transferred to a storage tube or magnetic drum for transmission over regular phone lines at two-second intervals to the receiving unit, which displayed them on a small cathode-ray television tube. AT&T had earlier promoted its experimental video for telephone service at the 1939 New York World's Fair.

=== AT&T Picturephone Mod I ===
The more advanced Picturephone "Mod I" (Model No. 1) had public evaluation displays at Disneyland and the 1964 New York World's Fair, with the first transcontinental videocall between the two venues made on April 20, 1964. These demonstration units used small oval housings on swivel stands, intended to stand on desks. Similar AT&T Picturephone units were also featured at the Telephone Pavilion (also called the "Bell Telephone Pavilion") at Expo 67, an International World's Fair held in Montreal, Canada in 1967. Demonstration units were available at the fairs for the public to test, with fairgoers permitted to make videophone calls to volunteer recipients at other locations.

The United States would not see its first public videophone booths until 1964, when AT&T installed their earliest commercial videophone units, the Picturephone "Mod I", in booths that were set up in the lobbies of New York's Grand Central Terminal, the National Geographic Society Headquarters in Washington D.C., and Chicago's Prudential Building. The system was the result of decades of research and development at Bell Labs, its principal supplier, Western Electric, plus other researchers working under contract to the Bell Labs. However the use of reservation time slots and their cost of US$16 (Washington, D.C., to New York, $166 in 2025) to $27 (New York to Chicago, $280 in 2025) for a three-minute call at the public videophone booths greatly limited their appeal resulting in their closure by 1968.

== First privately available videophone service: 1970s ==
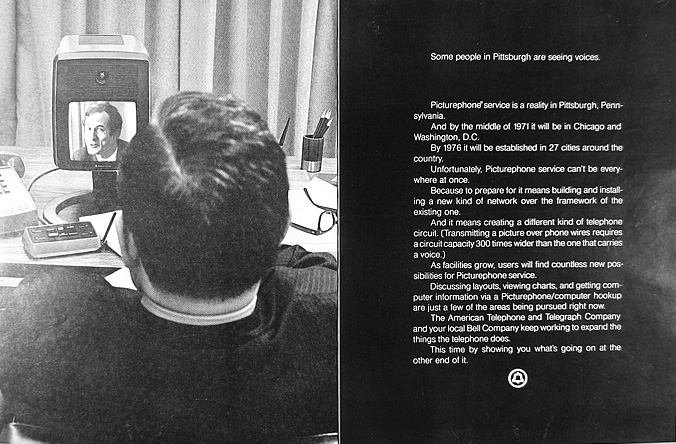
AT&T magazine advertisement announcing commercial launch of Picturephone service.

AT&T developed a refined Picturephone throughout the late 1960s, resulting in the "Mod II" (Model No. 2), which served as the basis for AT&T's launch of the first true video conferencing service. Unlike earlier systems, in which people had to visit public videophone booths, any company or individual could pay to be connected to the system, after which they could call anyone in the network from their home or office.

The inaugural video call occurred on June 30, 1970, between Pittsburgh Mayor Peter Flaherty and Chairman and CEO John Harper of Alcoa. The service officially launched the next day, July 1, 1970, with 38 Picturephones located at eight Pittsburgh companies. Among the first subscribers, Westinghouse Electric Corporation became Bell's largest Picturephone customer, leasing 12 sets. The following year, Picturephone service expanded to central Chicago and the suburb of Oak Brook, before expanding to other large East Coast cities.

=== Picturephone Mod II ===
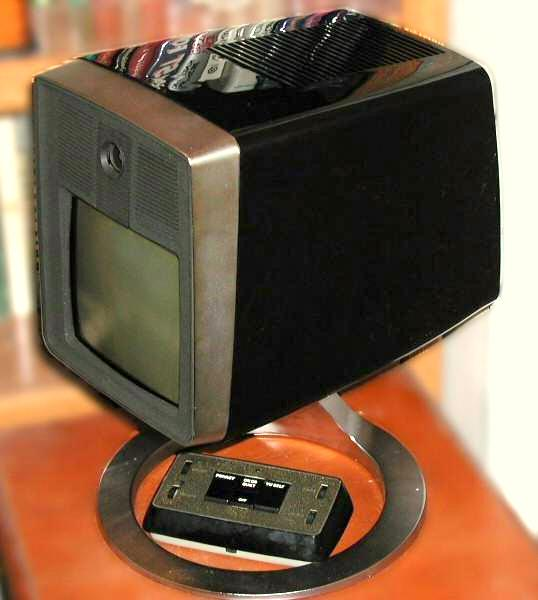
AT&T Picturephone (Mod II) fully enclosed in its housing, control pad at bottom

The Picturephone's video bandwidth was 1 MHz with a vertical scan rate of 30 Hz, horizontal scan rate of 8 kHz, and about 250 visible scan lines. The equipment included a speakerphone (hands free telephone), with an added box to control picture transmission. Each Picturephone line used three twisted pairs of ordinary telephone cable, two pairs for video and one for audio and signaling. Cable amplifiers were spaced about a mile apart (1.6 kilometres) with built-in six-band adjustable equalization filters. For distances of more than a few miles, the signal was digitized at 2 MHz and 3 bits per sample DPCM, and transmitted on a T-2 carrier.

The Picturephone Mod II used a Plumbicon camera and a small cathode-ray tube display. The camera was located above the screens to help users see eye to eye. Later generation display screens were larger than in the original demonstration units, approximately six inches (15 cm) square in a roughly cubical cabinet.

The original Picturephone system used contemporary crossbar and multi-frequency operation. Lines and trunks were six wire, one pair each way for video and one pair two way for audio. MF address signaling on the audio pair was supplemented by a Video Supervisory Signal (VSS) looping around on the video quad to ensure continuity. More complex protocols were later adopted for conferencing.

To deploy Picturephone service, new wideband crossbar switches were designed and installed into the Bell System's 5XB switch offices, this being the most widespread of the relatively modern kind. Hundreds of technicians attended schools to learn to operate the Cable Equalizer Test Set and other equipment, and to install Picturephones.

=== Service pricing ===
In addition to an installation charge of $150 for the first set, companies paid $160 per month (equivalent to $1,326 in 2025) for the service on the first set and $50 per month for each additional set. Thirty minutes of video calling was included with each Picturephone, with extra minutes costing 25 cents (Note: Several uses of the Picturephone were novel and ahead of their time. At Alcoa in Pittsburgh, their Picturephone system was integrated into the company's corporate Information Technology system under its APRIS, or Alcoa Picturephone Remote Information System. APRIS let users retrieve information from Alcoa's databases, controlled by the buttons on their touch-tone telephones, with the data being presented on their Picturephone's video display, long before computer monitors came into popular use. AT&T's Bell Labs would also soon experiment with multiple users on the same videocall, creating one of the earliest forms of videoconferencing.). AT&T later reduced the price to $75 per month with forty-five minutes of video calling included to stimulate demand.

=== Commercial failure ===
AT&T's initial Picturephone "Mod I" (Model No. 1) and then its upgraded "Mod II" programs, were a continuation of its many years of prior research during the 1920s, 1930s, late 1940s and 1950s. Both Picturephone programs, like their experimental AT&T predecessors, were researched principally at its Bell Labs, formally spanned some 15 years and consumed more than US$500 million, (Note: The $500M figure is attributed only to the AT&T and Bell Labs' 15 year program covering its Picturephone Mod I and Mod II versions. Earlier videotelephony programs during the later half of the 1920s, 1930s, late 1940s and 1950s, plus the AT&T VideoPhone 2500 model program of the late 1980s led to a cumulative cost which approached, by some estimates, one billion dollars in total for all videotelephony development.) eventually meeting with commercial failure. At the time of its first launch, AT&T foresaw a hundred thousand Picturephones in use across the Bell System by 1975. However, by the end of July 1974, only five Picturephones were being leased in Pittsburgh, and U.S.-wide there were only a few hundred, mostly in Chicago. Unrelated difficulties at New York Telephone also slowed AT&T's efforts, and few customers signed up for the service in either city. Customers peaked at 453 in early 1973. AT&T ultimately concluded that its early Picturephones were a "concept looking for a market".

== Other early videophones: 1968–1984 ==
Beginning in the late 1960s, several countries worldwide sought to compete with AT&T's advanced development of its Picturephone service in the United States. However such projects were research and capital intensive, and fraught with difficulties in being deployed commercially.

=== France ===
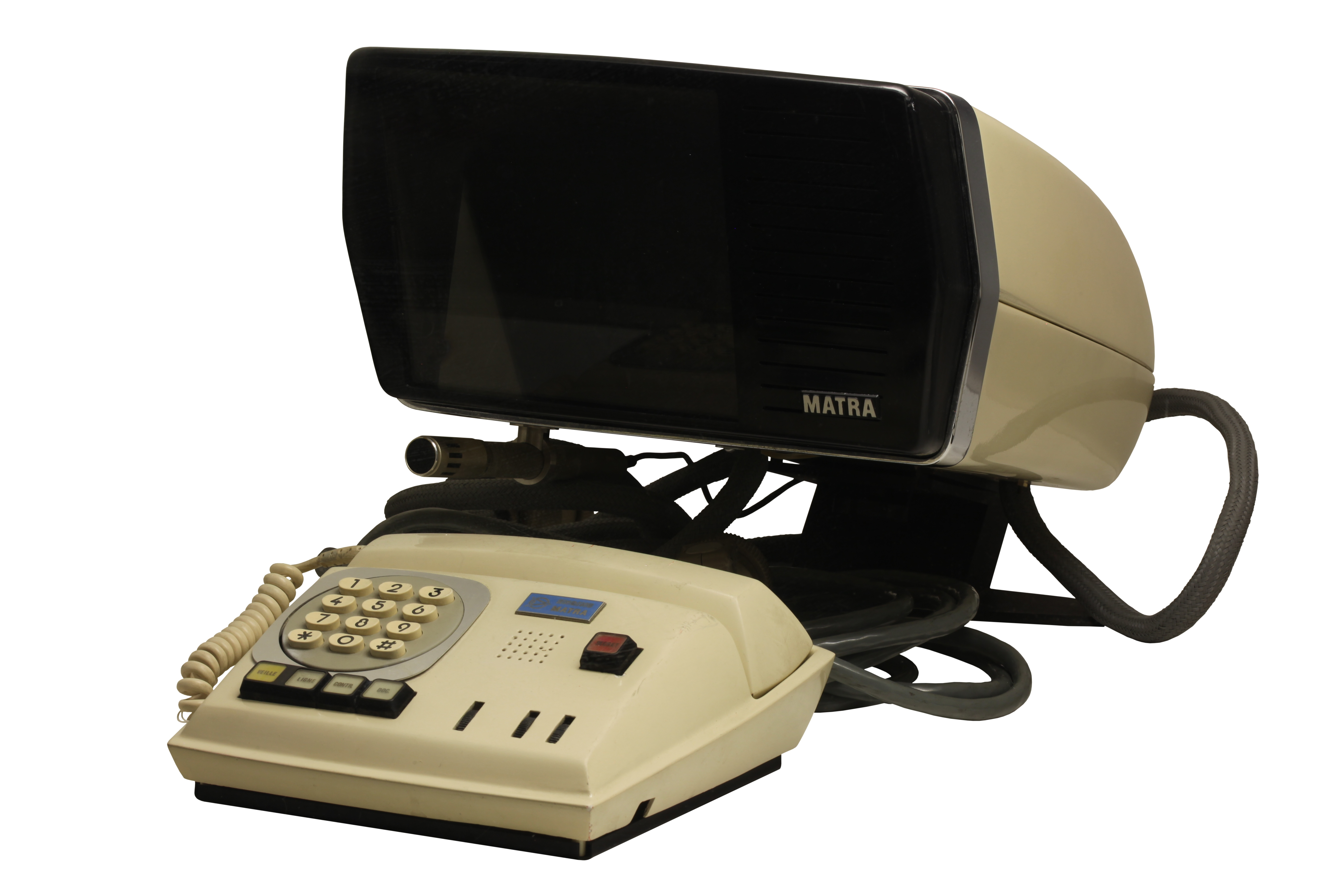
The French Matra videophone (1970)

France's post office telecommunications branch had earlier set up a commercial videophone system similar to the German Reichspost public videophone system of the late 1930s. In 1972 the defense and electronics manufacturer Matra was one of three French companies that sought to develop advanced videophones in the early 1970s, spurred by AT&T's Picturephone in the United States. Initial plans by Matra included the deployment of 25 units to France's Centre national d'études des télécommunications (CNET of France Télécom) for their internal use. CNET intended to guide its initial use towards the business sector, to be later followed by personal home usage. Its estimated unit cost in 1971 was the equivalent of £325, with a monthly usage subscription charge of £3.35.

Studies of applications of videotelephony were conducted by CNET in France in 1972, with its first commercial applications for videophones appearing in 1984. The delay was due to the problem of insufficient bandwidth, with 2 Mb per second being required for transmitting both video and audio signals. The problem was solved worldwide by the creation of software for data encoding and compression via video coding and decoding algorithms, also known as codecs.

=== Sweden ===
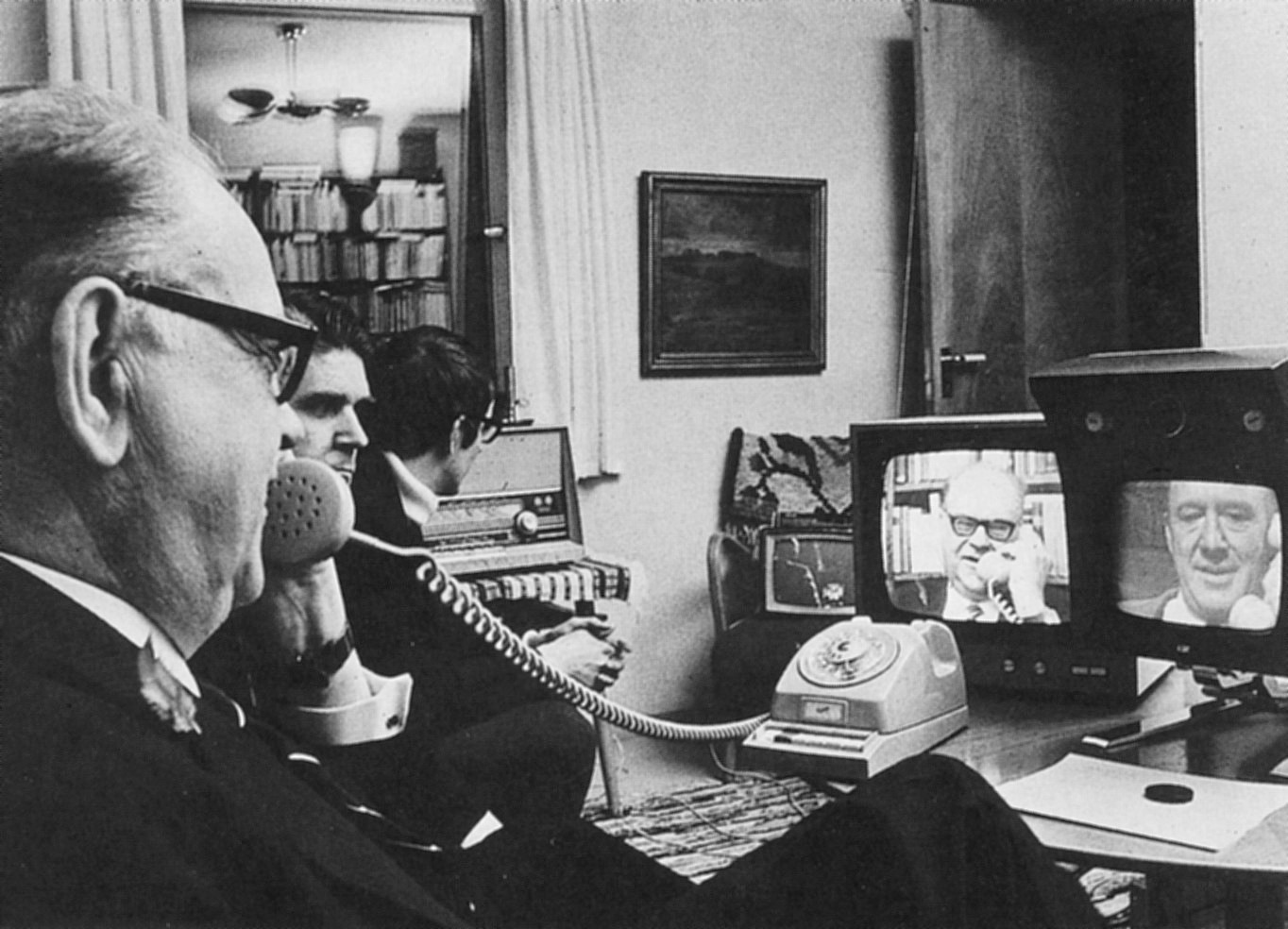
Swedish Prime Minister Tage Erlander using an Ericsson videophone to speak with Lennart Hyland, a popular TV show host (1969)

In Sweden, electronics maker Ericsson began developing a videophone in the mid-1960s, intending to market it to government, institutions, businesses and industry, but not to consumers due to AT&T's lack of success in that market segment. Tests were conducted in Stockholm, including trial communications in banking. Ultimately Ericsson chose not to proceed with further production.

An experimental Philips videophone demonstration, Netherlands (1974 video, 1:23) (in Dutch)

=== United Kingdom ===
In 1970 the British General Post Office had 16 demonstration models of its Viewphone built, meant to be the equivalent to AT&T's Picturephone. Their initial attempt at a first generation commercial videophone later led to the British Telecom Relate 2000, which was released for sale in 1993, costing between £400-£500 each. The Relate 2000 featured a 74 millimetres (2.9 in) flip-up color LCD screen operating at a nominal rate of 8 video frames per second, which could be depressed to 3-4 frames per second if the PSTN bandwidth was limited. In the era prior to low-cost, high-speed broadband service, its video quality was found to be generally poor by the public with images shifting jerkily between frames, due to British phone lines that generally provided less than 3.4 kHz of bandwidth. British Telecom had initially expected the device, manufactured by Marconi Electronics, to sell at a rate of 10,000 per year, but its actual sales were minimal. Its second generation videophone thus also proved to be commercially unsuccessful, similar to AT&T's VideoPhone 2500 of the same time period.

== Digital videotelephony: 1985–1999 ==
This time period saw the research, development and commercial roll-out of what would become powerful video compression and decompression software codecs, which would eventually lead to low cost videotelephony in the early 2000s.

=== Video compression ===
Advances in video compression allowed digital video streams to be transmitted over the Internet, which was previously difficult due to the impractically high bandwidth requirements of uncompressed video. To achieve Video Graphics Array (VGA) quality video (480p resolution and 256 colors) with raw uncompressed video, it would require a bandwidth of over 92 Mbps. A common compression technique used to significantly reduce bandwidth requirements in videotelephony and videoconferencing is the discrete cosine transform (DCT), developed by Nasir Ahmed, T. Natarajan and K. R. Rao in 1973. The DCT algorithm was the basis for the first practical video coding standard that was useful for online videoconferencing, H.261, standardised by the ITU-T in 1988, and subsequent H.26x video coding standards.

=== AT&T post-Picturephone ===
Many parallel efforts to bring videotelephony to the desktop continued at AT&T Bell Laboratories after Picturephone. Ultimately, AT&T introduced five product lines in the early 1990s: VideoPhone 2500, Vistium, the AVP processor, a Multipoint Control Unit, and the WorldWorx service. AT&T partnered with Compression Labs International (CLI) to develop the technology for the VideoPhone 2500 which was a low-bit-rate device designed to run over ordinary POTS phone lines. Vistium was AT&T's desktop videoconferencing system designed to work over ISDN or Switched 56. AT&T discontinued Vistium in late 1995. Multipoint control units provided the capability to link three or more desktop videoconferencing users.

The WorldWorx service, announced in mid-1994, was AT&T's video network service offering. By July, 1995, WorldWorx announced the world's first service to make real-time voice, video and data communications possible for multiple participants on one call. The business unit was led by Ernest G. DeNigris, a former member of the AT&T Picturephone team.

AT&T would market its VideoPhone 2500 to the general public from 1992 to 1995 with purchase prices starting at US$1,500 (~$3400 in 2025) and later dropping to $1,000 (~$2200 in 2025), marketed by its Global VideoPhone Systems unit. The VideoPhone 2500 was designed to provide low-frame rate compressed color video on ordinary Plain Old Telephone Service (POTS) lines, circumventing the significantly higher cost ADSL telephone service lines used by several other videoconferencing manufacturers. It was limited by analog phone line connection speeds of about 19 Kilobits per second, the video portion being 11,200 bit/s, and with a maximum frame rate of 10 frames per second, but typically much slower, as low as a third of a video frame per second. The VideoPhone 2500 used proprietary technology protocols, including AT&T's Global VideoPhone Standard (GVS). Again, AT&T met with very little commercial success, selling only about 30,000 units, mainly outside the United States.

Despite AT&T's various videophone products meeting with commercial failure, they were widely viewed as technical successes which expanded the limits of the telecommunications sciences in several areas. Its videotelephony programs were critically acclaimed for their technical brilliance and even the novel uses they experimented with. The research and development programs conducted by Bell Labs were highly notable for their beyond-the-state-of-the-art results produced in materials science, advanced telecommunications, microelectronics and information technologies.

AT&T's published research additionally helped pave the way for other companies to later enter the field of videoconferencing. The company's videophones also generated significant media coverage in science journals, the general news media and in popular culture. The image of a futuristic AT&T videophone being casually used in the science fiction film 2001: A Space Odyssey, became iconic of both the movie and, arguably, the public's general view of the future.

=== Intel and ProShare ===
In May 1992, Intel formally began a videoconferencing project. One team focused on data conferencing, another on PC telephony and another on adding videoconferencing to PC telephony. Intel combined these teams into what became the Personal Conferencing Division headed by Patrick W. Gelsinger who would one day lead the company. There was considerable debate within Intel whether to emphasize videoconferencing or audio/data conferencing in that many business users were not interested in seeing each other through video. Ultimately, Intel decided to push video along with audio and data conferencing, because video would more significantly increase demand for future generations of Intel processors. In early 1994, Intel began shipping ProShare, a personal videoconferencing product that ran over ISDN and allowed up to twenty-four people to simultaneously participate. In mid-1996, Intel introduced the Intel Video Phone with ProShare technology running over POTS and required a 133-MHz Pentium processor-based PC and specialized modem.

Intel also introduced its Internet Video Phone in 1996 which supported the H.323 international standard for real-time voice, video and data communication over packet-based networks. One team focused on data conferencing, another on PC telephony and another on adding videoconferencing to PC telephony. Intel combined these teams into what became the Personal Conferencing Division headed by Patrick W. Gelsinger who would one day lead the company. There was considerable debate within Intel whether to emphasize videoconferencing or audio/data conferencing in that many business users were not interested in seeing each other through video.

=== Japanese videophones ===
In Japan the Lumaphone was developed and marketed by Mitsubishi in 1985. The project was originally started by the Ataritel division of the Atari Video Game Company in 1983 under the direction of Atari's Steve Bristow. Atari then sold its division to Mitsubishi Electric in 1984. The Lumaphone was marketed by Mitsubishi Electric of America in 1986 as the Luma LU-1000, costing US$1,500, designed with a small black and white video display, approximately 4 centimetres (1.6 in) in size, and a video camera adjacent to the display which could be blocked with a sliding door for privacy. Although promoted as a "videophone", it operated similar to Bell Labs' early experimental image transfer phone of 1956, transmitting still images every 3–5 seconds over analog POTS lines. It could also be hooked up to a printer or connected to a regular TV or monitor for improved teleconferencing.

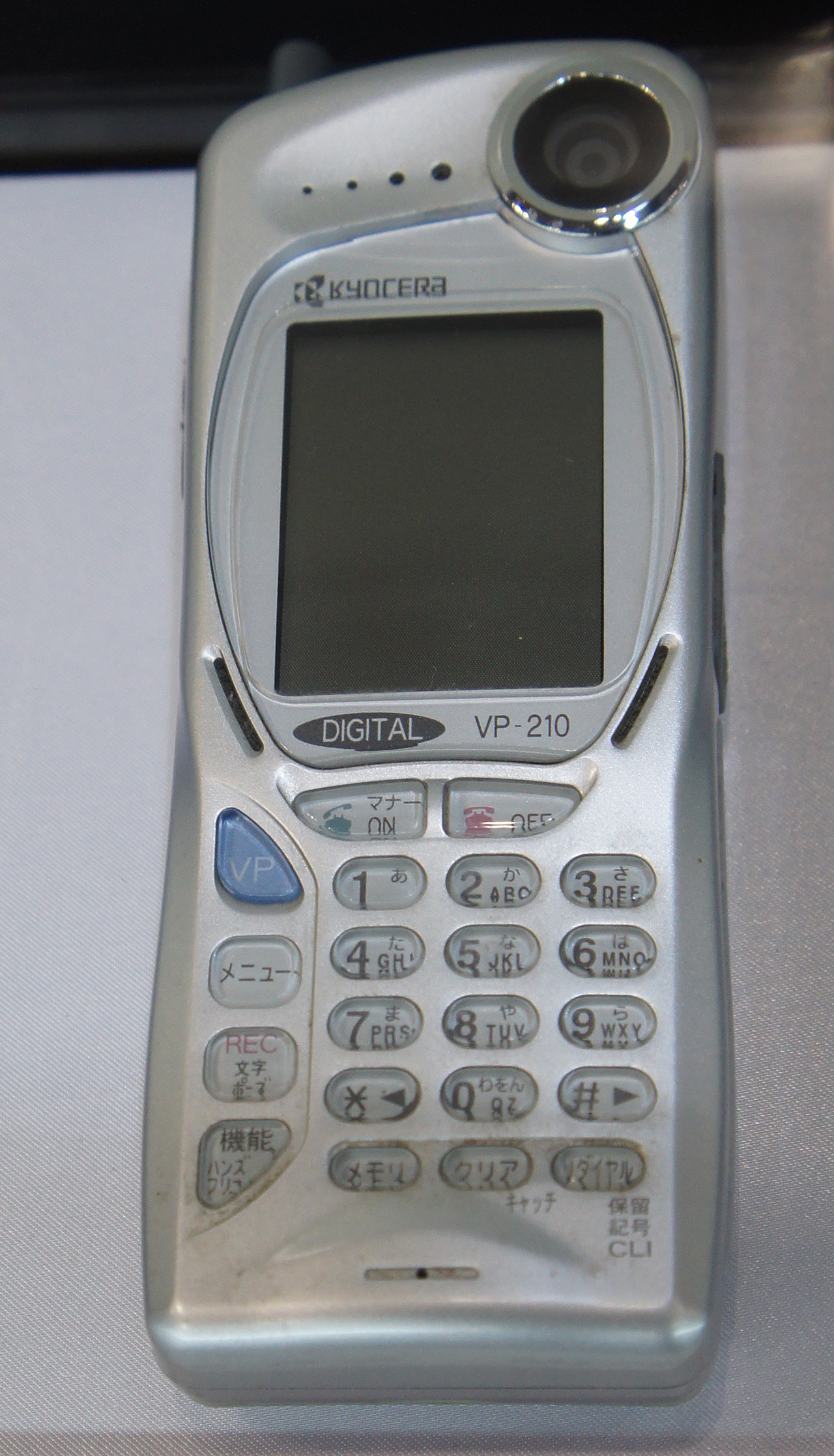
The Kyocera VP-210 Visual Phone was the first commercial mobile videophone. The Personal Handy-phone System (PHS) phone was introduced in Japan (1999).

Mitsubishi also marketed its lower-cost VisiTel LU-500 image phone in 1988 costing about US$400, aimed at the consumer market. It came with reduced capabilities but had with a larger black and white display. Other Japanese electronic manufacturers marketed similar image transfer phones during the late-1980s, including Sony's PCT-15 (US$500), and two models from Panasonic, its WG-R2 (US$450) and its KX-TV10 (US$500).

Much later the Kyocera Corporation, an electronics manufacturer based in Kyoto, conducted a two-year development campaign from 1997 to 1999 that resulted in the release of the VP-210 VisualPhone, the world's first mobile color videophone that also doubled as a camera phone for still photos. The camera phone was the same size as similar contemporary mobile phones, but sported a large camera lens and a 5 cm (2 inch) color TFT display capable of displaying 65,000 colors, and was able to process two video frames per second. The 155 gram (5.5 oz.) camera could also take 20 photos and convey them by e-mail, with the camera phone retailing at the time for 40,000 yen, about US$325 in 1999.

The VP-210 was released in May 1999 and used its single front-facing 110,000-pixel camera to send two images per second through Japan's PHS mobile phone network system. Although its frame rate was crude and its memory is considered tiny in the present day, the phone was viewed as "revolutionary" at the time of its release.

The Kyocera project was initiated at their Yokohama research and development center by Kazumi Saburi, one of their section managers. His explanation for the project was "Around that time, cellular handsets with enabled voice and SMS communication capabilities were considered to be just one among many personal communication tools. One day a simple idea hit us - 'What if we were able to enjoy talking with the intended person watching his/her face on the display?' We were certain that such a device would make cell phone communications much more convenient and enjoyable."

Saburi also stated that their R&D section had "nourished [the idea] for several years before" they received project approval from their top management which had encourage such forward-thinking research, because they "also believed that such a product would improve Kyocera's brand image." Their research showed that a "cell phone with a camera and color display provided a completely new value for users, It could be used as a phone, a camera and a photo album".

Technical challenges handled by about a dozen engineers at Kyocera over the two year development period included the camera module's placement within the phone at a time when electronic components had not been fully reduced in size, as well as increasing its data transmission rate. After its release the mobile video-camera phone was commercially successful, spawning several other competitors such as the DDI Pocket, and one from Vodafone K.K.

== Videoconferencing and videophone improvements: post-2000 ==
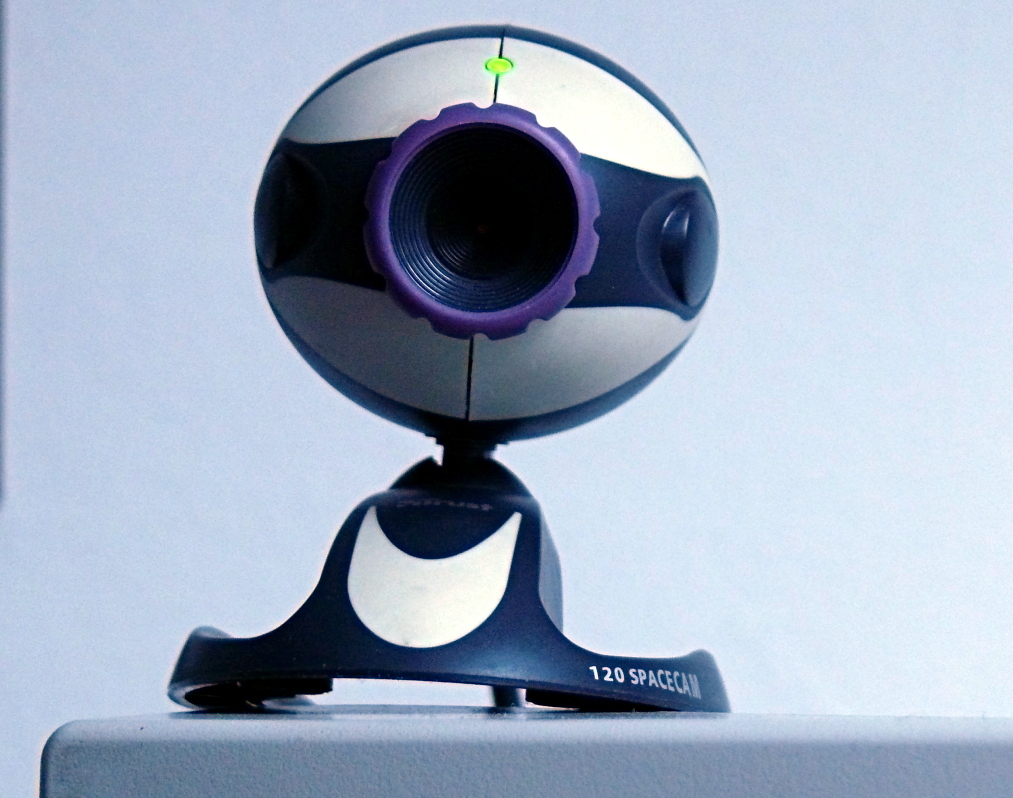
Typical low-cost webcam used with many personal computers

Significant improvements in video call quality of service for the deaf occurred in the United States in 2003 when Sorenson Media Inc. (formerly Sorenson Vision), a video compression software coding company, developed its VP-100 model stand-alone videophone specifically for the deaf community. It was designed to output its video to the user's television in order to lower the cost of acquisition, and to offer remote control and a powerful video compression codec for unequaled video quality and ease of use with a video relay service (VRS). Favorable reviews quickly led to its popular usage at educational facilities for the deaf, and from there to the greater deaf community.

Coupled with similar high-quality videophones introduced by other electronics manufacturers, the availability of high speed Internet, and sponsored video relay services authorized by the U.S. Federal Communications Commission in 2002, VRS services for the deaf underwent rapid growth in that country.

In May of 2002, Boeing announced the first public demonstration of "true broadband" videoconferencing between an airplane and the ground. The videoconference linked Boeing 737 business jet passengers flying 37,000 feet above Arizona with participants at Boeing's annual investors' conference in St. Louis. The demonstration via satellite ran at a speed of 256 kilobits per second.

== Ubiquitous videoconferencing and the end of the videophone ==
The videophone as a distinct product concept ceased to exist in the late 2000s as the convergence of multiple factors made video calling functionality ubiquitous across a wide range of computing devices.

The widespread availability of Internet access, the exponential increase in processing power of modern CPUs, increasingly efficient video codecs, and the introduction of cheap webcams and large-screen Internet-connected video-capable cameraphones such as the iPhone in 2007 led to a virtuous spiral which allowed the integration of video calling as a universal feature of modern mobile phones, laptop and desktop computers. Rather than requiring a distinct device, videoconferencing, and by extension videotelephony, became an application software feature with the introduction of video calling services such a Google Meet, Zoom and Microsoft Teams.

== See also ==
- History of mobile phones
- History of radio
- History of telecommunication
- History of the telephone
- History of television
- List of video telecommunication services and product brands
- Telepresence
- History of communication
- Timeline of the telephone
- Videotelephony
- Webcam

== Bibliography ==
- Burns, R.W., Television: An International History of the Formative Years IEE Publication Series, Institution of Electrical Engineers, Science Museum (Great Britain), 1998, ISBN 0-85296-914-7, ISBN 978-0-85296-914-4
- Mulbach, Lothar; Bocker, Martin; Prussog, Angela. "Telepresence in Videocommunications: A Study on Stereoscopy and Individual Eye Contact", Human Factors, June 1995, Vol.37, No.2, p. 290, ISSN 0018-7208, Gale Document Number: GALE|A18253819. Accessed December 23, 2011, via General Science eCollection (subscription). This study in turn cites:

- Norby, K. "A Window To The Future: The Videophone Experience In Norway", Kjeller, Norway: Norwegian Telecom Research Department, 1991, pp. 66-77.
