= Telephonoscope =

19th-century early concept of videophone and television

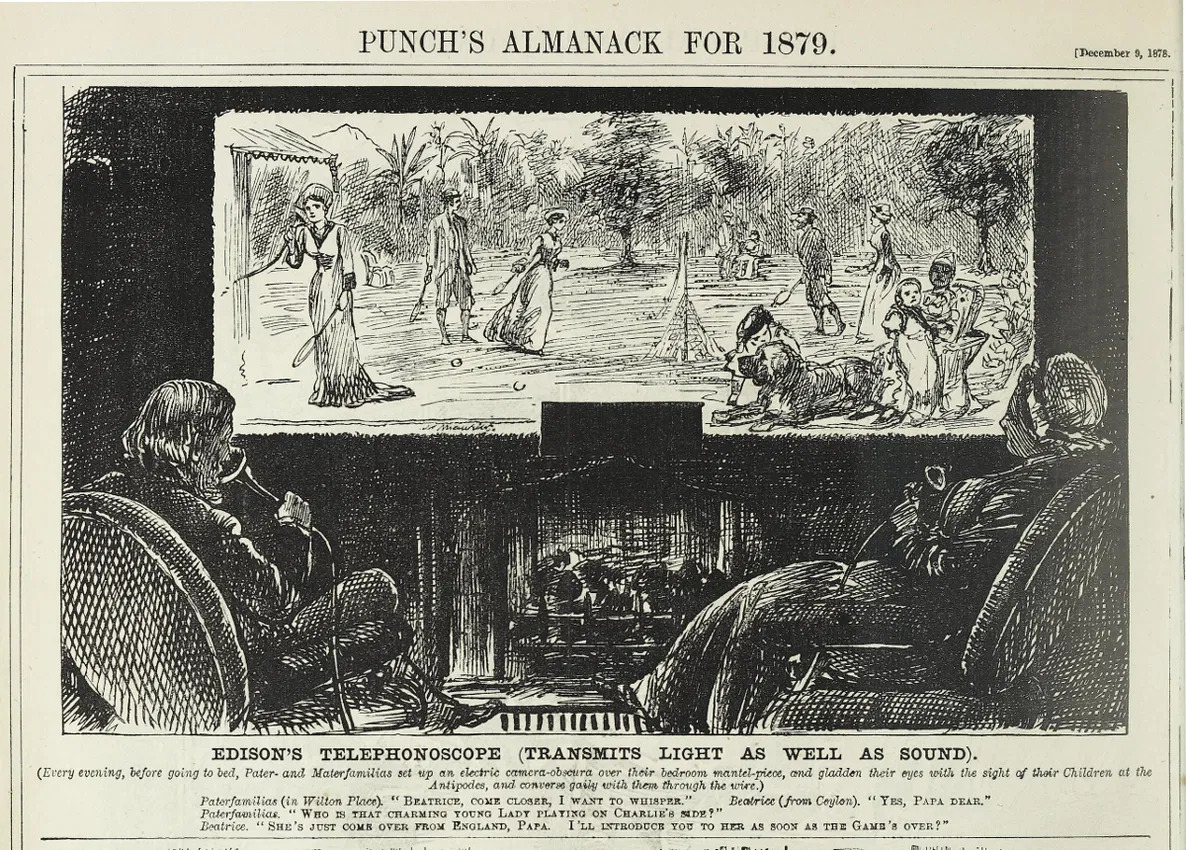
Early videophone-television concept by George du Maurier

A telephonoscope was an early concept of videophone and television, conceptualized in the late 1870s through the 1890s. It was mentioned in various early science fiction works such as Le Vingtième siècle. La vie électrique (The Twentieth Century: The Electrical Life) and other works written by Albert Robida. It was also sketched in various cartoons by George du Maurier as a fictional invention by Thomas Edison including one made on December 9, 1878 in Punch magazine.

Robida also forecast the era of television broadcasts, with concept art drawn of a televised opera performance, and of a live battlefield report.

== See also ==
- Telectroscope
- History of videotelephony
