= Draner =

Belgian caricaturist and illustrator

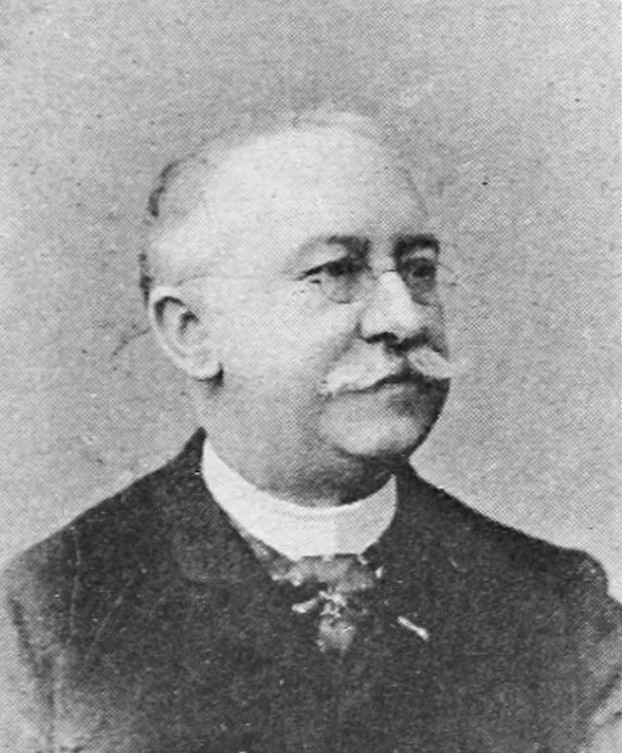
- Born: Jules Joseph Georges Renard; 12 November 1833; Liège, Belgium
- Died: 30 August 1926 (aged 92); Paris, France
- Known for: Caricature, illustration
- Notable work: Au Bureau de l'Eclipse - Paris, c. 1870.
- Movement: Modernism

Draner, actually Jules Joseph Georges Renard (12 November 1833 in Liège – 1926 in Paris), was a Belgian painter, Illustrator and cartoonist. Draner, who began working as an illustrator for renowned newspapers in 1861 and resided in Paris, created late costumes for a variety of renowned theaters and opera houses. He is also considered to be an early Belgian comics artist.

== Biography ==
=== Life ===
Jules Renard was born in 1833 in Liège, the son of a printer and bookseller who printed in 1850 the Almanac of Mathieu Lansberg. Later he formed his name "Draner" as an anagram of his surname Renard, a name that he used all his life in all his drawings, although he was also known as "Paf". After leaving school, he worked as secretary in the administration of the Société des Mines et de Zinc de la Vieille Fonderies-Montagne, an enterprise of the zinc industry in his home town. As an autodidact, he began drawing and creating his first caricatures on motives that he found in the everyday life of Liège and soon began working with local newspapers. Between 1852 and 1861, he worked for the Brussels paper Uylenspiegel, founded by Félicien Rops.

In 1861, he moved to Paris, where the Société des Mines et de Zinc de la Vieille Fonderies-Montagne had a branch. In the beginning of his Parisian years, he primarily caricatured military life in his drawings; between 1861 and 1864, he had already produced 136 colored lithographs on this topic, portraying himself as a military of different nationality in an ironic way. He published these images in albums such as Types militaires de toutes les nations, Nouvelle vie militaire, and Le colonel Ramollot. From 1866, he worked as an illustrator for the satirical magazine Le Charivari, where, in 1879, he succeeded Amédée de Noé, known as "Cham" (1818-1879), as a regular illustrator. In addition, his amusing drawings appeared in magazines such as La Caricature, L'Eclipse, Le Monde Classique, Paris-Comique, L'Illustration, Le Monde Illustré, Le journal amusant and Petit Journal.

From 1864 to 1893, Draner also designed costumes for theater and opera houses. His imaginative stage costumes were designed for performances at La Scala in Milan, the Theatre Royal, Drury Lane in London, the Théâtre des Galeries Saint-Hubert in Brussels, the Metropolitan Opera in New York City, as well as the Parisian stages of the Théâtre du Châtelet, Théâtre de la Renaissance, Éden-Theatre or the Folies Bergère and including most of the works of Jacques Offenbach. Draner died in Paris in 1926, at the age of 93, and his drawings estate was then donated to the University of Liège.

=== Works ===
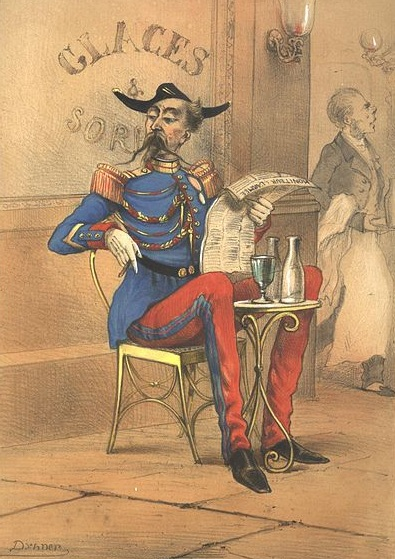
Cent-garde, 1862 caricature by Draner.

- Maxime Aubray, L’album de la Colonelle Paris, E. Dentu.
- Maxime Aubray, Joyeuses histoires du mess et de la chambrée Le 145° régiment Paris, Librairie illustrée.
- Pierre Véron, L'art de vivre cent ans Paris, E. Dentu. (1884).
- Charles Leroy, Les fredaines du commandant Vermoulu Ernest Kolb.
- Adrien Huart, La nouvelle vie militaire Paris, Librairie illustrée.
- Au Bureau de l'Eclipse - Portfolio containing a collection of drawings (Paris, c. 1870)
  - Les Soldats de la République. L'Armée Française en campagne (31 plates)
  - Souvenirs du Siège de Paris. Les Défenseurs de la Capitale (31 plates)
  - Paris assiégé. Scènes de la vie parisienne pendant le siège (31 plates)
- Types Militaires: Galerie Militaire de Toutes les Nations (Paris, Lemercier et Cie, c. 1862–1871)
- Types militaires réédition octobre 2007 C. Hérissey, Janzé, Ille-et-Vilaine. ISBN 978-2-914417-32-7
- Souvenirs de l’Exposition de 1867 Types pris sur nature par Draner Dusacq et Cie.

== Gallery ==
Portraits of actors in their costumes by Draner
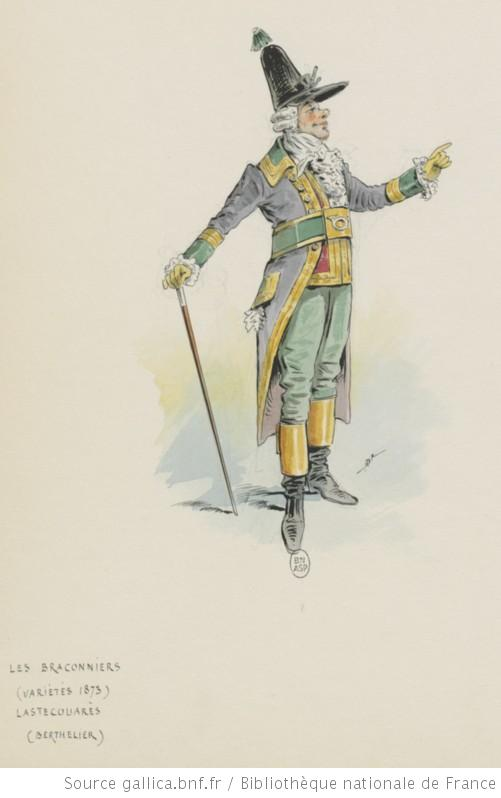
Les braconniers
Jacques Offenbach's opéra-bouffe: Berthelier (Lastécouères - 1873)

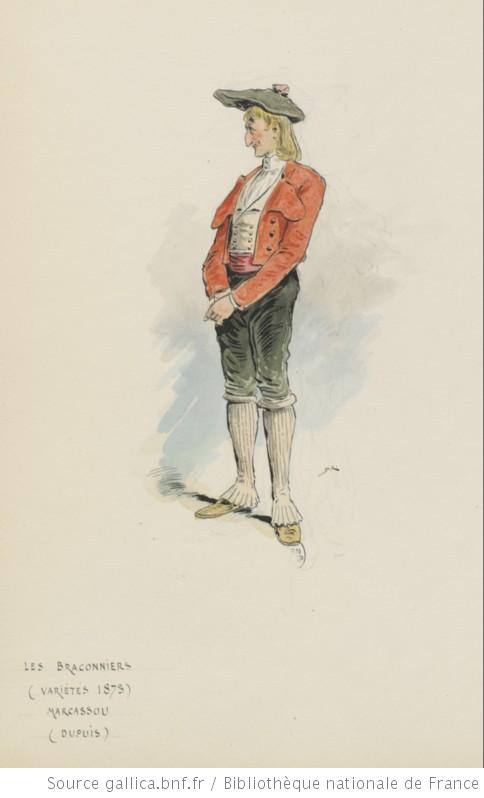
Les braconniers
Jacques Offenbach's opéra-bouffe: Dupuis (Marcassou - 1873)

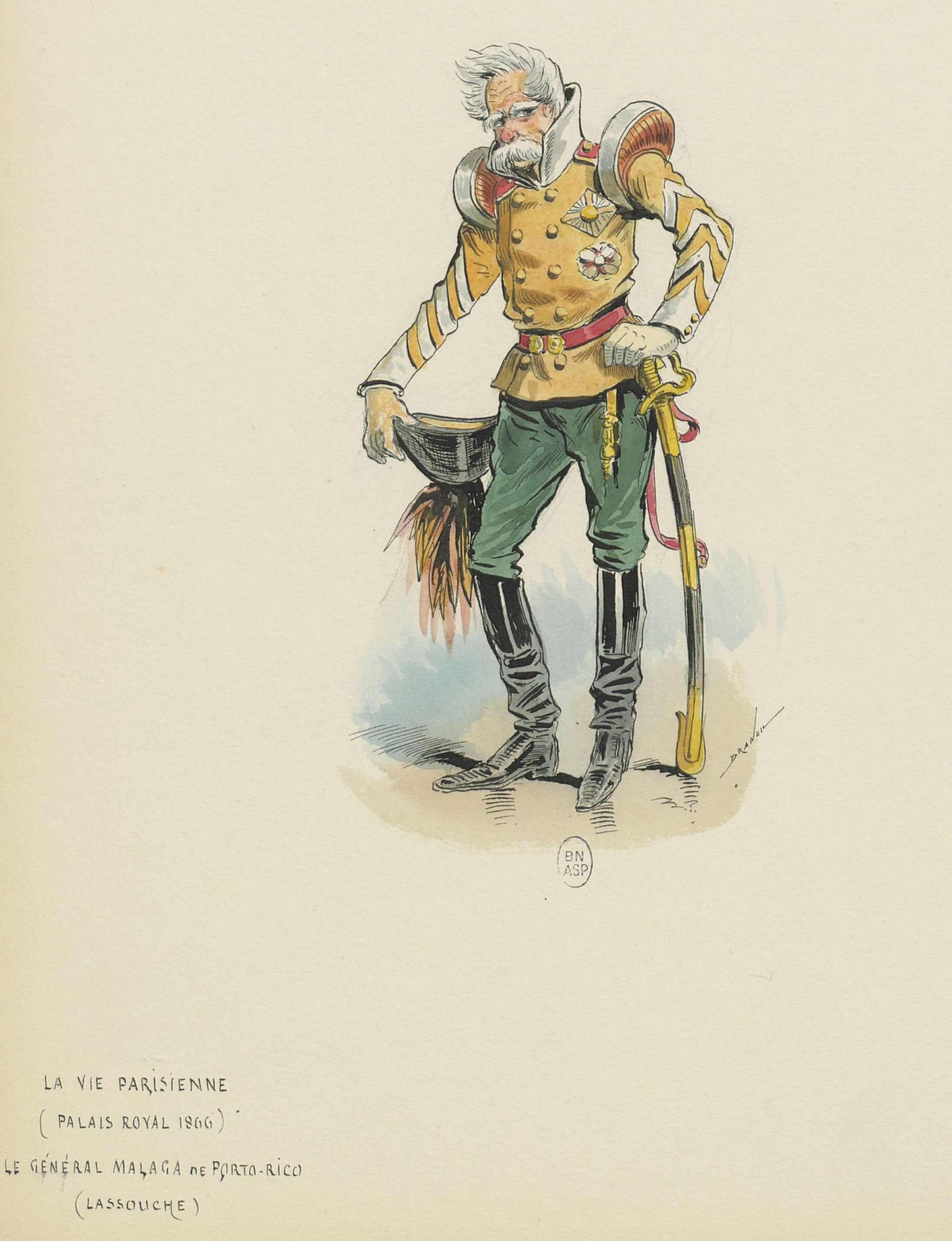
La vie parisienne
Meilhac, Halévy and Offenbach's opéra-bouffe - 1866.

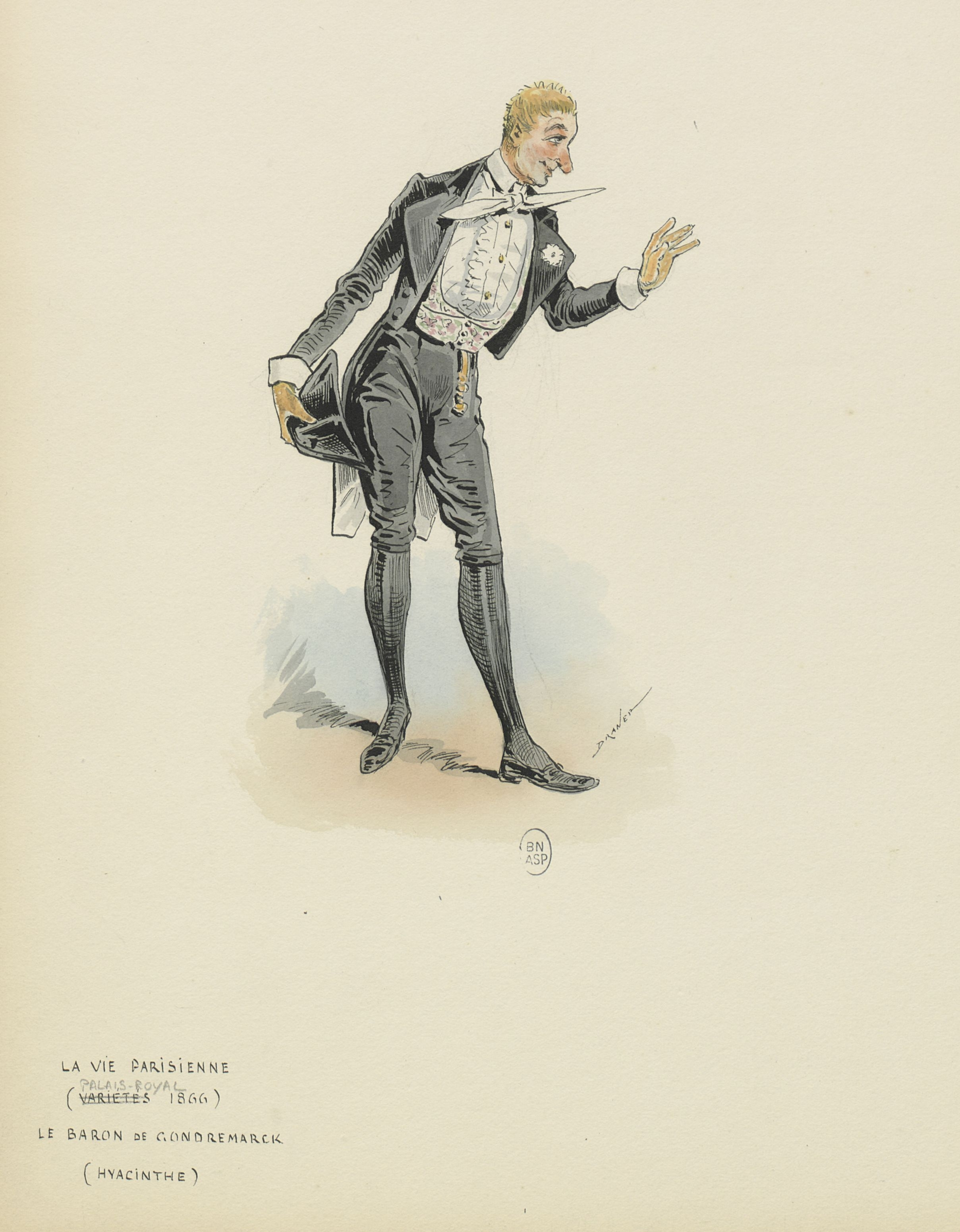
La vie parisienne
Meilhac, Halévy and Offenbach's opéra-bouffe - 1866.

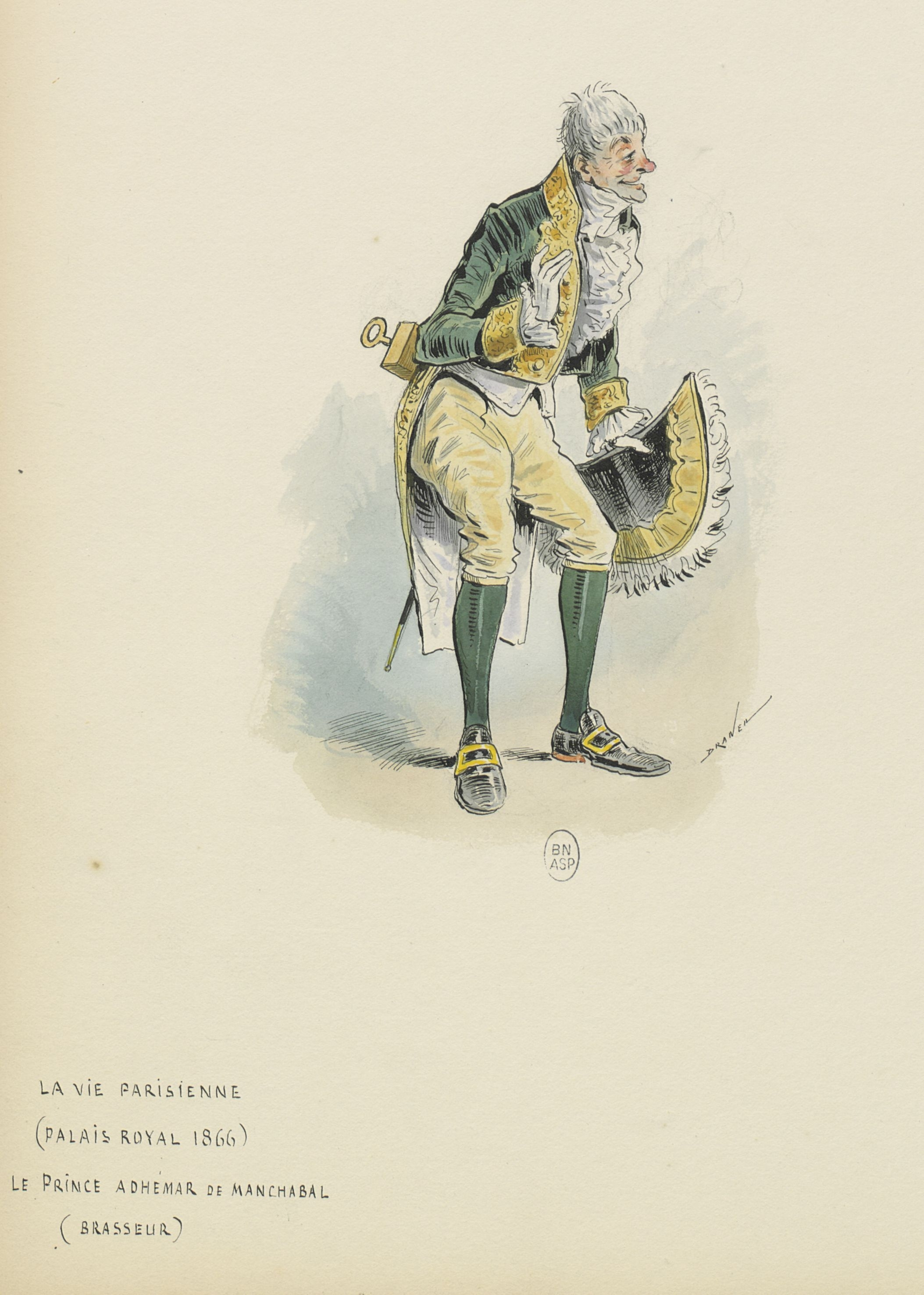
La vie parisienne
Meilhac, Halévy and Offenbach's opéra-bouffe - 1866.

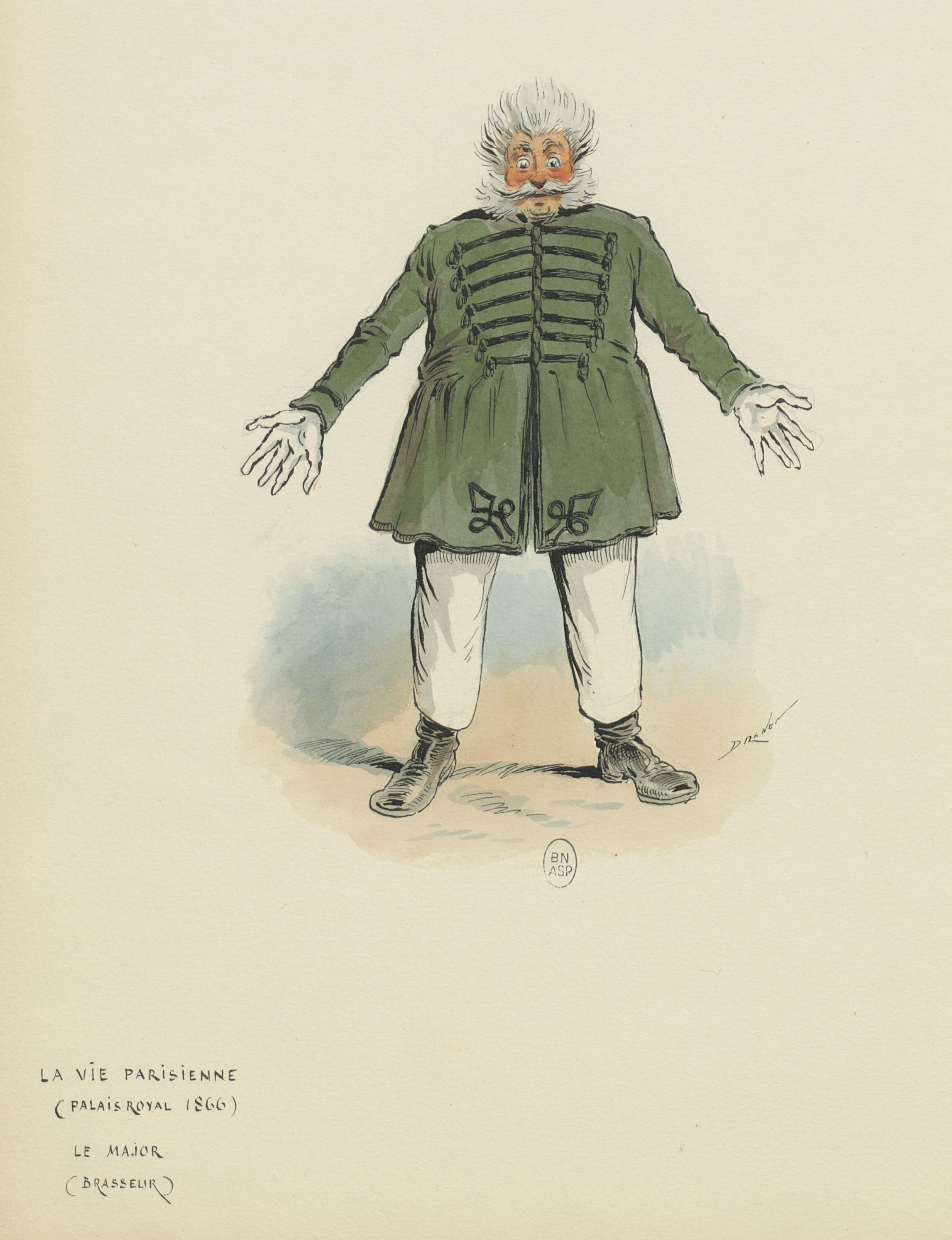
La vie parisienne
Meilhac, Halévy and Offenbach's opéra-bouffe - 1866.

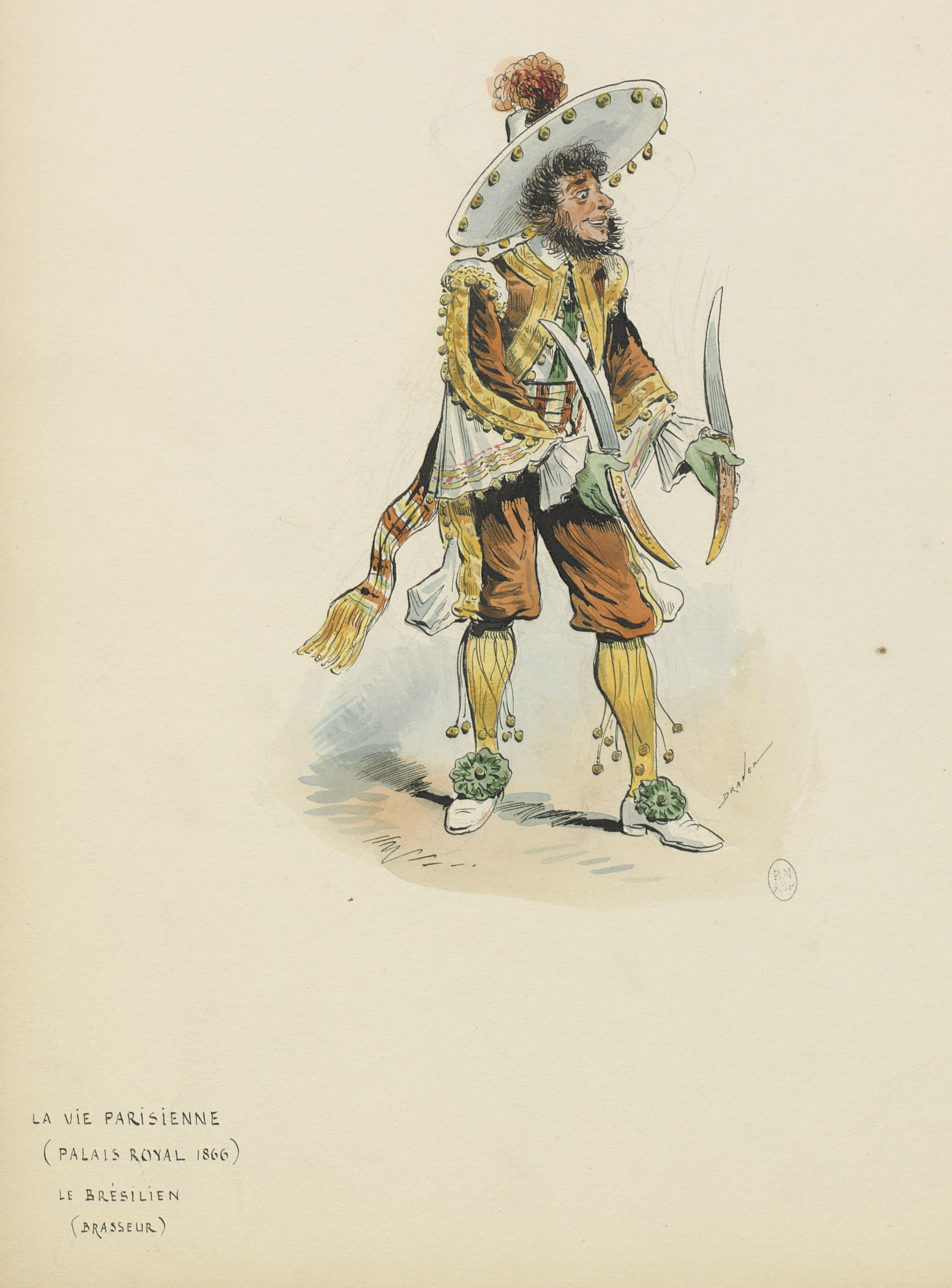
La vie parisienne
Meilhac, Halévy and Offenbach's opéra-bouffe - 1866.

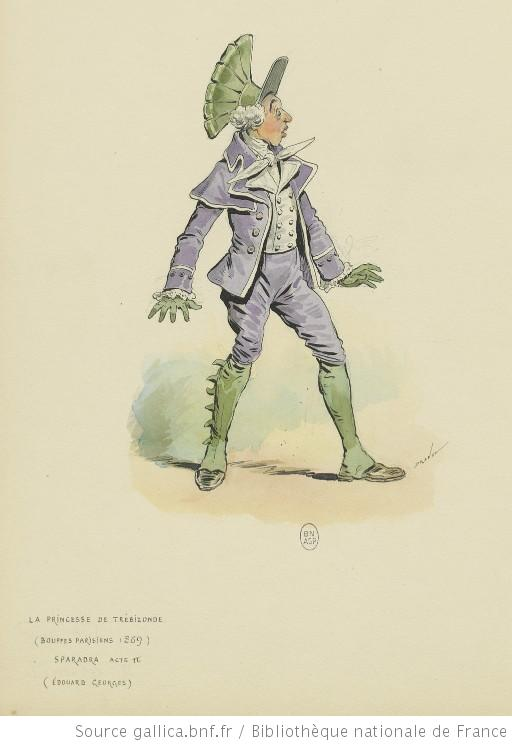
La princesse de Trébizondebr
Nuitter, Tréfeu and Offenbach's opéra-bouffe: Edouard Georges (Sapradrap - 1869)

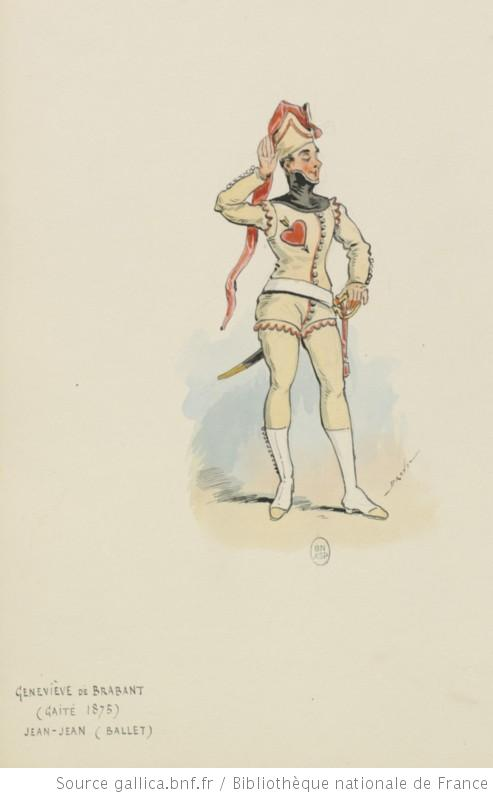
Geneviève de Barbant
Crémieux, Tréfeu and Offenbach's magic - 1875.

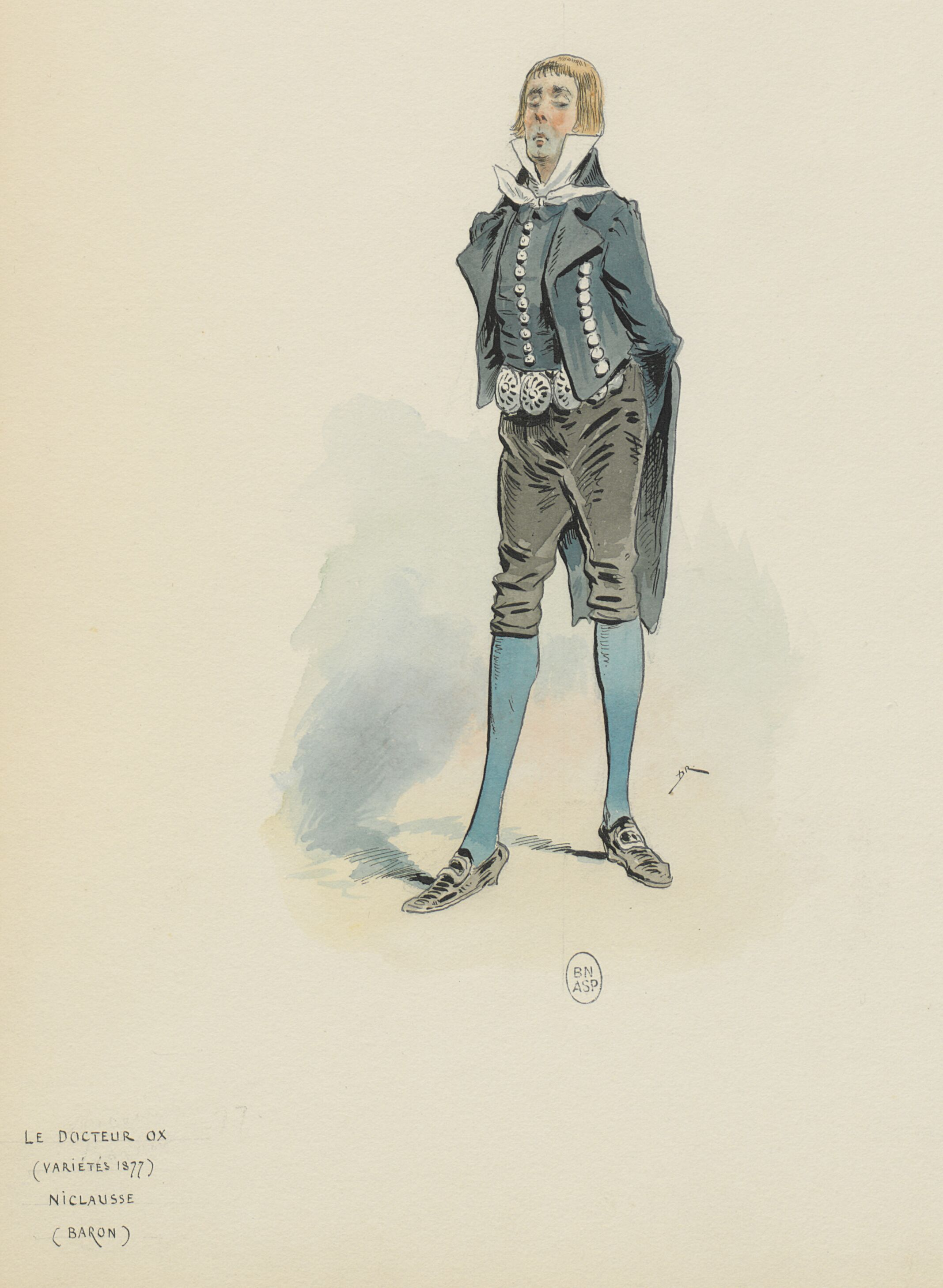
Le docteur Ox. Gille
Mortier, Offenbach's opéra-bouffe: Baron in the role of Niklausse - 1877.

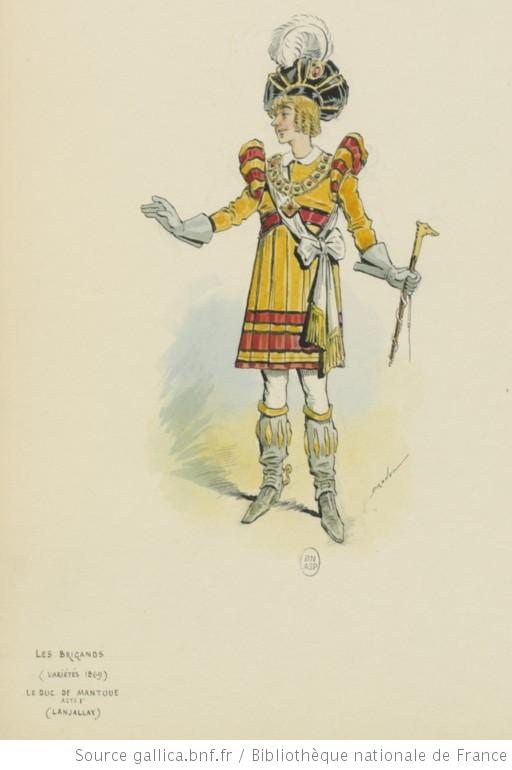
Les Brigands
Jacques Offenbach's opéra-bouffe: Lanjallay (Duke of Mantova - 1869).

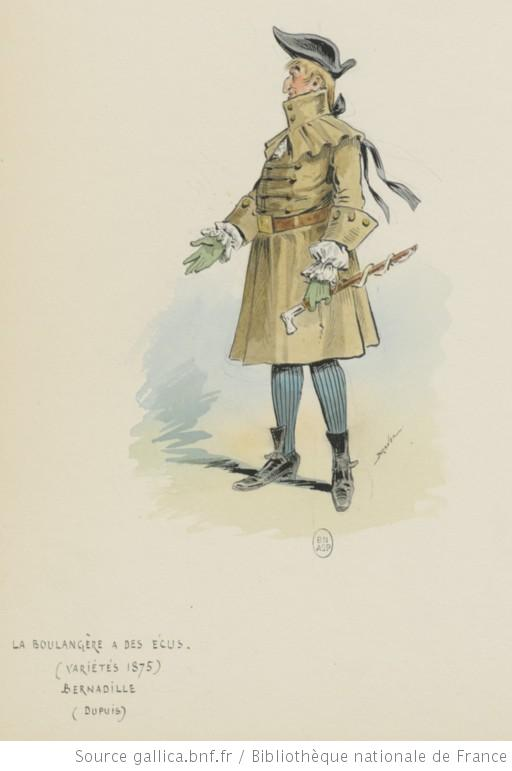
La boulangère a des écus
Meilhac, Halévy and Offenbach's opéra-bouffe: Dupuis (Bernadille - 1875)
