= La Caricature (1880–1904) =

Satirical journal published in France

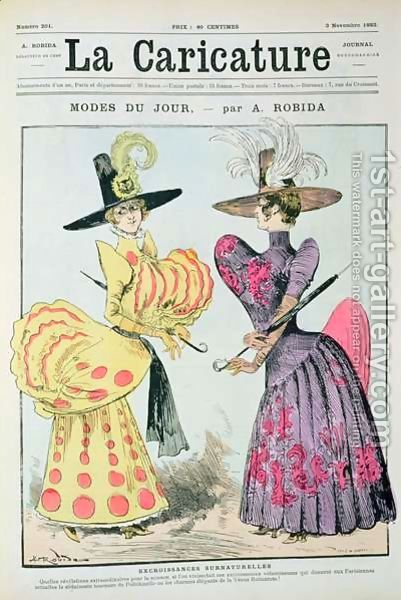
- The Fashions of the Day, 3 November 1883
- Editor: Albert Robida
- Categories: Satire
- Frequency: Weekly
- Publisher: Librairie illustrée − Eugene Kolb − Fayard frères
- Founded: 1880
- Final issue: 1904
- Country: France
- Based in: Paris
- Language: French
- ISSN: 2273-0850

La Caricature was a satirical journal that was published in Paris, France, between 1880 and 1904. It had a lively and colorful layout, and made full use of the newly invented photogravure technology. Its focus was on social satire rather than political commentary. La Caricature covered the theater, news events, gossip and topical subjects such as the vote for women or seaside vacations. The founding editor, Albert Robida, left in 1892. The journal began to decline in quality, went through various changes of ownership and management, and eventually was merged with a rival tabloid.

== Foundation ==
La Caricature was published weekly between 1880 and 1904, first by Librairie illustrée, then by Eugene Kolb and finally by Fayard frères. The founding editor was Albert Robida (1848–1926). The new journal had a lively and colorful format, exploiting the recently invented photogravure technique. The title recalled the earlier La Caricature (1830–1843) founded by Charles Philipon, which portrayed Louis Philippe as a pear, and which included works by the great Honoré Daumier. The new Caricature was less politically engaged than its predecessor, focusing more on caricature of the manners of the age.

== Robida period ==
The first issue appeared on 3 January 1880, heralding a break from the oppressive morality of the regime that had followed the fall of the Paris Commune in 1871. However, La Caricature appeared before the act of 29 July 1881 gave much greater freedom to the press. The masthead of La Caricature was classic in design, at first showing Albert Robida as editor, and La Librairie illustrée as publisher. The offices were 7 rue du Croissant, the same premises as La Librairie illustrée, in the heart of the press district of Paris. The journal appeared every Friday.

With eight pages of drawings, and little text, La Caricature gave stories in pictures without captions, silhouettes, portraits and large compositions, including all forms of caricature at the time. It covered news, literature, theater and gossip, but generally avoided political comment. It often made fun of Sarah Bernhardt, Alexandre Dumas and Émile Zola. In May 1880 La Caricature published a cartoon of Sarah Bernhardt's planned trip to the United States, making fun of her thin figure, her grandiose opinion of her importance, and the public view of her epic battles with adversity. The paper caricatured the Salon exhibitions, fashion and horse racing. It was common for an issue to be devoted to one topic such as women's emancipation, sea bathing or a visit to a château.

The 25 October 1883 issue was devoted to La Guerre au vingtième siècle (War in the 20th Century). It shows a war fought in 1975 between Australia and Mozambique using every possible weapon. Robida borrowed ideas from Jules Verne. Unlike Verne he was unconcerned with whether his machines could really work, purely interested in the image. In other futuristic illustrated stories Robida depicted many grotesque types of mechanical transport, including submarine pleasure boats, as well as television news, video phones, excursions to the moon and synthetic food. Other whimsical concepts of his prosperous world of the future included air taxis, transatlantic balloons, aerial hotels, underwater sports and a women-only stock exchange.

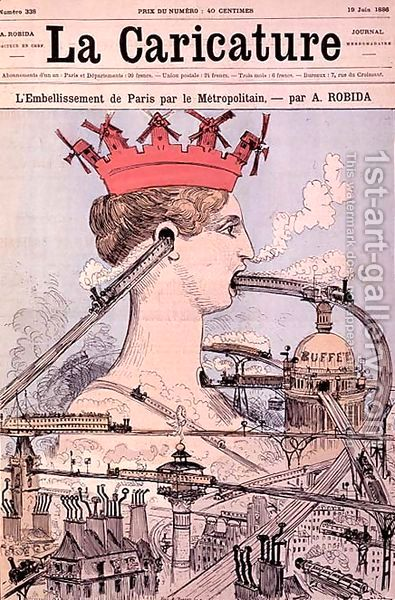
The Improvement of Paris by the Metro by Robida from issue 338, 19 June 1886

Robida was ambivalent about modernization. His drawing of The Embellishment of Paris by the Metro appeared on the 19 June 1886 cover. Robida depicts Paris as a woman, her crown adorned with the windmills that had once stood on the hills of the city, violated by a network of railways that run over or through famous structures of the city.

Robida used color boldly, in contrast to other journals of the time. La Caricature gave good coverage to theater in the early years, typically focusing on one production. This was not advertising. The journal did not produce posters for the shows, but gave pictures that captured the mood of the shows in exaggerated form, with critical comment written in a satirical vein. The large theatrical pictures drawn by Robida mainly appeared in the first three years. They were revived in 1897 when the journal was under new management, now drawn by Maurice Radiguet.

The work of young artists such as Ferdinand Bac, Caran d'Ache and Louis Morin was published in La Caricature. The cartoonist Draner (Jules Jean Georges Renard; 1833–1926) contributed illustrations, including most of the military items and also caricatures of sportsmen, domestic servants in large houses and people wearing the ridiculous fashions of past periods, such as the days of Louis Philippe. The cartoonist Job (Jacques Onfroy de Bréville; 1858–1931) also contributed cartoons, depicting horses and small scenes of gallantry.

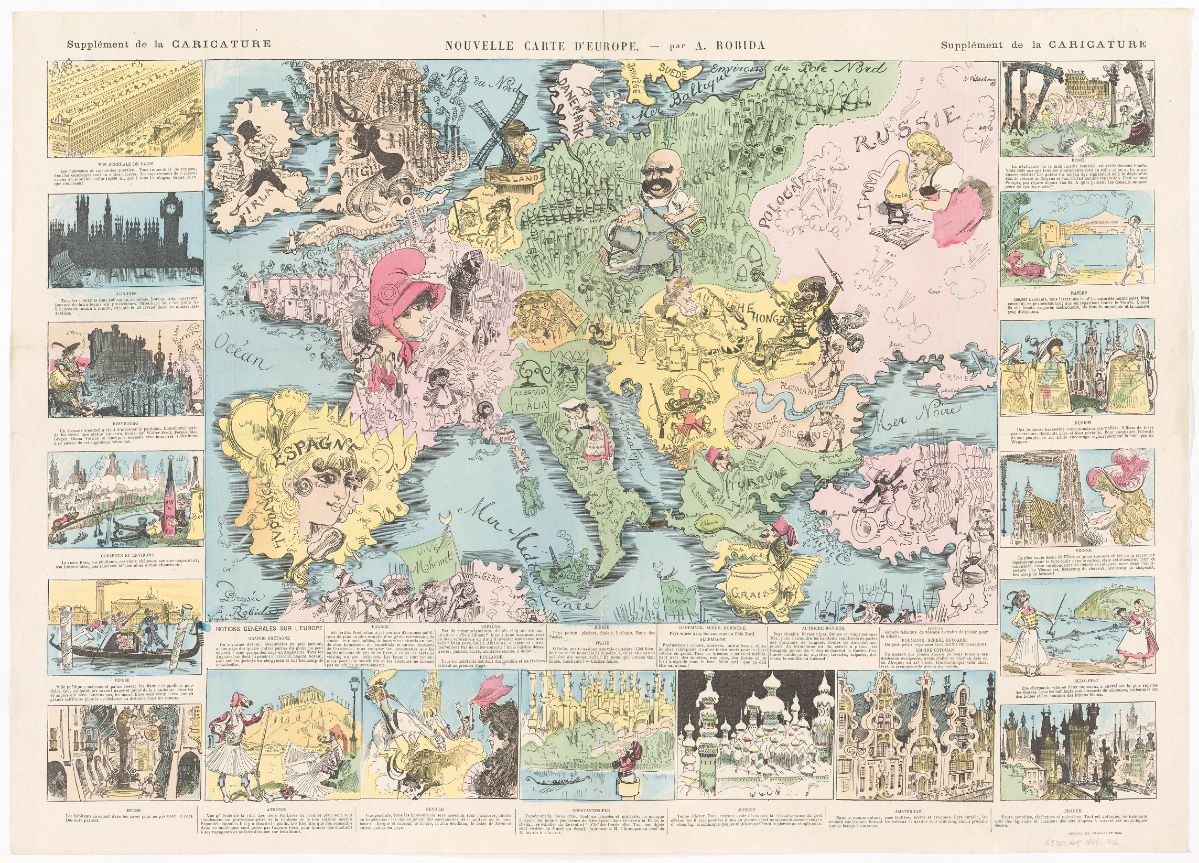
"Nouvelle carte d'Europe," by A. Robida. Published as a supplement of La Caricature. Map flanked by vignettes of major cities. Includes notes. Map of Europe with cartoon-like allegorical and human figures representing individual countries.

== Later years ==
On 2 July 1892, with issue 653, Robida retired after twelve years as editor and Eugene Kolb became the head of La Caricature. With Robida's departure the journal lost some of its graphic appeal, and became more clichéd. On 5 September 1896 Kolb's name was dropped from the masthead of issue 871, which now simply said "weekly journal". In January 1897 the journal was sold to the Librairie Fayard, and Fayard frères began to appear on the masthead.

On 23 January 1893 the office moved to 78 boulevard St Michel, in the premises of the Librairie Dentu. B. Roussat became the manager. Soon after La Caricature abandoned photogravure for halftone etching. There were repeated changes of manager. The paper began to adopt a more strident and populist tone. On 31 December 1904 the last issue of La Caricature announced its merger with L’Indiscret, a black and white tabloid that gave more images than La Caracature but lower quality.
