= Le Vingtième siècle. La vie électrique =

1890 novel by Albert Robida

Electric Life
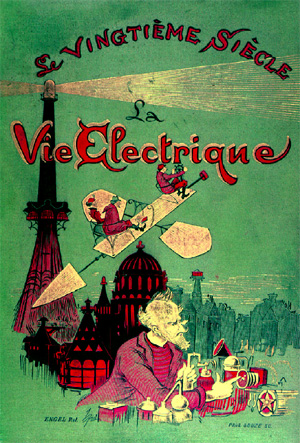
- Author: Albert Robida
- Original title: Le Vingtième Siècle. La vie électrique
- Translator: Brian Stableford
- Language: French
- Genre: Science fiction
- Publication date: 1891
- Publication place: France
- Preceded by: La Guerre au vingtième siècle

Le Vingtième siècle. La vie électrique (1890) is a science fiction novel written by the French author Albert Robida. It aims to describe various aspects of life in France in 1955. Robida weaves the scientific work and technological advances made by the illustrious French scientist Philox Lorris into his plot. A great emphasis is put on how the new technology has transformed the French society and individual lives of people. The novel is written in a lively tone and contains many comic situations. The original French edition included multiple illustrations drawn by the author which are executed in a satirical style reflecting Robida's other occupation as a caricaturist.

== Background ==
La Vie électrique by Albert Robida, translated as Electric Life, was serialized in La Science Illustrée from 28 November 1891 to 30 July 1892 and published in book form by La Librairie Illustrée in 1892. It was advertised as a continuation of the Vingtième siècle sequence which had begun with Le Vingtième siècle, and was presumably commissioned by Louis Figuier, the editor of La Science illustrée for the roman scientifique section of the magazine with that specific brief. The author subsequently added a fourth long story to the series in the novella Un Potache en 1950 as an afterthought.

== Plot summary ==
An electric storm raging in France as a result of the breakdown at one of the electric stations accidentally puts in contact George Lorris and Estelle Lacombe who meet each other via the téléphonoscope. George, a lieutenant of the French army in the corps of chemical engineers, is the only son of the great scientist and inventor Philox Lorris. Estelle belongs to a middle class family. George is planning to marry Estelle, a plan which encounters opposition from his father. The latter wants to marry George to either La Doctoresse Bardoz or La Senatrice Coupard, de la Sarthe, either of which is a woman of great accomplishments. George insists on his original intention, and when he and his bride embark on a pre-nuptial journey, Philox Lorris employs his colleague Sulfatin to break the relationship of the couple. Instead of the tour over the factories and scientific laboratories suggested by Philox Lorris and intended to fatigue the young pair, George takes Estelle and Sulfatin to a quiet village whose inhabitants resist modern technology and live in the traditions of the 19th century.

Sulfatin takes along on a journey his ward and patient, an invalid Adrien La Héronnière who is suffering from the exhaustion of the body due to an intensive mental work during his lifetime. Despite the instructions of Philox Lorris, Sulfatin does not meddle in the relationship of George and Estelle, apparently trying to make his boss disinherit George. This would make Sulfatin the sole successor of the great scientist. Philox Lorris seeing the failure of his plans, engages George in military maneuvers where George excels and advances in esteem of his bride even further. When George returns from his trip, more than ever convinced in the rightness of his decision to marry Estelle, his father becomes furious. Still, Philox Lorris believes he can alter the choice of his son.

Philox Lorris is working on his two novel scientific applications: a biological weapon and a vaccine that is meant to give boost to one's health. To promote these achievements and lobby them on a political level, he organizes a large party at his house to which he invites various dignitaries, including Arsène de Marettes, a prominent political figure. George is asked to collect the video-recordings of the greatest singers and performers of the past and play them for the audience. Unfortunately, as the party begins and the videos are played out, the sound quality turns out to be mediocre. The voices recorded on the tapes sound as if their owners caught a cold. This is due to Sulfatin's absent-mindedness: he took the tapes out to a chilly air last night. Due to this unforeseen circumstance, the video concert is going to be stopped in the middle. However, Estelle had taken the copies of the tapes for her personal enjoyment, and since the copies have not been affected by the cold air, she is able to replace the originals with them after which the concert continues with great success.

Meanwhile, Philox Lorris explains his inventions to politicians. Sulfatin who is assisting him with the demonstrations, confuses the health vaccine with the biological weapon and lets some of the latter escape into the room where the guests are gathered. Panic ensues; and many people including Philox Lorris and Sulfatin are poisoned. Luckily, the weapon is not lethal, and only incapacitates the affected. The house of Philox Lorris is transformed into a hospital where the guests (named the martyrs of the science in newspapers) occupy sick-beds. Philox Lorris and Sulfatin quarrel, but soon notice that Adrien La Héronnière recently cured by Sulfatin by the vaccine is immune to the poison.

Philox Lorris has an idea: he tries the vaccine on himself and in two days recovers completely. He repeats the application of the vaccine on the rest of the sick and achieves the desired effect. This makes a phenomenal advertisement of the vaccine which is immediately accepted as panacea on a national level. George marries Estella, and Philox Lorris has to save his face before La Doctoresse Bardoz and La Senatrice Coupard, de la Sarthe having previously offered the hand of George to both. He escapes the looming lawsuits by managing to marry La Senatrice Coupard, de la Sarthe to Sulfatin and La Doctoresse Bardoz to Adrien La Héronnière.

== Technological devices ==
The technological devices mentioned in Le Vingtième siècle. La vie électrique and non-existent in 1890 include:

- Les tubes - a form of transportation operating above the city and reminiscent of modern rapid transit
- Le phonographe - a device through which two people can talk at a distance and reminiscent of a telephone
- Le téléphonoscope - a device that has the form of a large ovoid screen that is capable of transmitting visual information. In the novel it combines the capabilities of the modern TV, VCR and webcam.
- Hélicoptère, aéronef - vehicles that serve for individual transportation and can move through the air
- Sous-marine - a military watercraft reminiscent of a modern submarine

== Social phenomena ==
Among the social phenomena predicted in the novel are:

- The emancipation of women and the creation of feminine political parties
- Biological warfare, praised as a humane alternative to a traditional military combat. The idea that the biological weapons will kill the weak and only temporarily incapacitate the healthy (thus selecting the people who are more fit for the propagation of the human race) borders on fascism
- The importance of scientific education and increasing complexity of scientific knowledge
- The debilitating effect that an intensive mental labor can have on humans
- The invasion of Chinese forces on Europe in 1941 (la grande invasion chinoise)
- The harmful consequences of science going out of control: for example, the electric storm created by the malfunction at one of the electric stations and the leakage of the biological weapons

== Recent editions ==
- Elibron Classics series, 2006. ISBN 0-543-90536-5 (paperback)
- Elibron Classics series, 2006. ISBN 0-543-90535-7 (hardback)
