= Albert Robida =

French illustrator (1848-1926)

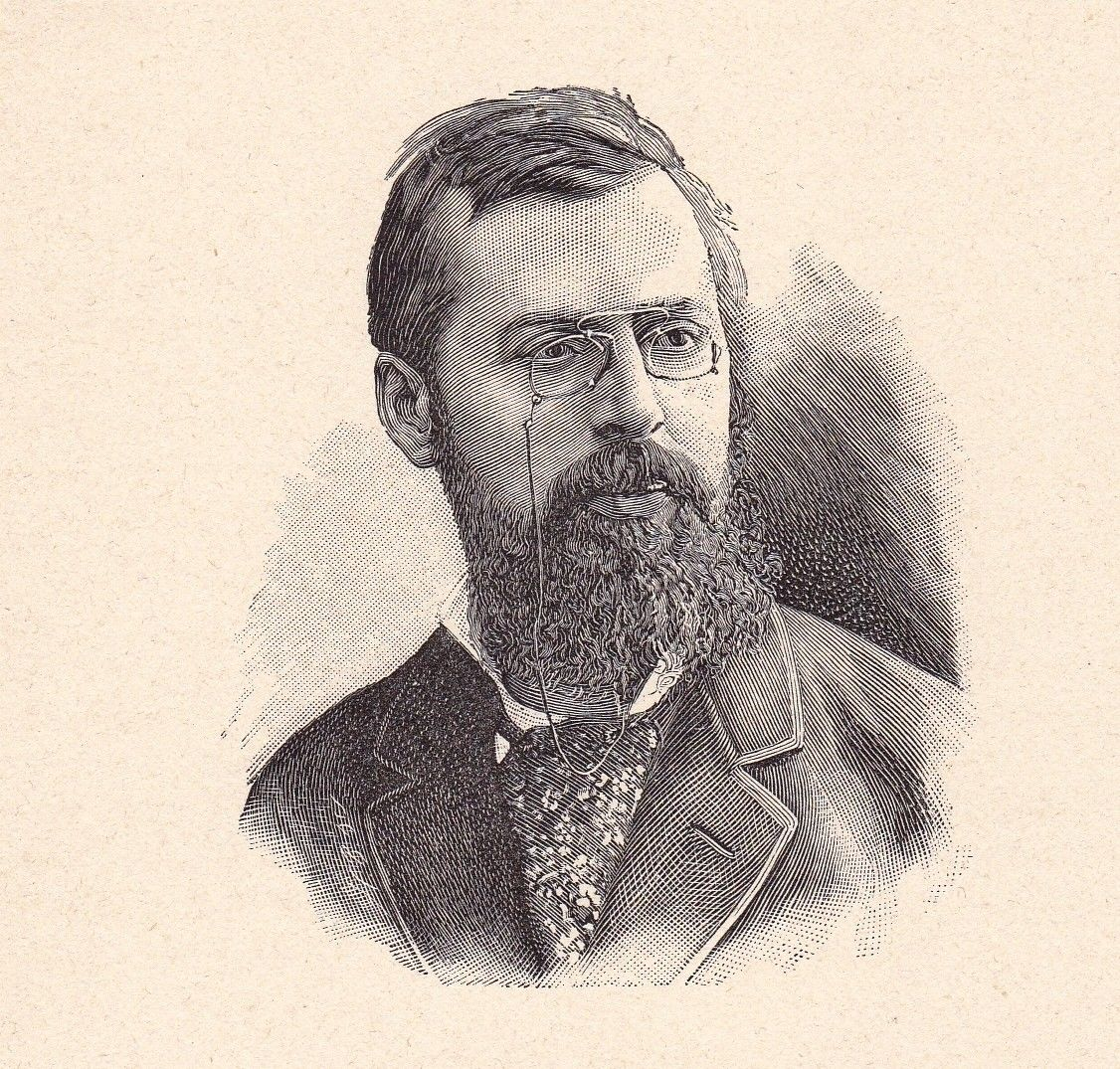
- Robida c.1894
- Born: 14 May 1848; Compiègne, France
- Died: 11 October 1926 (aged 78); Neuilly-Sur-Seine, France
- Occupations: Writer, illustrator, etcher, lithographer, caricaturist, novelist, publisher
- Writing career
- Genres: Children's Books, Graphic novels

Albert Robida (14 May 1848 – 11 October 1926) was a French illustrator, etcher, lithographer, caricaturist, and novelist. He edited and published La Caricature magazine for 12 years. Through the 1880s, he wrote an acclaimed works of early science fiction, especially La Guerre au vingtième siècle(1887) and Le Vingtième siècle. La vie électrique (1890).

== Early life and education ==
Albert Robida was born in 1848 in Compiègne, Northern France, the son of a carpenter. He studied to become a notary, but was more interested in caricature.

== Career ==
In 1866 he joined Journal amusant as an illustrator. In 1880, with Georges Decaux, he founded his own magazine La Caricature, which he edited for 12 years. He illustrated tourist guides, works of popular history, and literary classics. His fame disappeared after World War I.

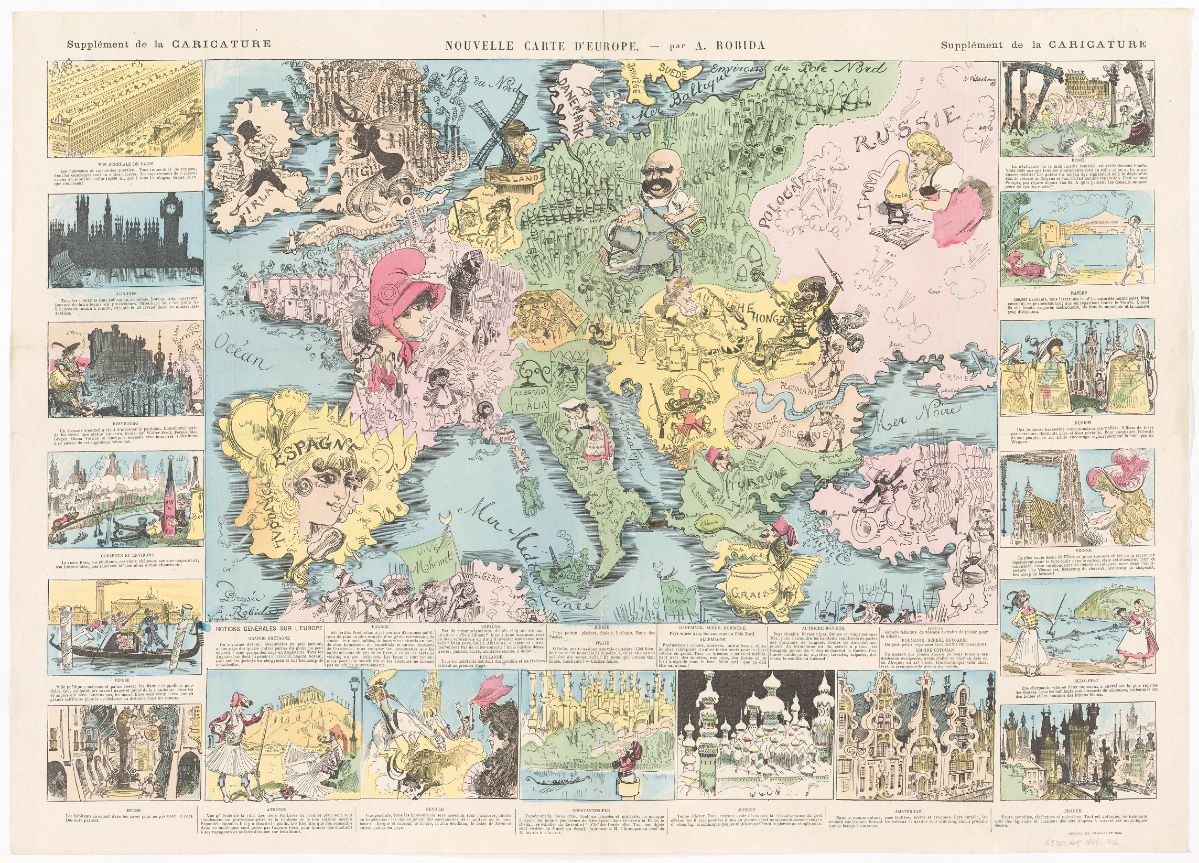
Nouvelle carte d'Europe

=== Futuristic trilogy ===
Albert Robida wrote a number of works of early science fiction, especially:

- Le Vingtième Siècle (1883)
- La Guerre au vingtième siècle (1887)
- Le Vingtième siècle. La vie électrique (1890)

In these, he described inventions integrated into everyday life, and imagined the social developments that arose from them: social advancement of women, mass tourism, pollution, etc. His La Guerre au vingtième siècle describes modern warfare, with robotic missiles and poison gas. His Téléphonoscope was a flat screen television display that delivered the latest news 24-hours a day, the latest plays, courses, and teleconferences.

=== Works with Pierre Giffard ===
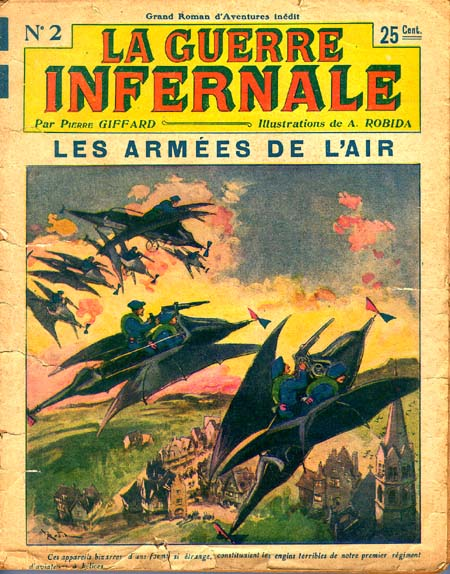
La Guerre Infernale, Episode 2, January 1908

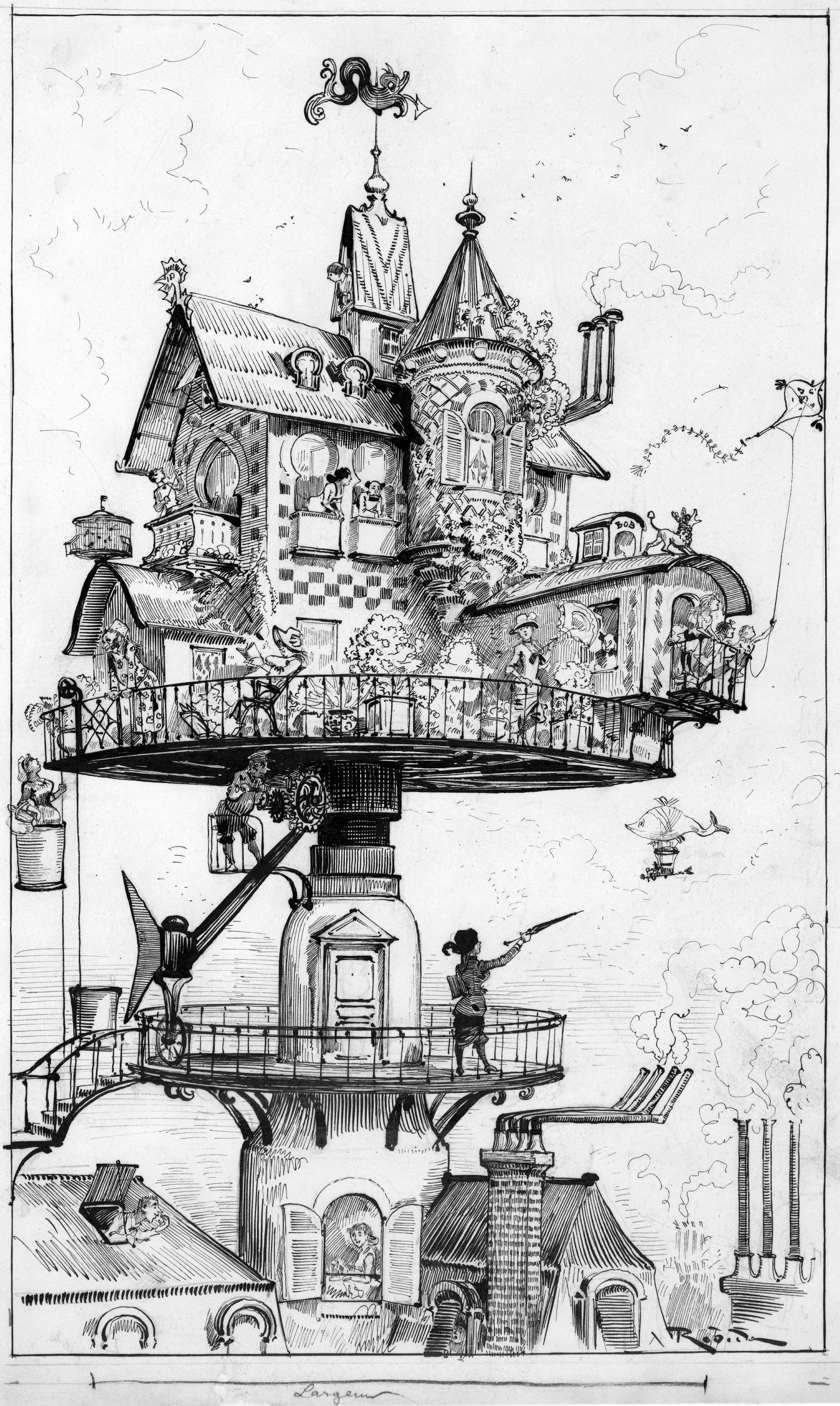
"Maison tournante aérienne" (aerial rotating house). One of Robida's drawings for his book Le Vingtième Siècle, a nineteenth-century conception of life in the twentieth century. Ink over graphite underdrawing, c. 1883, digitally restored.

Robida illustrated two works by Pierre Giffard:

- La Fin du Cheval ("The End of the Horse"), on the inevitable replacement of the horse by the bicycle and then by the car.
- La Guerre Infernale ("The Infernal War"), a 1908 serial adventure novel for children that appeared weekly every Saturday. Robida contributed 520 illustrations. The novel is set in the future and features uncanny parallels to World War Two, including an attack on London by Germany and a conflict between Japan and the United States. It was subsequently republished as a book.

== Personal life ==
Robida and his wife Marguerite née Noiret had seven children, three of whom made contributions to the arts. His elder son Camille became a well-known architect. His youngest son, Henry, had been tabbed to serve as consulting architect to the government of Siam (today Thailand), but his life was cut short by World War I. Daughter Émilie was also an illustrator. In addition to several collaborations with her father, she was published in periodicals such as Le Journal pour tous and La Poupée modèle. Another son, Frédéric, was a president of the Touring Club de France. Robida died in 1926 aged 78 in Neuilly-Sur-Seine.

== Legacy ==
École primaire Albert Robida, a school in his native Compiègne, is named in his honor.

== Bibliography ==
Futuristic

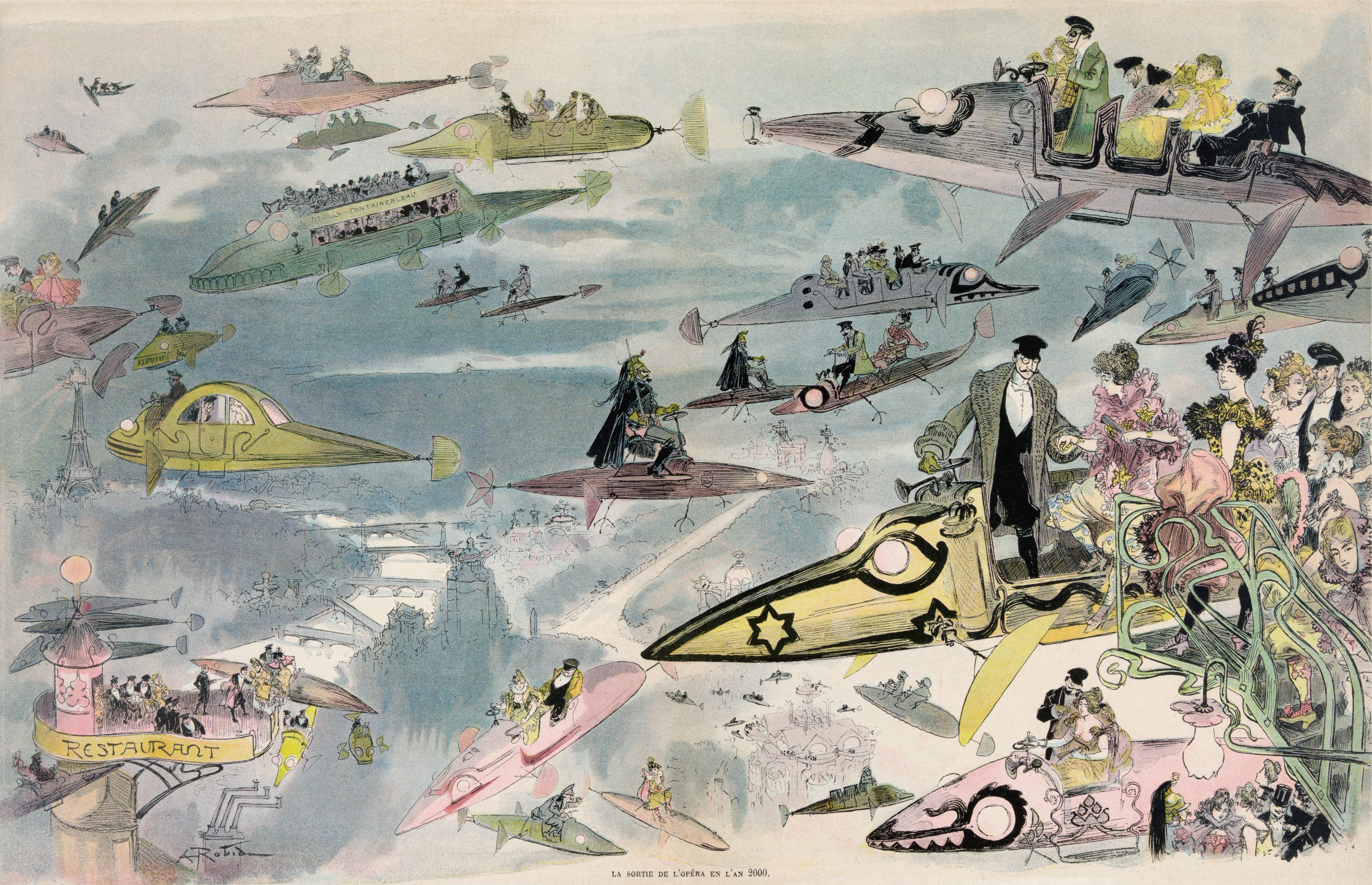
La Sortie de l'opéra en l'an 2000 (c. 1902, digitally restored)

- Voyages très extraordinaires de Saturnin Farandoul, 1879 (translated by Brian Stableford as The Adventures of Saturnin Farandoul)
- Le Vingtième siècle, 1883 (translated by Phillipe Willems as The Twentieth Century)
- La Guerre au vingtième siècle, 1887
- Le Vingtième Siècle. La vie électrique, 1890 (translated by Brian Stableford as Electric Life)
- Voyage de fiançailles au XX^{e} siècle
- Un chalet dans les airs (translated by Brian Stableford as Chalet in the Sky)
- L'horloge des siècles, 1902 (translated by Brian Stableford as The Clock of the Centuries ISBN 978-1-934543-13-9)
- L'Ingénieur von Satanas, 1919

Other work

- L'Île de Lutèce : enlaidissements et embellissements de la Cité
- La Bête au bois dormant
- La Part du hasard
- Le Voyage de M. Dumollet
- Les Vieilles Villes d'Italie : notes et souvenirs
- La Grande Mascarade parisienne
- La Fin des Livres, with Octave Uzanne
- Contes pour les bibliophiles, 1895, with Octave Uzanne
- Les Vieilles Villes d'Espagne, notes et souvenirs
- Un caricaturiste prophète. La guerre telle qu'elle est
- 1430, les assiégés de Compiègne
- Paris de siècle en siècle; le cœur de Paris, splendeurs et souvenir
- Le 19^{e} siècle
- Les Escholiers du temps jadis
- Les Vieilles Villes d'Italie : notes et souvenirs
- François Ier (Le Roi Chevalier), 1909, with texts by Georges Gustave-Toudouze
- Le Voyage de M. Dumollet

La Vieille France series

- La Bretagne, text, drawings and 40 additional lithographies hors by A. Robida, Paris, Librairie illustrée, ca. 1900, 336 p.
- La Touraine, text, drawings and lithography by A. Robida, Paris, La Librairie Illustrée, 336 p., 40 illustrations, undated [1892]. Tome II: Le Mans, Laval, Sablé, Angers, Saumur, Thouars, Loudun, Chinon, Vendôme
- Normandy, text, drawings and lithographies by A. Robida, Paris, La Librairie illustrée, undated [1890], 331 pages, 40 additional duotone illustrations. Tome II: Bayeux, Lisieux, Bernay, Honfleur, Le Havre, Fécamp, Dieppe, Eu, Rouen, Louviers, Évreux, Vernon. Republished: Éd. de Crémille, Genève, 1994, 169 p.
- Provence, Paris, À la Librairie illustrée, undated [1893], 332 p. Avignon, Barbentane, Orange, Carpentras, Vaucluse, Cavaillon, Sisteron, Tarascon, Beaucaire, Arles, Marseille, Toulon, Fréjus, Nice, Monaco, Menton, Aix, Nîmes, Uzès, Montpellier, Béziers, Narbonne, Carcassonne
- Paris, Splendeurs et Souvenirs, Éditions de Crémille, Genève, 1992, textes, dessins et lithographies par A. Robida, 824 p., 2 volumes. Tome 1 : Le Cœur de Paris, 412 p. Tome 2 : Paris, de Siècle en Siècle, 412 p.

== Critical studies ==
- Elizabeth Emery, "Albert Robida, Medieval Publicist," in: Cahier Calin: Makers of the Middle Ages. Essays in Honor of William Calin , ed. Richard Utz and Elizabeth Emery (Kalamazoo, MI: Studies in Medievalism, 2011), pp. 51–55.
