= 2010 in public domain =

When a work's copyright expires, it enters the public domain. The following is a list of works that entered the public domain in 2010. Since laws vary globally, the copyright status of some works are not uniform.

== Entered the public domain in countries with life + 70 years ==
With the exception of Belarus & Spain (which has a copyright term of Life + 80 years for creators that died before 1987), a work enters the public domain in Europe 70 years after the creator's death, if it was published during the creator's lifetime. The list is sorted alphabetically and includes a notable work of the creator that entered the public domain on January 1, 2010.

Names	Country	Birth	Death	Occupation	Notable work
Margarete Böhme	Germany	8 May 1867	23 May 1939	novelist, short story writer	Tagebuch einer Verlorenen
Solomon Cleaver	Canada	1855	1939	novelist	Jean Val Jean
Ethel M. Dell	United Kingdom	2 August 1881	17 September 1939	romance novelist	The Rocks of Valpré
Mary Frances Dowdall	United Kingdom	11 February 1876	1939	novelist	Susie Yesterday, To-Day, and Forever; Three Loving Ladies, The Tactless Man
Havelock Ellis	United Kingdom	2 February 1859	8 July 1939	medical textbook writer, eugenicist, psychologist	Studies in the Psychology of Sex Vol. 2, A Study of British Genius
Ford Madox Ford	United Kingdom	17 December 1873	26 June 1939	novelist, poet	The Good Soldier, Parade's End
Sigmund Freud	Austria	6 May 1856	23 September 1939	Neurologist and psychoanalyst	Introduction to Psychoanalysis, The Psychopathology of Everyday Life, Civilization and Its Discontents
Ludwig Fulda	Germany	7 July 1862	7 March 1939	novelist, playwright, poet	Der Seeräuber, Aladdin und die Wunderlampe
Agnes Giberne	India	19 November 1845	20 August 1939	children's writer, novelist, science writer	Sun, Moon and Stars: Astronomy for Beginners, Among the Stars, or wonderful things in the sky
Zane Grey	United States	31 January 1872	23 October 1939	Western novelist	Riders of the Purple Sage, The Rainbow Trail
Richard Halliburton	United States	9 January 1900	24 March 1939	travel writer	The Royal Road to Romance, The Glorious Adventure
Robin Hyde	New Zealand	19 January 1906	23 August 1939	novelist, poet	Passport to Hell, Check To Your King
Vladislav Khodasevich	Russia	16 May 1886	14 June 1939	poet, memoirist	Heavy Lyre, Necropolis,
Volter Kilpi	Finland	12 December 1874	13 June 1939	novelist	Alastalon salissa
Alcina Leite Pindahíba (pt)	Brazil	1854	1939	Educator	Campesinas
Antonio Machado	Spain	26 July 1875	22 February 1939	poet	Juan de Mairena
Leonard Merrick	United Kingdom	21 February 1864	7 August 1939	novelist, short story writer, playwright	Mr Bazalgette's Agent, Conrad in Quest of His Youth
Alphonse Mucha	Austrian Empire Czech Republic	24 July 1860	14 July 1939	Painter, illustrator and graphic artist	The Slav Epic
Kanoko Okamoto	Japan	1 March 1889	18 February 1939	poet, short story writer	A Riot of Goldfish
Llewelyn Powys	United Kingdom	13 August 1884	2 December 1939	essayist, novelist	A Pagan's Pilgrimage, Now That The Gods Are Dead
Arthur Rackham	United Kingdom	19 September 1867	6 September 1939	book illustrator	illustrations for Rip Van Winkle, Peter Pan in Kensington Gardens, Alice's Adventures in Wonderland, Gulliver's Travels
Maurice Renard	France	28 February 1875	18 November 1939	Author	The Hands of Orlac and The Blue Peril
Amanda McKittrick Ros	Ireland	8 December 1860	2 February 1939	novelist, poet	Irene Iddesleigh
Joseph Roth	Austria	2 September 1894	27 May 1939	novelist, essayist	The Wandering Jews, Radetzky March
E. C. Segar	United States	8 December 1894	13 October 1939	cartoonist	Popeye, Thimble Theatre
Caton Theodorian	Romania	14 May 1871	8 January 1939	playwright, poet, short story writer and novelist	Bujoreștii ("The Bujorescus")
S. S. Van Dine	United States	15 October 1888	11 April 1939	mystery writer	The Benson Murder Case, The Bishop Murder Case
Amy Catherine Walton	United Kingdom	9 August 1849	5 July 1939	children's writer	A Peep Behind the Scenes
W. B. Yeats	Ireland	13 June 1865	28 January 1939	poet, dramatist, prose writer	The Wanderings of Oisin and Other Poems, The Countess Kathleen and Various Legends and Lyrics

== Entered the public domain in countries with life + 50 years ==
In most countries of Africa and Asia, as well as Belarus, Bolivia, Canada, New Zealand, Egypt and Uruguay; a work enters the public domain 50 years after the creator's death.

Names	Country	Birth	Death	Occupation	Notable work
Manuel Altolaguirre	Spain	29 June 1905	26 July 1959	poet, screenwriter	Las islas invitadas y otros poemas(The Invited Isle and Other Poems), El triunfo de las germanías (The Triumph of the Brotherhood of the Guilds)
Maxwell Anderson	United States	15 December 1888	28 February 1959	playwright, poet	Both Your Houses, Joan of Lorraine
Edwin Balmer	United States	26 July 1883	21 March 1959	Author	When Worlds Collide
Johan Bojer	Norway	6 March 1872	3 July 1959	novelist, playwright	Den siste viking (The Last of the Vikings), Vor egen stamme(The Emigrants)
Arnolt Bronnen	Austria	19 August 1895	12 October 1959	playwright	Parricide, Birth of Youth
Emil František Burian	Czech Republic	11 June 1904	9 August 1959	poet, playwright	Member of Osvobozené divadlo
Raymond Chandler	United States	23 July 1888	26 March 1959	detective fiction novelist, screenwriter	The Big Sleep, Farewell, My Lovely; The Little Sister, The Long Goodbye
Laxmi Prasad Devkota	Nepal	13 November 1909	14 September 1959	poet, playwright, novelist	Muna Madan, Shakuntala
Apsley Cherry-Garrard	United Kingdom	2 January 1886	18 May 1959	memoirist	The Worst Journey in the World
G. D. H. Cole	United Kingdom	25 September 1889	14 January 1959	political theorist, economist, historian, short story writer	The Brooklyn Murders, The Death of a Millionaire
W. W. Greg	United Kingdom	9 July 1875	4 March 1959	bibliographer, Shakespearean scholar	Dramatic Documents from the Elizabethan Playhouses, English Literary Autographs, 1550–1650
Otfrid von Hanstein	Germany	23 September 1869	17 February 1959	Author	
Laurence Housman	United Kingdom	18 July 1865	20 February 1959	novelist, playwright, illustrator	An Englishwoman's Love-letters, Victoria Regina
Julien Josephson	United States	24 October 1881	14 April 1959	screenwriter	Lady Windermere's Fan, The Bat, Heidi, Wee Willie Winkie
Alfred Kubin	Austria	10 April 1877	20 August 1959	Author and illustrator	The Other Side
Edwin Muir	United Kingdom	15 May 1887	3 January 1959	Poet, Novelist	The Present Age from 1914, The Scots and Their Country
Luis Palés Matos	Puerto Rico	20 March 1898	23 February 1959	Poet	El palacio en sombras (The Palace in Shadows), Falsa canción de baquiné (False Song of a funeral for a child)
Benjamin Péret	France	4 July 1899	18 September 1959	Poet	Le Passager du transatlantique, De derrière les fagots
Sax Rohmer	United Kingdom	15 February 1883	1 June 1959	crime novelist, horror fiction writer	The Mystery of Dr. Fu-Manchu, Brood of the Witch-Queen
Alfred Schütz	Austria	13 April 1899	20 May 1959	philosopher, social phenomenologist	William James' Concept of the Stream of Consciousness Phenomenologically Interpreted, The Stranger
Pauline Smith	South Africa	2 April 1882	29 January 1959	novelist, short story writer, memoirist, playwright	The Little Karoo, The Beadle
Galaktion Tabidze	Georgia	17 November 1892	17 March 1959	poet	The Wind Blows
José Vasconcelos	Mexico	28 February 1882	30 June 1959	philosopher	La raza cósmica (The Cosmic Race)
Boris Vian	France	10 March 1920	23 June 1959	novelist	I Spit on Your Graves, Froth on the Daydream
Percy F. Westerman	United Kingdom	1876	22 February 1959	children's writer	King of Kilba

== Entering the public domain in the United States ==
In the United States, the copyright status of works extends for the life of the author or artists, plus 70 years. If the work is owned by a corporation, then the copyright extends 95 years.

Due to the passing of the Copyright Term Extension Act (Sonny Bono Copyright Term Extension Act) in 1998, works never registered or published before January 1, 1978, and whose authors died before 1940 entered the public domain in this jurisdiction on January 1, 2010. Other works would not enter the public domain here until 2019.

== Worldwide ==
On November 22, 2010, the British Library released 3 million bibliographic records into the public domain.

On December 9, 2010, CERN released its book catalog into the public domain.

== See also ==
- 1959 in literature for deaths of writers
- Public Domain Day
- Creative Commons
