= The Beast with Five Fingers =

1946 film by Robert Florey

- Theatrical release poster
- Directed by: Robert Florey
- Screenplay by: Curt Siodmak; Harold Goldman
- Based on: "The Beast with Five Fingers"; 1919 short story in The New Decameron by William Fryer Harvey
- Produced by: William Jacobs
- Starring: Robert Alda Andrea King; Peter Lorre; Victor Francen; J. Carrol Naish
- Cinematography: Wesley Anderson
- Edited by: Frank Magee
- Music by: Max Steiner
- Production company: Warner Bros. Pictures
- Distributed by: Warner Bros. Pictures
- Release date: December 25, 1946
- Running time: 88 minutes
- Country: United States
- Language: English

The Beast with Five Fingers is a 1946 American mystery horror film directed by Robert Florey from a screenplay by Curt Siodmak, based on the 1919 short story of the same name by W. F. Harvey. The film stars Robert Alda, Victor Francen, Andrea King, and Peter Lorre. The film's score was composed by Max Steiner.

== Plot ==
Francis Ingram is a noted pianist who lives in a large manor house in turn-of-the-century Italy. Ingram suffered a stroke which left his right side immobile, and he has to use a wheelchair to get around. He has retreated to the manor house for the past few years, where he lives with his nurse, Julie Holden; his secretary and astrologer Hilary Cummins; a friend, Bruce Conrad; and his sister's son, Donald Arlington. Holden and Conrad are secretly in love. Holden plans to leave Ingram's service and return to America, but wants to talk it over with Ingram first. Conrad wants her to instead leave immediately, feeling that caring for Ingram is sapping her vitality, while Cummins opposes her leaving at all, saying he will be left with no time to do his work without her to take care of Ingram's needs. After witnessing Holden and Conrad kissing, Cummins tells Ingram of the affair. Ingram, unwilling to believe it, starts to choke Cummins. Holden's intervention saves him, but Ingram orders him out of the manor.

That night, Ingram is awakened by a storm outside. He climbs into his wheelchair and, disoriented by hallucinations, falls down the stairs, breaking his neck. Commissario Ovidio Castanio of the local police investigates the death, and finds no sign of foul play.

Holden, Cummins, Conrad, Donald and his father Raymond Arlington, and Duprex, Ingram's attorney, gather for the reading of Ingram's will and testament. The Arlingtons assume they will get everything, and gloat to Cummins that they plan to have his cherished books shipped off and sold. Instead, Ingram's will grants all he owns to Holden. The Arlingtons threaten to have the will annulled by having Holden found culpable in Ingram's death, as his nurse. Duprex tells the Arlingtons that Ingram wrote an older will which gave everything to Donald, and offers to help overturn the new will in favor of the old one in exchange for a third of the estate. That night, while forging the "older will", Duprex is strangled to death. Only the assailant's left hand (which has Ingram's ring) is seen.

Castanio investigates. Everyone hears Ingram playing the piano in the main hall, but when they go to check no one is there. Castanio witnesses Donald attacked and almost choked to death by the hand with Ingram's ring. He checks Ingram's coffin in the mausoleum and finds that Ingram's left hand has been cut off; and that a hand-sized hole has been broken out of a window from the inside. Outside, leading away from the hole is a trail of handprints. Castanio begins to believe Ingram's severed hand may have killed Duprex.

Cummins sees the disembodied hand while working in the library. He grabs the hand and locks it in a desk drawer. When he summons Conrad and Holden to show them, the hand is gone, and they assume it to have been a figment of his imagination. Donald remembers the combination and location of a safe in the house, and Castanio and his father accompany him to the room where it is located. Inside is the disembodied hand. In a panic, Donald flees the house with Conrad in pursuit. Holden realizes that Cummins is the killer, having acted to safeguard his books, but his conscience is driving him mad, making him insist that the hand did it all. She urges him to turn himself in, promising to speak on his behalf. He instead tries to kill her to keep her from telling anyone else. To stay his hand, she claims to believe the hand is responsible, and begs Cummins to protect her from it. Completely convinced by his delusion, Cummins seizes the hand and throws it in the fire, but the burning hand crawls out and chokes him, fading out of existence after he collapses.

Castanio and Conrad discover a hidden record player with a recording of Ingram's piano playing which Cummins remotely triggered from his desk. Castanio theorizes that Cummins cut off the hand, which he kept in his desk or the safe whenever not using it in an attack.

== Cast ==
- Robert Alda as Bruce Conrad
- Andrea King as Julie Holden
- Peter Lorre as Hilary Cummins
- Victor Francen as Francis Ingram
- J. Carrol Naish as Commissario Ovidio Castanio
- Charles Dingle as Raymond Arlington
- John Alvin as Donald Arlington
- David Hoffman as Duprex
- Barbara Brown as Mrs. Miller
- Patricia White as Clara
- William Edmunds as Antonio
- Belle Mitchell as Giovanna
- Ray Walker as Mr. Miller
- Pedro de Cordoba as Horatio

== Production ==
The film was Warner Bros. Pictures' only foray into the horror genre in the 1940s and was Peter Lorre's last film with the studio.

Graham Baker was reported as working on a script for Warner Bros. in 1945. Robert Florey was assigned to direct with Andrea King and Paul Henreid to star. The screenwriter Curt Siodmak had originally written the film for Henreid, who turned it down. Robert Alda was cast instead.

Filming started November 27, 1945. The piece much played throughout the film is a slightly modified version of Brahms' transcription for left hand of the chaconne from Johann Sebastian Bach's Violin Partita in D minor, performed by Warner Bros. pianist Victor Aller. His hand is shown playing the piano and throughout the movie.

== Release ==
=== Home media ===
The film was released on LaserDisc by MGM/UA Home Video on March 16, 1999, on DVD by Warner Home Video on October 1, 2013, and on Blu-ray via the Warner Archive Collection on October 29, 2024.

== Critical reception ==
On Rotten Tomatoes, the film holds an approval rating of 95% based on 19 reviews.

A contemporary review of the film by Bosley Crowther in The New York Times described it as having "psychological, whodunit, romantic and comedy twists. But this Christmas film package {is] hardly a thing of joy," that "this thriller takes its time in beginning to thrill," and noted that "Peter Lorre is fine as a moody and introspective secretary turned psychopathic case [and] J. Carrol Naish adds a seriocomic portrayal to his thespic collection." Variety reported that the film "gives more credit for intelligence than the average thriller," and that the "best and most gruesome parts of the picture are when Lorre is alone with his vivid imagination."

Author and film critic Leonard Maltin awarded the film two and a half out of a possible four stars, calling it "[an] Intriguing, if not entirely successful mood piece". Bob Mastrangelo from Allmovie gave the film a positive review, calling it "effectively eerie", and praised the film's special effects.

== See also ==
- The Hands of Orlac (1924) – Austrian silent film adaptation of the novel by Maurice Renard
- Mad Love (1935) – American sound remake of The Hands of Orlac
- The Hands of Orlac (1960) – British-French adaptation of the Renard novel
- Hands of a Stranger (1962)
- The Crawling Hand (1963)
- The Hand of Fear (1976) – Doctor Who episode inspired by The Beast with Five Fingers
- The Hand (1981) – remake of The Beast with Five Fingers directed by Oliver Stone
- Evil Dead II (1987) – reference of The Hand and The Beast with Five Fingers
- Idle Hands (1999)
