= The Hands of Orlac =

The Hands of Orlac may refer to:

- Les Mains d'Orlac, a novel by Maurice Renard

and several adaptations of that novel:

- The Hands of Orlac (1924 film), an Austrian film
- Mad Love (1935 film), an American film
- The Hands of Orlac (1960 film), a French-British film
