= Mad Love (1935 film) =

1935 film by Karl Freund

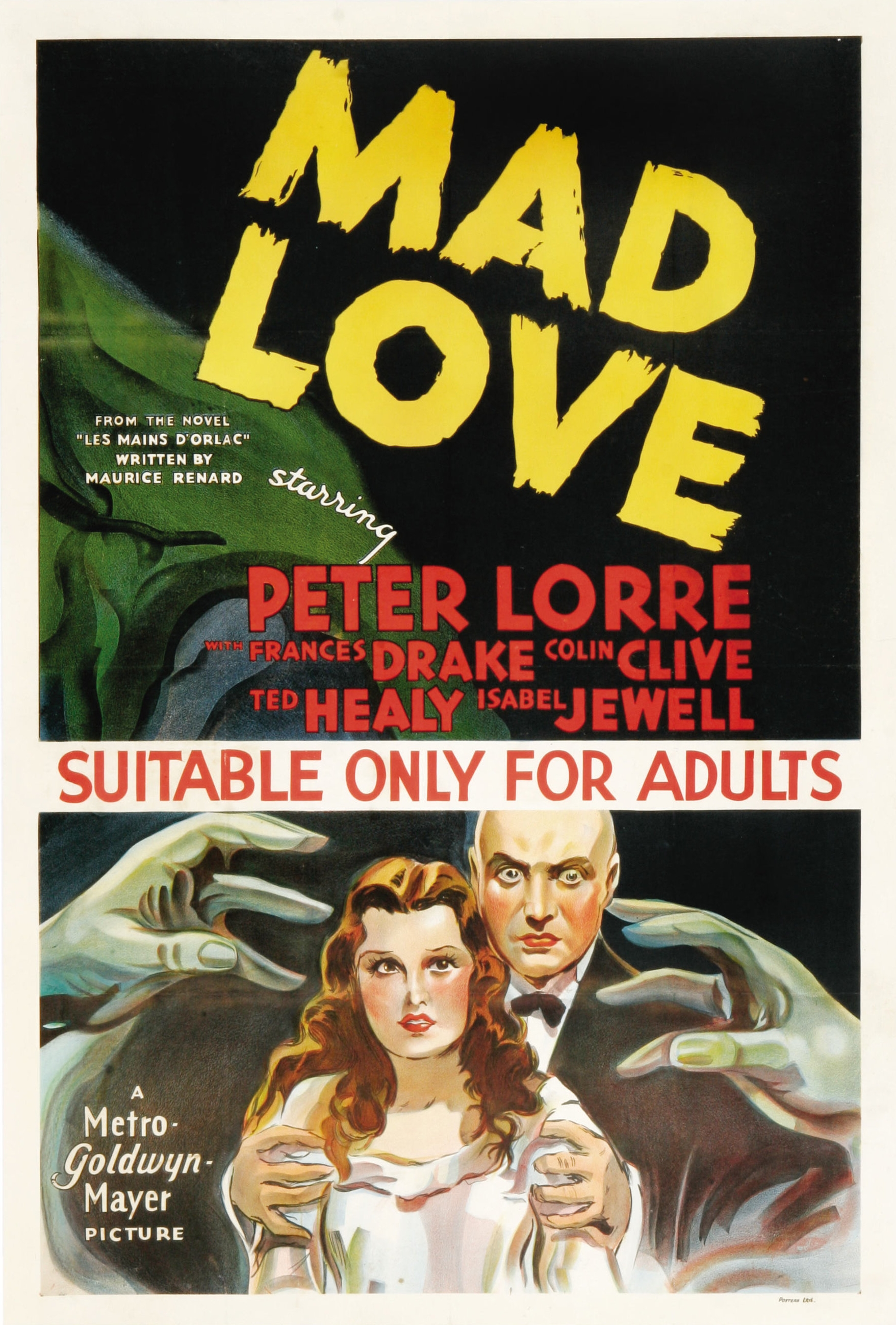
- Poster
- Directed by: Karl Freund
- Written by: John L. Balderston; Guy Endore; P.J. Wolfson; Florence Crewe-Jones (translation)
- Based on: Les Mains d'Orlac; 1920 novel by Maurice Renard
- Produced by: John W. Considine Jr.
- Starring: Peter Lorre; Frances Drake; Colin Clive; Ted Healy; Sara Haden
- Cinematography: Chester A. Lyons; Gregg Toland
- Edited by: Hugh Wynn
- Music by: Dimitri Z. Tiomkin
- Distributed by: Metro-Goldwyn-Mayer
- Release dates: July 12, 1935 (U.S.); August 2, 1935 (U.K.)
- Running time: 68 minutes
- Country: United States
- Language: English
- Budget: $403,000

Mad Love (also released as The Hands of Orlac) is a 1935 American body horror film, an adaptation of Maurice Renard's novel The Hands of Orlac. It was directed by German-émigré film maker Karl Freund, and stars Peter Lorre as Dr. Gogol, Frances Drake as Yvonne Orlac and Colin Clive as Stephen Orlac. The plot revolves around Doctor Gogol's obsession with actress Yvonne Orlac. When Stephen Orlac's hands are destroyed in a train accident, Yvonne brings them to Gogol, who claims to be able to repair them. As Gogol becomes obsessed to the point that he will do anything to have Yvonne, Stephen finds that his new hands have made him into an expert knife-thrower.

Mad Love was Freund's final directorial assignment and Lorre's American film debut. Critics praised Lorre's acting, but the film was unsuccessful at the box office. Film critic Pauline Kael found the film unsatisfactory, but argued that it had influenced Citizen Kane. Cinematographer Gregg Toland was involved in the production of both films. Mad Love's reputation has grown over the years, and it is viewed in a more positive light by modern film critics, gaining the status of a cult classic.

== Plot ==
Actress Yvonne Orlac rests after her final performance at the "Théâtre des Horreurs" (styled after the Grand Guignol) in Paris, France. As she listens to her husband Stephen Orlac play the piano on the radio, she is greeted by Dr. Gogol, who has seen every show featuring Yvonne, and unaware of her marriage, is aghast to learn that she is moving to England with her husband. Gogol leaves the theater heartbroken, buys the wax figure of Yvonne's character, refers to it as Galatea (from the Greek myth), and arranges that it be delivered to his home the following day.

Stephen Orlac is on a train journey from Fontainebleau to Paris, where he sees murderer Rollo the Knife-Thrower, who is on the way to his execution by guillotine. Gogol later witnesses the execution, along with the American reporter Reagan. Orlac's train crashes later that night, and Yvonne finds her husband with mutilated hands. She takes Stephen to Gogol in an attempt to reconstruct his hands, and Gogol agrees to do so. Gogol uses Rollo's hands for the transplant, and the operation is a success.

The Orlacs are forced to sell many of their possessions to pay for the surgery, while Stephen finds he is unable to play the piano with his new hands. When a creditor comes to claim the Orlacs' piano, Stephen throws a fountain pen that barely misses his head. Stephen seeks help from his stepfather, Henry Orlac. Henry denies the request, upset that Stephen did not follow in his line of business as a jeweler. A knife thrown in anger by Stephen misses Henry, but breaks the shop front's window. Gogol meanwhile asks Yvonne for her love, but she refuses. Stephen goes to Gogol's home and demands to know about his hands, and why they throw knives. Gogol suggests that Stephen's problem comes from childhood trauma, but later confirms to his assistant Dr. Wong that Stephen's hands had been Rollo's.

Gogol then suggests to Yvonne that she get away from Stephen, as the shock has affected his mind and she may be in danger. She angrily rejects Gogol, whose obsession grows. Henry Orlac is murdered, and Stephen receives a note that promises that he will learn the truth about his hands if he goes to a specific address that night. There, a man with metallic hands and dark glasses claims to be Rollo, brought back to life by Gogol. Rollo explains that Stephen's hands were his, and that Stephen used them to murder Henry. He also claims that Gogol transplanted his (Rollo's) head back onto his body flashing a leather-and-metal neck brace as "proof!"

Stephen returns to Yvonne and explains that his hands are those of Rollo, and that he must turn himself in to the police. A panic-stricken Yvonne goes to Gogol's home, and when he comes home and sheds his disguise, finds him completely mad. Gogol assumes that his statue has come to life, embraces her, and begins to strangle her. Reagan, Stephen and the police arrive, but are only able to open the observation window. Stephen produces a knife and throws it at Gogol, then finds his way in. Gogol dies as Stephen and Yvonne embrace.

== Cast ==
- Peter Lorre as Dr. Gogol
- Frances Drake as Yvonne Orlac
- Colin Clive as Stephen Orlac
- Ted Healy as Reagan, an American reporter
- Sara Haden as Marie, Yvonne's maid
- Edward Brophy as Rollo the Knife-Thrower
- Henry Kolker as Prefect Rosset
- Keye Luke as Dr. Wong
- May Beatty as Françoise, Gogol's drunken housekeeper
- Billy Gilbert as autograph seeker on the train
- Frank Darien as Lavin (uncredited)
- Charles Trowbridge as Dr. Marbeau
- Ian Wolfe as Henry Orlac (step-father)
- Murray Kinnell as Charles (Theater official)
- Rollo Lloyd as Endore
- Matty Roubert as Newsboy

== Production ==
Florence Crewe-Jones provided MGM with an original translation/adaptation of Renard's story "Les Mains D'Orlac". Writer Guy Endore worked with director Karl Freund on early drafts. Producer John W. Considine Jr. assigned the continuity and dialogue to P.J. Wolfson, and John L. Balderston began to write a "polish-up" of the draft on April 24, 1935. Balderstone went over the dialogue with Lorre in mind, and at points called for the actor to deploy his "M look". Balderston continued his re-write three weeks past the start of filming.

Filming started on May 6, 1935 with Chester Lyons as the cinematographer. Freund insisted on Gregg Toland, whom he got for a reported "8 days of additional photography". Actress Frances Drake recalled difficulty between Freund, Toland and Considine. Drake said that "Freund wanted to be the cinematographer at the same time", and that "You never knew who was directing. The producer was dying to, to tell you the truth, and of course he had no idea of directing." Several titles for the film were announced, and on May 22, 1935, MGM announced that the title would be The Hands of Orlac. The Mad Doctor of Paris was also suggested, but the studio eventually settled on the original title of Mad Love. Shooting finished on June 8, 1935, one week over schedule. After the initial release, MGM cut about fifteen minutes of scenes from the film. Cut scenes included the surgery to get Rollo's hands, a pre-credit warning scene almost identical to the one in Frankenstein, and Isabel Jewell's entire portrayal of the character Marianne.

== Release and reception ==
Mad Love was released in the United States on July 12, 1935 and, as Hands of Orlac, in the United Kingdom on August 2, 1935. Official reaction in the UK was mixed with Edward Shortt of the BBFC initially declaring his intention to ban the film. The initial critical reception, however, was focused on praise for Lorre's performance. The Hollywood Reporter said that "Lorre triumphs in a characterization that is sheer horror", Time magazine called him "perfectly cast", Graham Greene described his performance as "convincing", and Charlie Chaplin called him "the greatest living actor". Reviews for the rest of the cast were less positive. The New York Times said that "Ted Healy, a highly amusing comedian, has gotten into the wrong picture", and The Hollywood Reporter said that Colin Clive "jitters his way through". The Hollywood Reporter wrote that the film was "neither important or particularly compelling ... falls right in the middle between Art and Box Office". Time magazine called it "completely horrible", and The New York Times wrote that "Mad Love is not much more than a super-Karloff melodrama, an interesting but pretty trivial adventure in Grand Guignol horror." Mad Love was not a hit at the box office, and had a small domestic gross of $170,000. Its foreign gross was larger, at $194,000.

Critic Pauline Kael's essay "Raising Kane", originally published in The New Yorker, accused director Orson Welles of copying the visual style of Mad Love for Citizen Kane. Kael noted that both Gogol and Kane are bald, Gogol's house and Kane's "Xanadu" are similar, and that Gogol and Kane both have a pet cockatoo. She also wrote that Toland had "passed Freund's technique onto Welles". Peter Bogdanovich wrote a rebuttal to Kael's statements in Esquire in 1972. Both writers had a negative opinion of Mad Love. Kael called it a "dismal static horror movie", and Bogdanovich described it as "one of the worst movies I've ever seen."

Recent reviews of Mad Love have been much more positive. At the online film review database Rotten Tomatoes, the film has a 100% approval rating, and a 7.5 critical average.

== Home media ==
Mad Love was released on VHS by MGM/UA in late 1992 in the United States. It was released on DVD by Warner Home Video on October 10, 2006, along with Doctor X, The Devil-Doll, Mark of the Vampire, The Mask of Fu Manchu and The Return of Doctor X, in the six-disc Hollywood Legends of Horror Collection. DVD bonus material included film commentary by Steve Haberman, and the film's theatrical trailer.

Mad Love was released on Blu-ray by Warner Archive Collection on October 19, 2021.

== Remakes ==
Mad Love was preceded by the 1924 Austrian silent film The Hands of Orlac, directed by Robert Wiene and starring Conrad Veidt. It was remade in 1960 as a French-British co-production entitled The Hands of Orlac, that was directed by Edmond T. Gréville, and starred Mel Ferrer as Stephen Orlac and Christopher Lee as a new magician character named Nero.

Related films include Hands of a Stranger (1962) and The Crawling Hand (1963). One of Alfred Hitchcock's unproduced projects was The Blind Man, a variant of the theme in which a blind pianist receives implanted eyes whose retinas retain the image of their previous owner's murder. The Quinn Martin anthology TV series, Tales of the Unexpected includes the episode "A Hand for Sonny Blue", rehashing the theme once again.

== See also ==
- The Beast with Five Fingers (1946) – a variant on the theme, also starring Peter Lorre.
- The Hand (1981) – remake of the 1946 film.
- Blink (1994) – a variant on Hitchcock's The Blind Man theme
- Under the Volcano, the novel published by Malcolm Lowry in 1947, includes many references to the 1935 film, under its Spanish title, "Las Manos de Orlac. Con Peter Lorre". Mad Love, is supposed to be shown at the local theatre in Quaunahuac (Cuernavaca, Mexico) when the characters, the ex-Consul Geoffrey Firmin, his former wife Yvonne and Geoffrey's brother come to be reunited. The film and the novel have many themes in common: a strong feeling of alienation, impossible and desperate love, jealousy, the guilty conscience of the creator compromised with evil.
- "Here with Me" music video, directed by Tim Burton and inspired by Mad Love
