= 13 Demon Street =

- Genre: Horror
- Created by: Curt Siodmak
- Directed by: Curt Siodmak
- Starring: Lon Chaney Jr.
- Theme music composer: Len Fors
- Composer: Len Fors
- Country of origin: Sweden
- Original language: English
- No. of seasons: 1
- No. of episodes: 13

Production
- Producers: Gustaf Unger; Ken Herts; Leo Guild
- Production locations: Nordisk Tonefilm, Stockholm
- Cinematography: Johnny Schwerin
- Editor: C-O Skeppstedt
- Camera setup: Max Wilen
- Running time: 30 minutes
- Production company: Herts-Lion

Original release
- Release: 1959 – 1960

13 Demon Street is a 1959 horror anthology TV series. Thirteen 25-minute episodes were produced in Sweden, filmed in English language. The cast was a mixture of American, British, and Swedish actors. The series was first broadcast in Sweden and aired between 1959 and 1960 in syndication.

In 1961, three episodes of the series were edited together to form a theatrical feature called The Devil's Messenger with extra framing footage shot that reconfigured Chaney's host character as Satan. Chaney filmed new wraparound segments to link the three episodes, which were "The Photograph", "The Girl in the Glacier" and "Condemned in Crystal".

In the original TV episodes, Lon Chaney Jr. was the haggard-looking host, introducing each episode from his dreary 'home' at 13 Demon Street. Condemned for some shockingly atrocious crime, Chaney's purpose in relating the series' stories was to convince viewers that the crimes presented in them were worse than his own misdeed, which should free him from his purgatory. This was hard for audiences to judge, however, because Chaney's original crime was never specified.

The series was created by Curt Siodmak, who also directed most episodes (Note: Some sources say that the last episode, Black Nemesis, was directed by Jason Lindsey) and wrote some of the scripts. He had previously written Chaney's 1941 film The Wolf Man and was instrumental in bringing Chaney into the project.

Several of the show's stories were derivative in nature. "The Black Hand", for example, was modelled on The Hands of Orlac, while "The Photograph" is an updated version of the M R James story "The Mezzotint".

== Availability on home video ==
The series was released in its entirety on VHS and DVD-R by Something Weird Video. In addition, two episodes - The Vine of Death and The Black Hand - were included as bonus features on the Something Weird Video/Image DVD release of the 1958 Hal Roach series The Veil starring Boris Karloff. Odeon's UK release of The Veil featured four bonus features - the two Image episodes plus The Photograph and Fever. The episode The Girl in the Glacier was included as a bonus feature on the Special Edition DVD release of Terror in the Midnight Sun/ Invasion of the Animal People (1959).

Although numerous dealers offer the series on DVD or VHS, every existing set is missing most of the Lon Chaney footage, removed by some unknown individual for unknown reasons. Episodes were intended to open and close in Lon Chaney's character's dilapidated home, where he would act as host and comment on each individual story. However, most DVD releases have obvious jump cuts, almost eliminating Lon Chaney's presence entirely.

== Cast ==
- Lon Chaney Jr. host (13 episodes)
- Alan Blair (3 episodes)
- Hilda Bruce-Potter (3 episodes)
- Sydney Coulson (3 episodes)
- Jason Lindsay (3 episodes)
- Charles Nolte (3 episodes)
- Lori Scott (3 episodes)
- Ben Bennett (2 episodes)
- Ralph Brown (2 episodes)
- Pat Clavin (2 episodes)
- John Crawford (2 episodes)
- Doreen Denning (2 episodes)
- Jill Donohue (2 episodes)
- Lauritz Falk (2 episodes)
- Michael Hinn ... Fay (2 episodes)
- Robert Kanter (2 episodes)
- Robert St. Clair ... Man (2 episodes)
- Torsten Lilliecrona (as Tor Steen) (2 episodes)
- Vernon Young (2 episodes)

== List of episodes ==
- "The Black Hand" (written by Richard Jairus Castle, story by Curt Siodmak)
- "Fever"
- "Condemned in the Crystal"
- "Green are the Leaves"
- "The Girl in the Glacier"
- "The Book of Ghouls"
- "The Photograph"
- "The Vine of Death" (written by Curt Siodmak and Leo Guild)
- "A Gift of Murder"
- "The Secret of the Telescope"
- "Never Steal a Warlock's Wife"
- "Murder in the Mirror"
- "Black Nemesis"

== Cultural references ==
The name of the Swedish hardcore punk band D.S.-13 is a play on that of the series.
