= The Hand (1981 film) =

1981 film by Oliver Stone

- Theatrical release poster
- Directed by: Oliver Stone
- Written by: Oliver Stone; Marc Brandel
- Produced by: Edward R. Pressman
- Starring: Michael Caine; Andrea Marcovicci
- Cinematography: King Baggot
- Edited by: Richard Marks
- Music by: James Horner
- Production company: Orion Pictures
- Distributed by: Orion Pictures (through Warner Bros.)
- Release date: April 24, 1981
- Running time: 104 minutes
- Country: United States
- Language: English
- Budget: CAD 6,500,000
- Box office: $2.4 million (United States)

The Hand is a 1981 American psychological horror film written and directed by Oliver Stone, based on the novel The Lizard's Tail by Marc Brandel. The film stars Michael Caine and Andrea Marcovicci. Caine plays Jon Lansdale, a comic book artist who loses his hand, which in turn takes on a murderous life of its own. The original film score is by James Horner, in one of his earliest projects. The Hand was released by Orion Pictures (through Warner Bros.) on April 24, 1981. Warner Home Video released the movie on DVD on September 25, 2007.

== Plot ==
Jon Lansdale is a comic book illustrator, whose relationship with his beautiful wife Anne and daughter Lizzie is in danger. While driving, Anne and Lansdale end up behind a slow-moving truck with an impatient driver behind them. In the heat of an argument, Anne tries to pass the truck, while Lansdale waves at the roadhog behind them. He fails to pull his hand back in the car in time—it hits the truck, and is lopped off. Anne attempts to find the severed hand but cannot locate it.

Lansdale starts a painful adjustment to not having his drawing hand, while Anne tries to repair their relationship and marriage. Lansdale attempts unsuccessfully to recover the hand himself, only finding the signet ring Anne gave him. The couple move to New York and Lansdale is approached by his friend and agent Karen Wagner to co-produce his comic with another artist, David Maddow. Lansdale however, begins to show signs of a mental breakdown, and when he shows the test boards to Karen, they are all marked up. Karen retracts her offer and fires Lansdale, who cannot recall marking up the boards while questioning his daughter about the incident. In a fit of frustration, Lansdale loses his signet ring. Anne is unable to cope with Lansdale's increasingly erratic behavior and general instability. Lansdale becomes jealous of Anne's yoga instructor and begins his slow descent into insanity when an encounter with a homeless man leaves the man dead at the "hand" of his former appendage. It is not entirely clear whether or not this was a real or imagined event. Lansdale begins having hallucinations about various inanimate objects, such as a shower faucet, coming to life as a hand.

After his final meeting with Wagner, Lansdale comes forth with his intention to take an offer to teach at a small community college in California. At the suggestion of his friend Brian, Lansdale rents out a cabin in the woods for the time being. While the majority of his students fail to show an interest in comic books, Stella Roche is interested, and she also takes a personal interest in Lansdale. Anne insists on staying with Lansdale during the Christmas season and he begins to have violent hallucinations about the hand strangling her. That night, the missing ring reappears on Lansdale's pillow.

Lansdale and Stella begin a romantic relationship despite the latter showing an interest in Brian. Not long after, Lansdale meets Brian at a bar, but is confused as he should be on a two-week vacation with Stella. He soon learns that Brian has not seen her since she last went to Lansdale's cabin. Lansdale picks up Anne at the airport, but soon realizes she has no real intention of staying as she previously claimed. He hallucinates the hand strangling her, causing the car to crash in a fiery explosion. While his wife and daughter are at the cabin, Lansdale confesses to Brian that he slept with Stella. Soon after, Brian is killed in his car by the hand.

That night, Lansdale awakens to see the hand trying to kill Anne. Lizzie overhears the commotion and calls the police, and Lansdale chases the hand outside into the nearby barn. The hand tries to attack him, but Lansdale stabs it. The hand crawls to a nearby spare tire where Lansdale tries to stab it again and misses and the hand wraps itself around Lansdale's throat and causes him to lose consciousness.

Lansdale awakens to find his left hand around his throat while the police investigate. The sheriff and his deputies attempt to ask Lansdale what happened. Discovering that Anne is still alive, Lansdale attempts to explain what happened when the officers notice a pungent smell permeating the area in the carport around the car, specifically from the trunk. Lansdale tries to prove that nothing is wrong by opening the trunk, only to be horrified by the sight of Stella and Brian's dead bodies stuffed inside.

At a local insane asylum, a psychologist attempts to communicate with Lansdale. She wants him to remember and admit that it was him, not his severed hand, who killed all the victims. He says that the hand wants to kill her because it hates her. Suddenly, the hand (which may exist or may still be a figment of Lansdale's mind) appears from behind the psychiatrist and strangles her. Lansdale, completely taken over by the essence of the hand, looks at her dead body and starts to laugh. He loosens the restraint on his other hand and gets up, presumably to escape from the asylum.

== Cast of characters ==
- Michael Caine as Jon Lansdale
- Andrea Marcovicci as Anne Lansdale
- Annie McEnroe as Stella Roche
- Bruce McGill as Brian Ferguson
- Viveca Lindfors as Psychologist
- Rosemary Murphy as Karen Wagner
- Mara Hobel as Lizzie Lansdale
- Tracey Walter as Cop
- Pat Corley as Sheriff
- Charles Fleischer as David Maddow

== Production ==
This was Oliver Stone's second feature film as director following 1974's Seizure, and his first film made for a major studio. Like Seizure, The Hand is a horror film and is derived from a similar premise (an artist's slow descent into madness). The general plot, themes, and characters of The Hand resemble those of The Hands of Orlac and The Beast with Five Fingers.

The film was shot partly in Big Bear Lake, California.

The film's special effects were provided by Stan Winston and Carlo Rambaldi. Several lifelike animatronic hands were built, each designed for a specific action or motion (i.e. crawling, walking, grabbing). "Mandro," Prince Valiant/Conan The Barbarian-styled comic book character, was drawn by artist Barry Windsor-Smith, who at the time was a real-life illustrator for the Marvel Conan comics.

When Barry Sonnenfeld was pitching The Addams Family, executives were reluctant to back another film with a crawling body part, given the financial losses of The Hand.

=== Casting ===
Oliver Stone's first choice for the lead was Academy Award-winner Jon Voight, who declined the role. Stone also approached other Oscar-winners Dustin Hoffman and Christopher Walken. Michael Caine, however, after the success of his previous film Dressed to Kill, was interested in making another horror film to earn enough to put a down payment on a new garage he was having built, and he agreed to take the part after talks with the director. Caine's experience with Stone resulted in their being friends later in life, although Stone and Caine have not worked together since.

== Critical reception ==
The Hand has a Rotten Tomatoes approval rating of 29% based on 21 reviews, with a weighted average of 4.4/10. On Metacritic, the film has a weighted average score of 59 out of 100, based on 6 critics, indicating "mixed or average reviews". Allmovie called the film "an overwrought misfire that is best left to horror film completists." The Terror Trap gave it 2/4 stars, stating that the film was "Strictly for Caine filmography completists or Stone enthusiasts." Rob Gonsalves from eFilmCritic awarded the film 2/5 stars, calling it "inescapably cheesy".

Brett Gallman from Oh, the Horror! wrote, "Clearly out the Orlac and Beast With Five Fingers mode, The Hand is just as silly as the fictional comics drawn up by its protagonist, but Stone mostly plays it as a straighter-than-straight schizoid thriller that examines psychological breakdowns more so than the visceral fallout." Vincent Canby from The New York Times gave the film a positive review, writing, "Mr. Stone's screenplay is tightly written, precise and consistent in its methods, and seemingly perfectly realized in the performances of the very good cast headed by Mr. Caine."

Despite receiving mixed reviews from critics, "The Hand" has gained a cult following over the years, with some viewers appreciating its unique approach to psychological thriller elements and Michael Caine's performance in the film.

== In popular culture ==
On the October 23, 1981 episode of the sketch comedy TV series SCTV, the film was parodied as a trailer promo skit as My Bloody Hand with Dave Thomas as Caine's character Bubba Ashley, a writer from Jackson, Mississippi and Catherine O'Hara performing Marcovicci's role, as he deals with the difficulties and prejudices of having an exaggeratedly oversized hand by a group of bigots led by John Candy to trying to earn a spot on a basketball team dominated by African-Americans.

== See also ==
- The Hands of Orlac
- The Beast with Five Fingers
- Thing T. Thing
- Evil Dead II
