= Michael Hinn =

American film and television actor

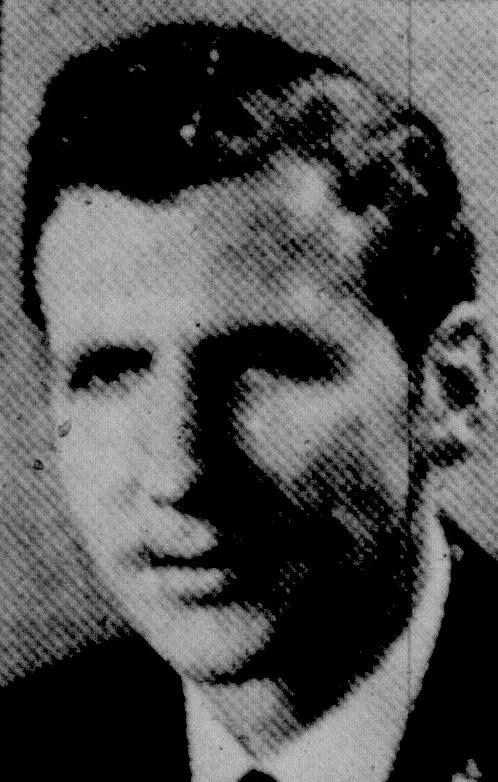
- Hinn in 1939
- Born: September 10, 1913; Virginia, Minnesota, U.S.
- Died: July 2, 1988 (aged 74); Los Angeles County, California, U.S.
- Occupations: Film and television actor
- Spouse: Helen Diller (m. 1940)

Michael Hinn (September 10, 1913 – July 2, 1988) was an American film and television actor. He was best known for playing Scout Luke Cummings in the American western television series Boots and Saddles.

== Early years ==
Hinn was born in Virginia, Minnesota. He was the son of Mr. and Mrs. Will Hinn, and he grew up in Fenimore, Wisconsin. His father was a construction engineer. Hinn's elementary education came in a one-room schoolhouse. He attended high schools in five cities "from Canada to the Gulf of Mexico", graduating from Greenville High School in Greenville, South Carolina, in 1931. After graduating, he attended the University of Wisconsin–Madison, and worked in radio. He was in the university's dramatic school with plans to become an actor on stage, and he had leading roles in some of the plays put on by the dramatic club.

== Career ==
=== Radio ===
After waiting tables and working at odd jobs to pay for his education, Hinn began working at WHA, a radio station in Madison, Wisconsin, in 1932. He left there to act on KSTP in St. Paul, Minnesota. In 1934 he went to be production manager at KFJM in Grand Forks, North Dakota. There his duties expanded to include announcing, and he became the sation's chief announcer. In 1936 he became an announcer at WWNC in Asheville, North Carolina. In 1939 he became an announcer for WLW. He was a news commentator there for three years before he left to go into military service. He also worked at WSAI, both stations in Cincinnati. Some of Hinn's programs on the Cincinnati stations, such as The Nation's School of the Air, were carried nationally on the Mutual Broadcasting System.

In 1948, Hinn was director of news and special events at WKOW in Madison, Wisconsin. He was dismissed from his position in November 1948. The station's general manager would not comment on the reason for the firing. Hinn said that the management of the station apparently thought incorrectly that he was a leader in an effort to have employees join the American Federation of Radio Artists union. After he was fired, his wife and his brother resigned from their positions at the station. In December 1948 the Madison Federation of Labor voted to ask WKOW's management to provide specific reasons for discharging Hinn. The vote included a provision that if no satisfactory explanation was provided, a committee would investigate the matter.

In the early 1950s Hinn was a commentator on KFAC in Los Angeles, after which he was on the news staff at KFI in Los Angeles. He left there in April 1952 to become news editor and commentator for the Liberty Broadcasting System. He had a six-nights-a-week newscast on it.

=== Military ===
After Hinn was rejected by the United States Army Air Corps because he was considered to be too old, he joined the Royal Air Force, and participated in military activity over Europe. He was transferred to the United States Navy, and he flew in combat in the South Pacific. During his four years of combined service he shot down six enemy aircraft. Recognition that he received included a Distinguished Flying Cross, an Air Medal, and a Navy commendation. In 1948 he was selected to be acting commander of the Air National Guard's 176th Fighter Squadron when it became activated.

=== Acting ===
Hinn's first opportunity for acting after he left college came when he performed with the Asheville Summer Theater in North Carolina.

Hinn began his screen career in 1954, appearing in the CBS television series Captain Midnight. In 1956, he appeared in the syndicated western television series The Sheriff of Cochise.

Later in his career, in 1957, Hinn starred as Scout Luke Cummings in the syndicated western television series Boots and Saddles, starring along with John Pickard, Dave Willock, John Alderson, Patrick McVey and Gardner McKay. After the series ended in 1958, he guest-starred in television programs including Gunsmoke, Bonanza, Wagon Train, The Big Valley, Rawhide, The Life and Legend of Wyatt Earp, Tales of Wells Fargo, Sky King and The Tall Man, and played the recurring role of George Haig in the CBS western television series Johnny Ringo. He also appeared in films such as The Bounty Killer, Escape from Red Rock, Gun Fever, The Halliday Brand, The Reivers, Valdez Is Coming, and The Devil's Messenger.

Hinn retired from acting in 1972, last appearing in the film The Mechanic.

=== TV news ===
In the early 1950s Hinn had a 30-minute, Monday-Friday newscast on WFAA-TV in Dallas, Texas. He wrote and edited Michael Hinn and the News, which covered local, national, and international developments. A review in the trade publication Variety said, "Hinn's friendly, yet objective manner of reporting the news is a welcome addition to local TV newscasting. The review also pointed out the way he used his memory to provide background information related to current topics. He left WFAA in September 1955, and on October 3, 1955, he began a daily 11 p.m. Pacific Time newscast on KABC-TV in Los Angeles. He had previously been a member of the news staff at KHJ-TV in Los Angeles.

== Personal life and death ==
Hinn enjoyed flying, often making air trips on weekends, and he hoped to have a plane of his own.

Hinn married singer Helen Diller in 1940. He died on July 2, 1988, in Los Angeles County, California, at the age of 74.
