= The Devil's Messenger =

- Directed by: Herbert L. Strock
- Written by: Leo Guild
- Produced by: Kenneth Herts; Gustaf Unger
- Starring: Lon Chaney Jr. Karen Kadler
- Cinematography: William G. Troiano
- Edited by: Carl-Olov Skeppstedt; Lennart Wallén
- Music by: Alfred Gwynn
- Distributed by: Herts-Lion International Corp.
- Release date: 1961
- Running time: 72 minutes
- Countries: Sweden; United States
- Language: English

The Devil's Messenger is a 1961 anthology horror film combining 3 episodes of the 1959 black & white Swedish television series 13 Demon Street (which was never broadcast in the USA) with some new scenes featuring Lon Chaney Jr., Karen Kadler and John Crawford. This "feature version" of the series is the closest the U.S. came to seeing the TV series (although the entire series is now available on DVD in the territory).

== Plot summary ==
The film includes stories about Angelica, a 50,000-year-old woman found frozen in an ice field, John Radian, a man whose death is foretold in dreams and Satan's plans to blow up the Earth with atomic weapons.

== Cast ==
- Lon Chaney Jr. as Satan
- Karen Kadler as Satanya
- Michael Hinn as John Radian
- Ralph Brown as Charlie
- John Crawford as Donald Powell
- Bert Johnson as Dr. Ben Seastrom
- Chalmers Goodlin as Dr. Hume
- Gunnel Broström as Madame Germaine
- Tammy Newmara as Angelica
- Jan Blomberg as J. D. Younger
- Inga Bedoya as Dixie
- Eve Hossner as Girl in Photograph
