= Les Mains d'Orlac =

1920 French novel by Maurice Renard

- First edition: Nilsson, Paris 1920
- Author: Maurice Renard
- Language: French
- Genre: Science fiction
- Set in: France
- Published: 1920 (Serialized Publication)
- Publisher: L'Intransigeant
- Publication date: May 15—July 12, 1920 (L'Intransigeant)
- Publication place: France
- English publication date: 1929
- Pages: 248

Les Mains d'Orlac (English: The Hands of Orlac) is a French science fiction novel written by Maurice Renard. The plot involves a celebrated pianist who loses his hands in a train crash and has them surgically replaced with those of an executed murderer. Soon, the transplanted hands assume the personality of their psychopathic donor.

Renard's novel was one of his many science fiction stories he wrote in the early 20th century and was initially published in 58 episodes in L'Intransigeant from May 15, to July 12, 1920. It is among Renard's most popular and most translated novels, and has frequently been translated into films, with the two most popular adaptations being The Hands of Orlac (1924) and Mad Love (1935).

== Plot ==
The pianist Stephen Orlac suffers a railway accident that gives him serious head injuries and deprives him of his hands. The famous and controversial transplant doctor Cerral gives him new hands, transplanted from an executed murderer. Afterward, Orlac finds the appendages assuming the personality of the donor.

He seems to suffer from hallucinations and sinks into depression. His wife attempts to save him, but the couple are caught in a spiral of conspiracy, mystery and crime.

== Background ==
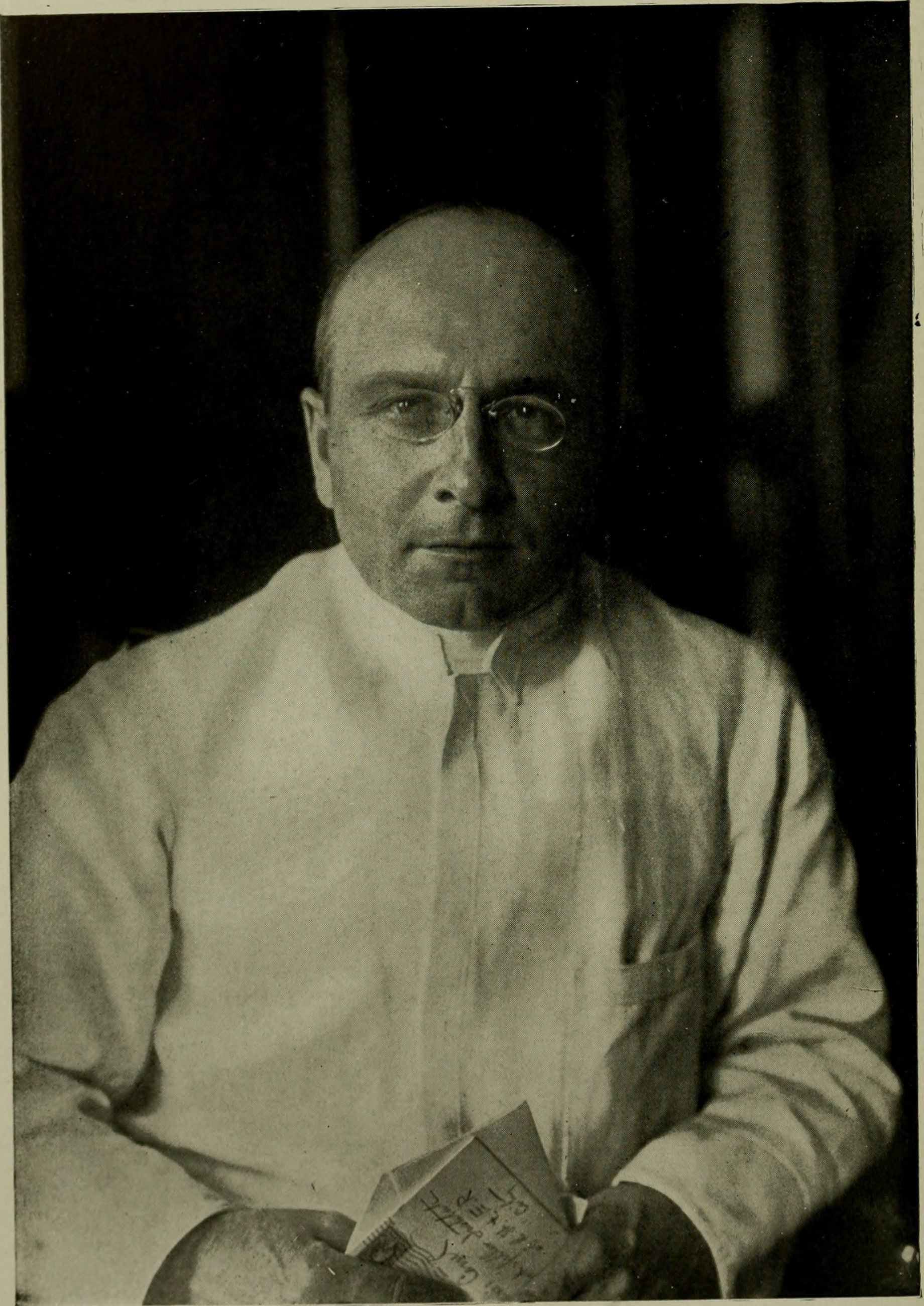
The character Dr. Cerral in the novel was patterned on the French surgeon Alexis Carrel (pictured).

Renard was one of the many French science fiction writers of the early 20th century. In several newspaper and journal essays published from 1909 to 1928, Renard sought to explain and to what he termed le merveilleux scientifique (the scientific marvellous) as a "new literary genre" which he dubbed le roman merveilleux-scientifique (the scientific-marvellous novel.) Renard's first science fiction novel was published in 1908, titled Le Docteur Lerne (Doctor Lerne) which received rave reviews from Paris literary critics.

Arthur B. Evans wrote in Science Fiction Studies that both Le Docteur Lerne and Les Mains d'Orlac reflect Renard's awareness and interest in the scientific advances of the era, specifically within the areas of biology, psychology, and physics which are the focus in the novels. Dr Cerral, the surgeon portrayed in Les Mains d'Orlac was patterned on the French surgeon Alexis Carrel whose experiments with transplants and grafting procedures earned him the Nobel Prize in Physiology or Medicine in 1912.

== Style ==
Evans wrote in Science Fiction Studies that Renard's science fiction tended to challenge our contemporary notions of genre specificity, as his stories continually cross the line into Gothic horror, mythological fantasy, and detective fiction. Evans specifically described Les Mains d'Orlac as science fiction, and "fantasy/horror".

== Publication history ==
Les Mains d'Orlac was first published in 58 episodes in L'Intransigeant from May 15, to July 12, 1920. It was published as a novel France by Nilsson in 1920, followed by Plon in 1933 and Belfond in 1970.

In 1994, Evans wrote that few English translations of Renard's works exist and that among those that were, most were of poor quality and it was still Renard's most popular and most translated novel. It had been translated into German by Norbert Jacques in 1922. An English translation was adapted by Florence Crewe-Jone as The Hands of Orlac and published in 1929 by Dutton.

== Adaptations ==
The Hands of Orlac (1924), a feature-length silent film adaptation of the novel

The novel and its themes have been adapted into films on several occasions. The most famous adaptations are the Austrian film The Hands of Orlac (1924) and Hollywood production Mad Love (1935). A third adaptation was made by Edmond T. Gréville, who made several low-budget pictures in the United Kingdom. His final British production was the horror film The Hands of Orlac (1960) which was simultaneously filmed in French and English.

Renard's original theme of the personality of body parts from a psychopathic donor was later used in other films such as The Beast with Five Fingers (1946), Hands of a Stranger (1963) and Body Parts (1991).
