= Le Docteur Lerne, sous-dieu =

1908 fantasy novel by Maurice Renard

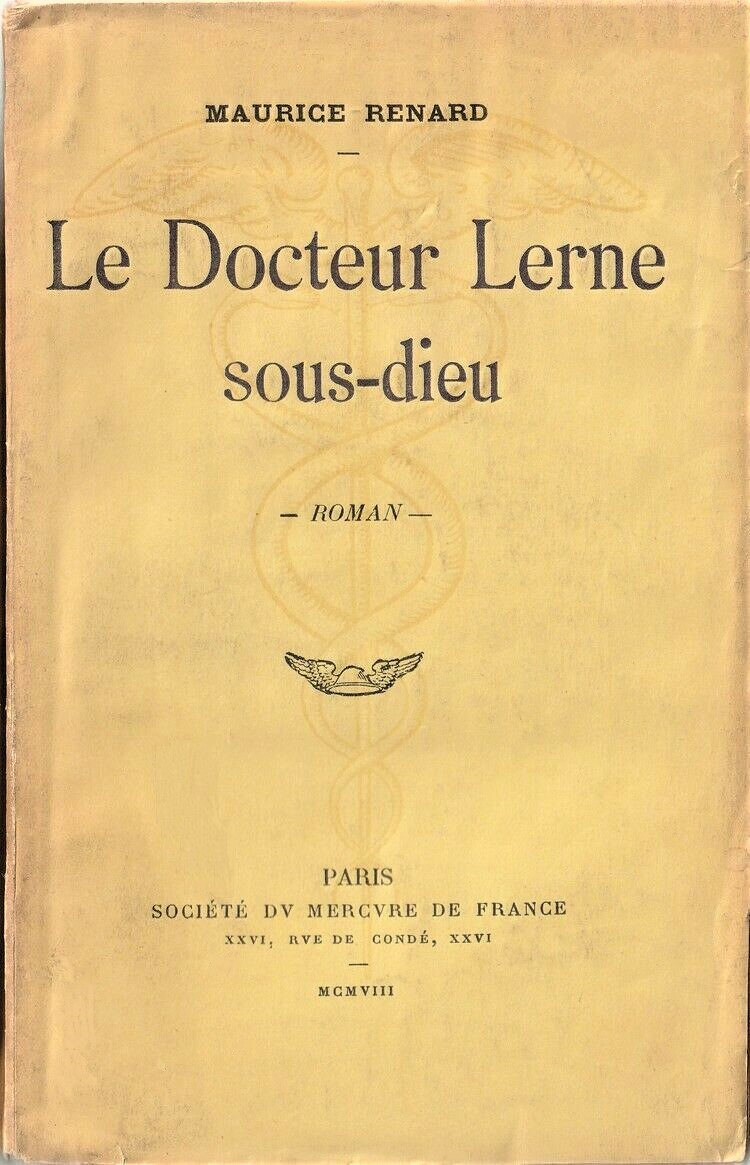
Cover of first edition, published in Mercure de France, 1908.

Le Docteur Lerne, sous-dieu ("Doctor Lerne, Demi-God") is a fantasy novel by the French writer Maurice Renard, published in 1908.

Inspired by The Island of Doctor Moreau by H. G. Wells, Renard adds a significant twist: the narrator himself finds himself the object of a transplant experiment by a mad surgeon, Doctor Lerne. In a preface to the novel, Renard dedicated it to Wells. The book has been translated into numerous languages.

The novel is now in the public domain.

== French publication ==
- Mercure de France, Paris, 1908,
- Editions G. Crès (ill. Joseph Hémard), Paris, 1908.
- Illustrated French edition, Paris, 1919.
- Editions Tallandier, Paris, 1958.
- Belfond Editions, Paris, coll. "Domaine fantastique" No. 3, 1970.
- Marabout, Verviers, coll. "Marabout Fantastique" No. 567, 1976.
- Éditions Robert Laffont, in the collection Maurice Renard, Romans et contes fantastiques, Paris, 1990. ISBN 2-221-05758-9.
- Editions José Corti, Paris, 2010. ISBN 978-2-7143-1026-2.

== English publication ==
An English translation of the book was published in New York by The Macaulay Company in 1923, as New Bodies for Old.

An adaptation by Brian Stableford was published in 2010 under the title Doctor Lerne.

== Television ==
An adaptation by Jean-Daniel Verhaeghe, under the title L'étrange château du docteur Lerne, was broadcast on French television on Antenne 2, on December 28, 1983.
