= The Blue Peril =

1910 novel by Maurice Renard

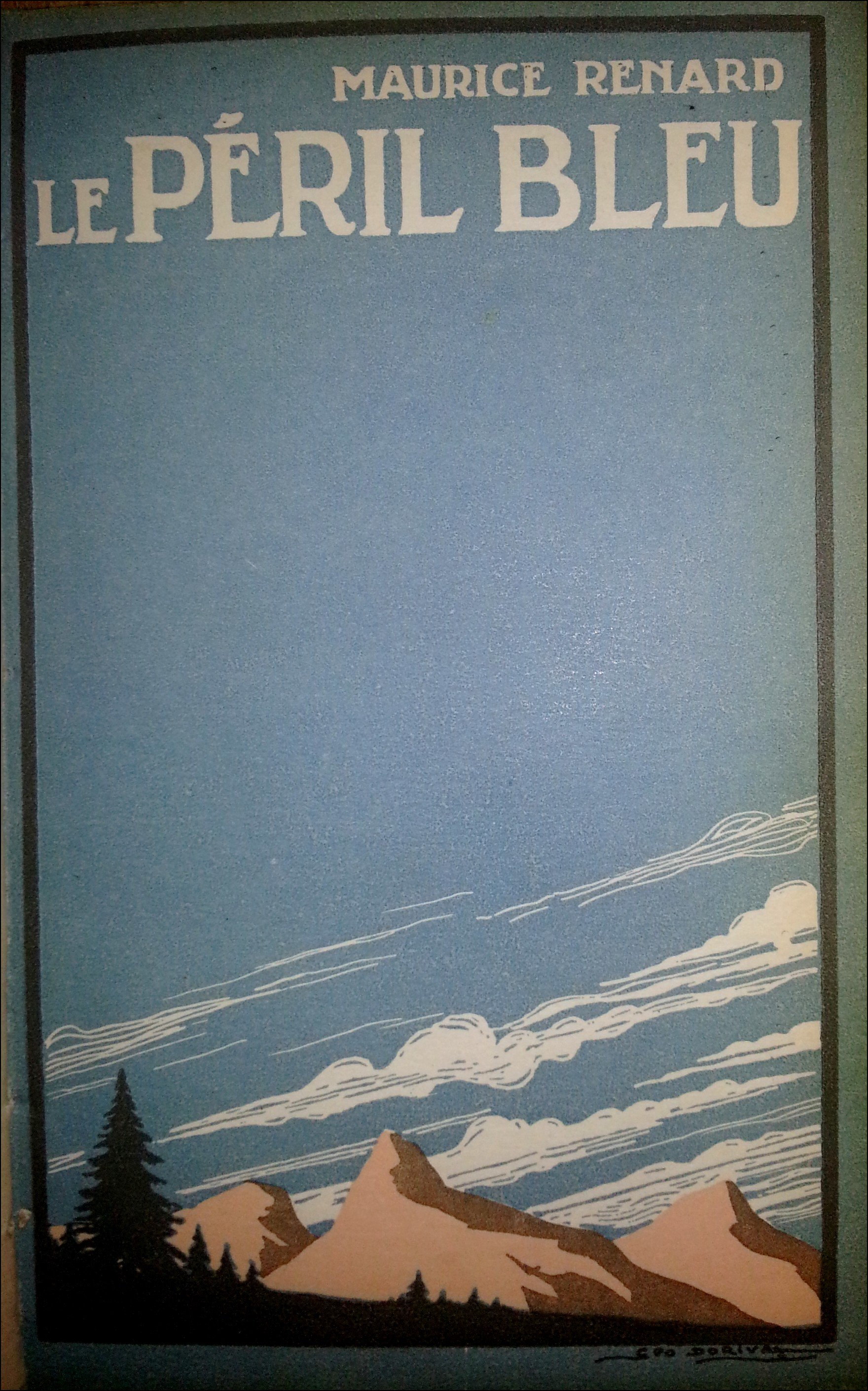
- The Blue Peril
- Author: Maurice Renard
- Original title: Le Péril bleu
- Translator: Brian Stableford
- Language: French
- Genre: Science fiction
- Publisher: L. Michaud
- Publication date: 1910
- Publication place: France
- English publication date: 2010
- OCLC: 29377828

The Blue Peril (English translation of the French title, Le Péril bleu) is a 1910 French science fiction novel by Maurice Renard. It was translated into English by Brian Stableford in 2010, and is considered by many to be Renard's masterpiece, with one critic stating it "still reads as well as when it was originally published." While a science fiction story, it also combines elements of the detective and horror genres. It features invisible sentient creatures living high in Earth's atmosphere who fish for men the way we do fish, and study the specimens they catch.

== Plot ==
The Bugey region of France is a picturesque area in a low series of hills at the tip of the Jura Mountains. Mysteriously, human body parts start to be discovered scattered all over the landscape. Coincidentally, there have been instances of both humans and animals disappearing. Initially, we are led to believe that these are crimes of the natural sort, until it is discovered that they were kidnapped by invisible, ethereal beings, the Sarvants, living 50,000 feet (15,000 m) above the Earth in the upper atmosphere. It turns out that the whole planet is covered by a thin, transparent spherical membrane that covers the atmosphere in the same way that the Earth's crust covers the molten rocks beneath.

Once they have been collected, the humans are dissected, studied and mounted for display in a sort of museum of natural history. Certain bodies are discarded, and thrown "overboard", which is the cause of the body parts which are found scattered across Bugey. This is uncovered through an account found in the pocket of one of the bodies discovered, written by one of those unfortunate enough to have sojourned with Sarvants who managed to write and who chose to kill himself in order to be dumped out of their stratospheric dwelling.

After managing to capture one of the ships of the Sarvants, the French authorities discover that these enigmatic beings do not exist as individual entities, rather they are a race of tiny insectile creatures who are able to assemble and dissemble their bodies with each other in order to form temporary and functional organs controlling their machines.

Eventually, the Sarvants accidentally discover that the specimens they have been acquiring are capable of both suffering and rational thought. This realization leads the Sarvants to cease their experiments.

== Themes ==
The Blue Peril is noteworthy due to its early anti-anthropomorphic treatment of the traditional science fiction theme regarding the possible existence of superior earthly life.

== Influences ==
The Blue Peril may have been the inspiration of other such stories about the Earth being unknowingly occupied by superior aliens, such as Eric Frank Russell's Sinister Barrier (1939).

It was acknowledged as the central idea for John N Raphael's Up Above (1913), as well as borrowing (with permission) some of the details for his story, as was noted on the first page of Raphael's book.

== See also ==
- The Horror of the Heights
- Space animal hypothesis

== Notes ==
In 2010, Le Péril Bleu was translated into English, by Brian Stableford, as part of a five-book translation of Renard's work.
