= Maurice Renard =

French writer (1875–1939)

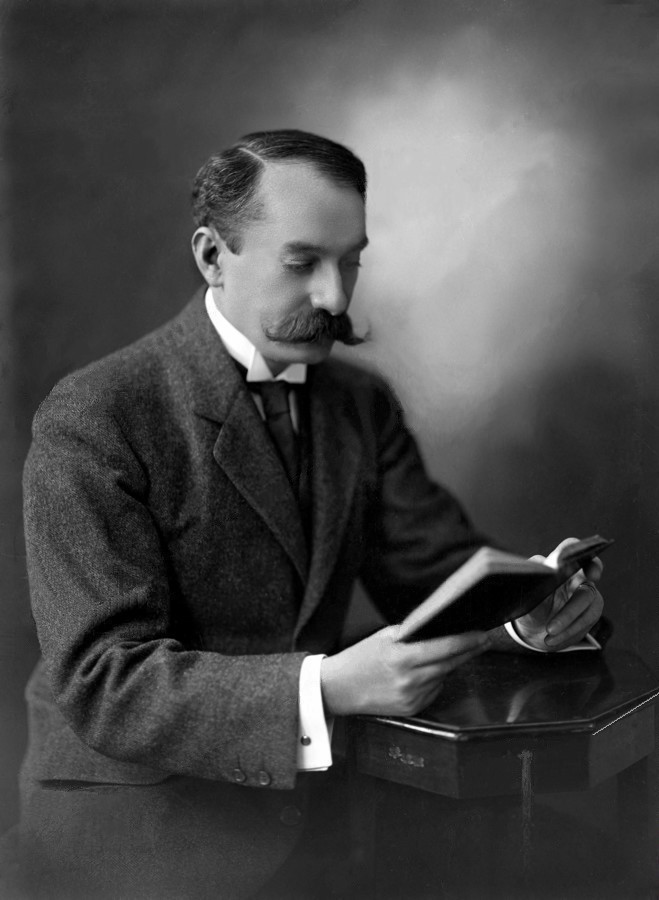
- Maurice Renard photographed by Henri Manuel
- Born: Maurice Renard; 28 February 1875; Châlons-en-Champagne, Marne, France
- Died: 18 November 1939 (aged 64); Rochefort-Sur-Mer, France
- Occupation: Novelist
- Writing career
- Pen name: Vincent Saint-Vincent

Maurice Renard (28 February 1875, Châlons-en-Champagne – 18 November 1939, Rochefort-Sur-Mer) was a French writer.

== Career ==
Renard authored the archetypal mad scientist novel Le Docteur Lerne, sous-dieu [Dr. Lerne - Undergod] (1908), which he dedicated to H. G. Wells. In it, a Doctor Moreau-like mad scientist performs organ transplants not only between men and animals, but also between plants and even machines.

Renard's novel, The Blue Peril (Le Péril Bleu, 1910) postulates the existence of unimaginable, invisible creatures who lived in the upper strata of the atmosphere and fish for men the way men captured fish. These aliens, dubbed "Sarvants" by the human scientists who discover them, feel threatened by our incursions into space the way men would be threatened by an invasion of crabs, and retaliate by capturing men, keeping them in a space zoo and studying them. Eventually, when the Sarvants come to the realization that men are intelligent, they release their captives. Le Péril Bleu predates Charles Fort's Book of the Damned (1919) and retains a humanistic and tolerant rather than fearful and xenophobic philosophy.

Renard wrote the novel Les Mains d'Orlac ("The Hands of Orlac", 1920), in which a virtuoso pianist receives the transplanted hands of a murderer and turns into a killer himself. The book has inspired four film versions as The Hands of Orlac (Orlacs Hände, 1924) with Conrad Veidt, Mad Love (1935) with Colin Clive and Peter Lorre, The Hands of Orlac (1960) with Mel Ferrer and Christopher Lee, and Hands of a Stranger (1962) directed by Newt Arnold.

L'Homme Truqué ("The Phony Man", 1923) features the graft of "electroscopic" eyes onto a man blinded during World War I. The result is the strange description of a world perceived through artificial senses.

L'Homme Qui Voulait Être Invisible ("The Man Who Wanted To Be Invisible", 1923) deals with the issue of invisibility; in it, Renard exposes the scientific fallacy inherent in Wells' famous novel. Since, in order to function, the human eye must perform as an opaque dark room, any truly invisible man would also be blind!

In Le Singe ("The Monkey", 1925), written with Albert-Jean, Renard imagined the creation of artificial lifeforms through the process of "radiogenesis", a sort of human electrocopying or cloning process. The Roman Catholic press ferociously attacked the novel, perceiving it as sacrilegious, and blacklisted by public libraries.

Un Homme chez les Microbes: Scherzo ("A Man Amongst The Microbes: Scherzo", 1928) was one of the first scientific novels on the theme of miniaturization, and one of the earliest to introduce the concept of a micro-world where atoms were microscopic solar systems with planets. Renard's hero submits himself willingly to a shrinking process that eventually ran out of control. As in Richard Matheson's screenplay for The Incredible Shrinking Man (1957), the hero is then attacked by insects, before eventually arriving on an electron-size planet, where scientifically advanced people are able to reverse the process and send him home.

Finally, Le Maître de la Lumière (The Light Master", 1933) anticipated Bob Shaw's "slow glass" by introducing the concept of a glass that condenses time.

== Selected bibliography ==
- Fantômes et Fantôches [Ghosts And Puppets] (As Vincent Saint-Vincent) (1905)
- Le Docteur Lerne, Sous-Dieu [Doctor Lerne, Undergod] (1908) translated by Brian Stableford as Doctor Lerne, 2010, ISBN 978-1-935558-15-6 (previously translated in 1923 as New Bodies For Old, published by The Macaulay Company in New York)
- Le Voyage Immobile [The Motionless Journey] (1909) transl. as The Flight of the Aerofix (1932); translated by Brian Stableford and included in A Man Among the Microbes, 2010, q.v.
- Le Péril Bleu [The Blue Peril] (1912) translated by Brian Stableford as The Blue Peril, 2010, ISBN 978-1-935558-17-0
- M. D'Outremort [Mr. Beyonddeath] (1913) translated by Brian Stableford and included in The Doctored Man, 2010, q.v.
- Les Mains d'Orlac (1920; transl. as The Hands of Orlac, 1929)
- L'Homme Truqué [The Doctored Man] (1921) translated by Brian Stableford as The Doctored Man, 2010, ISBN 978-1-935558-18-7
- L'Homme Qui Voulait Être Invisible [The Man Who Wanted To Be Invisible] (1923) translated by Brian Stableford and included in The Doctored Man, 2010, q.v.
- Le Singe [The Monkey] (With Albert-Jean) (1924; transl. as Blind Circle, 1928)
- L'Invitation à la Peur [The Invitation to Fear] (1926)
- Lui? Histoire d'un Mystère [Him? Tale of a Mystery] (1927) translated by Florence Crewe-Jones.as The Snake of Luvercy (1930)
- Un Homme chez les Microbes: Scherzo [A Man Amongst The Microbes: Scherzo] (written 1908, pub. 1928) translated by Brian Stableford as A Man Among the Microbes, 2010, ISBN 978-1-935558-16-3
- Le Carnaval du Mystère [The Merry-Go-Round of Mystery] (1929)
- La Jeune Fille du Yacht [The Young Girl From The Yacht] (1930)
- Celui Qui n'a pas Tué [He Who Did Not Kill] (1932)
- Le Maître de la Lumière [The Light Master] (1933) translated by Brian Stableford as The Master of Light, 2010, ISBN 978-1-935558-19-4

== See also ==
- L'Homme truqué
- Scientific Marvelous
