= The Hands of Orlac (1960 film) =

British horror film by Edmond T. Gréville

- British quad poster
- Directed by: Edmond T. Gréville
- Written by: Edmond T. Gréville; Donald Taylor; John V. Baines
- Screenplay by: John Baines; Edmond T. Gréville
- Based on: Les Mains d'Orlac by Maurice Renard
- Produced by: Steven Pallos; Donald Taylor
- Starring: Mel Ferrer; Christopher Lee; Dany Carrel; Lucile Saint-Simon
- Cinematography: Desmond Dickinson
- Edited by: Oswald Hafenrichter
- Music by: Claude Bolling
- Distributed by: British Lion Films (United Kingdom); CFDC (France)
- Release dates: December 1960 (United Kingdom); 12 April 1961 (France)
- Running time: 95 minutes
- Countries: United Kingdom; France

The Hands of Orlac (also known as Les Mains D'orlac) is a 1960 horror film directed by Edmond T. Gréville, starring Mel Ferrer, Christopher Lee and Dany Carrel. It was written by Gréville, John V. Baines with additional dialogue by Donald Taylor. It was based on the 1920 novel Les Mains d'Orlac by Maurice Renard, which had previously adapted into silent film and as a Hollywood film production.

Gréville shot the film in both English and French-language versions during production.

== Plot ==
The renowned pianist Stephen Orlac is injured in an aeroplane crash, and he believes his badly damaged hands have been replaced with those of a strangler.

== Cast ==
- Mel Ferrer as Stephen Orlac
- Christopher Lee as Nero (French version: Néron)
- Dany Carrel as Li-Lang
- Lucile Saint-Simon as Louise Orlac
- Felix Aylmer as Dr. Francis Cochrane
- Peter Reynolds as Felix
- Basil Sydney as Maurice Seidelman
- Campbell Singer as Inspector Henderson
- Donald Wolfit as Professor Volcheff
- Donald Pleasence as Graham Coates
- Yanilou as Émilie (Louise's maid)
- Peter Bennett as first member
- George Merritt as second member
- Arnold Diamond as dresser
- Janina Faye as child
- Gertan Klauber as fairground attendant
- Mireille Perrey as Mme Aliberti
- David Peel as pilot
- Walter Randall as waiter
- Anita Sharp-Bolster as Volcheff's assistant

== Production ==
The Hands of Orlac was based on the science fiction novel Les Mains d'Orlac by French author Maurice Renard which was published in France in 1920. The novel is one of Renard's most popular, and was previously adapted into films The Hands of Orlac (1924) and the Hollywood production Mad Love (1935).

Gréville had dual French and British citizenship and directed four British film productions before World War II. Following working on Raoul Walsh's Captain Horatio Hornblower (1951), he began making more commercially-oriented cinema, stating he saw low budget films as "a challenge, that should inspire a director to higher things." The Hands of Orlac was his last British production. Gréville used two film production crews: a French one for the scenes on the French Riviera and a British one for the London backdrops. When filming at the studio, after each scene had been shot in English, a cry of "version française" would be sounded, and the film would be shot again in French.

== Release ==
The Hands of Orlac was released in the United Kingdom in December 1960 and in France on May 16, 1961. The English version's running time is ten minutes shorter than the French-language version.

== Critical reception ==
The Monthly Film Bulletin wrote: "Limping version of Maurice Renard's lurid horror novel, filmed by Robert Wiene in 1924 with Veidt and Krauss, and remade some ten years later by Karl Freund and M-G-M as Peter Lorre's Hollywood début, Colin Clive playing Orlac and Lorre the mad doctor. Updated, shorn of essential suspense and hallucinatory splendour, this shoddy little piece throws away its chances by substituting a moth-eaten magician for the surgeon as its villain, and by casting a chronically stolid actor as Orlac. The dialogue is inept, the mounting and technical credits (the work of an entire French unit for the Riviera scenes, and a British one for the London backdrops) lacklustre. Edmond T. Gréville's direction is banal, featuring as it does that battered old box of tricks – crazed laughter, upside down reflections of embracing couples on piano lids, bizarre masks – which he has been carting around with him for the past 30 years."

Kine Weekly wrote: "Psychopathic poppycock ... The picture, just too silly and transparent for words, quickly dissipate its heart interest, fails to create the slightest suspense, telegraphs every 'thrill' and adds insult to injury by indulging in careless talk."
