= Hands of a Stranger (film) =

1962 film by Newt Arnold

- theatrical release poster
- Directed by: Newt Arnold (as Newton Arnold)
- Screenplay by: Newt Arnold
- Based on: idea from Les Mains d'Orlac; 1920 novel by Maurice Renard
- Produced by: Newt Arnold; Michael Du Pont
- Starring: Paul Lukather; Joan Harvey; James Stapleton
- Cinematography: Henry Cronjager Jr.
- Edited by: Bert Honey
- Music by: Richard LaSalle
- Production company: Glenwood-Neve Productions
- Distributed by: Allied Artists Pictures
- Release date: April 22, 1962 (U.S.)
- Running time: 85 minutes
- Country: United States
- Language: English
- Budget: $168,000

Hands of a Stranger is a 1962 American horror film directed by Newt Arnold and is unofficially the fourth film adaptation of The Hands of Orlac.

== Plot ==
When the hands of pianist Vernon Paris are destroyed in a taxicab accident, he receives a double hand transplant from a recent murder victim. Although lead surgeon Dr. Harding declares the operation a success, Vernon is visibly distressed and seems unable to accept his new hands. Meanwhile, the doctor is questioned by Lieutenant Syms of the police department about the recent murder victim and the apparent secrecy surrounding his operating room.

Feeling sullen and still unable to deal with having someone else's hands, Vernon seeks comfort from his girlfriend, Eileen, but she is unsympathetic. As he reaches out to her, she becomes repelled by his scarred hands, knocking over a candle and setting her dress on fire. As she burns to death, Vernon becomes frozen and does nothing to save her life.

Afterwards, Vernon starts to become even more unstable and goes on a violent rampage. He visits the home of the taxi driver who caused the accident, and after being unable to play the piano for the driver's son, he knocks over and kills the young boy. Next, while at a local fair, Vernon is tortured by images of player pianos and bumper cars, and nearly strangles to death a carnival barker. He then becomes more focused on vengeance, and murders one of the doctors who assisted in the surgery, along with his fiancée.

Finally, after killing another doctor, Vernon retreats to an empty concert hall where his sister and Dr. Harding arrive shortly thereafter. He reveals his latest victim, then begins to manically pound on the piano keys, proving that he will never be able to play the instrument again. He then grabs Dr. Harding and tries to strangle him to death, but is shot and killed by Lt. Syms who arrives at the last minute.

== Cast ==
- Paul Lukather as Dr. Gil Harding
- Joan Harvey as Dina Paris
- James Stapleton as Vernon Paris
- Ted Otis as Dr. Ross Compton
- Michael Rye as George Britton
- Laurence Haddon as Lieutenant Syms
- Elaine Martone as Eileen Hunter
- George Sawaya as Tony Wilder, The Cab Driver
- Michael Du Pont as Dr. Ken Fry
- Sally Kellerman as Sue
- David Kramer as Carnival Barker
- Irish McCalla as Holly
- Barry Gordon as "Skeet" Wilder
