= The Hands of Orlac (1924 film) =

1924 film by Robert Wiene

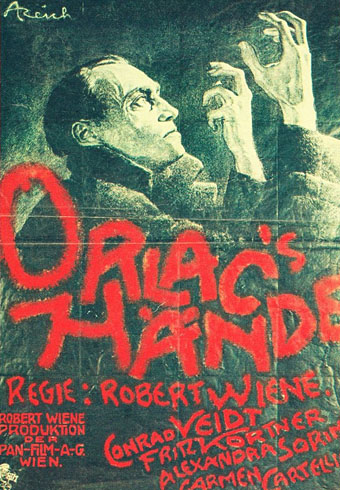
- Directed by: Robert Wiene
- Screenplay by: Louis Nerz
- Based on: Les Mains d'Orlac by Maurice Renard
- Starring: Conrad Veidt; Alexandra Sorina; Fritz Kortner; Carmen Cartellieri; Fritz Strassny; Paul Askonas
- Cinematography: Günther Krampf; Hans Androschin
- Production company: Pan-Film
- Release dates: 24 September 1924 (Berlin); 6 March 1925 (Viena)
- Country: Austria
- Language: German (intertitles)

The Hands of Orlac (German: Orlac's Hände) is a 1924 Austrian silent film directed by Robert Wiene and starring Conrad Veidt, Alexandra Sorina and Fritz Kortner. It is based on the novel Les Mains d'Orlac by Maurice Renard.

== Plot ==
The Hands of Orlac (1924)

Concert pianist Paul Orlac loses his hands in a horrible railway accident. His wife Yvonne pleads with a surgeon to try and save Orlac's hands. The surgeon transplants the hands of a recently executed murderer named Vasseur. When Orlac learns this, horror obsesses him. He is tortured by the presence of a knife he finds at his house, just like that used by Vasseur, and the desire to kill. He believes that along with the hands he has acquired the murderer's predisposition to violence. He confronts the surgeon, telling him to remove the hands, but the surgeon tries to convince him that a person's acts are not governed by hands but by the head and heart.

Orlac's new hands are unable to play the piano, and in time he and his wife run out of money. Creditors give them one more day to pay their bills. Yvonne goes to Paul's father for money, but she is refused. Orlac himself then goes to see his father, but finds he has been stabbed to death with the same knife like Vasseur's. He starts to think he himself committed the murder and goes to a café for a drink. There he meets a man who claims he is Vasseur. The man tells Orlac that the assistant of the surgeon who did the hand transplant reattached his – Vasseur's – head to his body. As proof, he shows Orlac what looks to be a scar on his neck from the surgery. The man then tells Orlac he wants money to keep quiet about the murder.

In the meantime, police find Vasseur's fingerprints at the scene of the crime, causing confusion. Paul and Yvonne Orlac go to the police and try to explain that while Vasseur's hands are on Paul's arms and may have caused the death of his father, Paul has no recollection of killing him. He also tells the police about the man claiming to be the executed murderer and the blackmail money. It turns out that the man is actually a con man named Nera who is well known to police. Orlac's maid tells the police that Nera was a friend of Vasseur and that he made a set of rubber gloves with Vasseur's fingerprints. The gloves were used during the murders. They all conclude that Vasseur was innocent of the murder he was convicted of, which means that Orlac's new hands are the hands of an innocent rather than a murderer.

== Cast ==
- Conrad Veidt as Paul Orlac
- Alexandra Sorina as Yvonne Orlac
- Fritz Kortner as Nera
- Carmen Cartellieri as Regine
- Hans Homma as Dr. Serra
- Fritz Strassny as Paul's father
- Paul Askonas as Servant

== Style ==
Film historian Lotte Eisner said the film was part of the German expressionist cinema movement, while critic Tony Rayns argued it did not belong in that category. Rayns wrote in Sight & Sound that the film belonged closer to the wave of pulp-thrillers such as those by Louis Feuillade or Fritz Lang's Dr. Mabuse films.

== Production ==
The Hands of Orlac was based on Maurice Renard's novel Les Mains d'Orlac which had been translated into German by Norbert Jacques in 1922.

The Hands of Orlac was produced by the Austrian Pan-Film company in association with the German distribution company Berolina Film (Note: Not identical with the German post-war era company of the same name.) and shot at the studios of Listo Film in Vienna. The sets were constructed by the film architects and set builders Stefan Wessely, Hans Rouc, and Karl Exner.

== Release ==
The film premiered in Berlin, Germany, on 24 September 1924. The regular cinema release followed in early 1925, on 31 January in Berlin and on 6 March in Vienna. Distribution was carried out by Berolina Film. The French version had the title Les Mains d'Orlac, the English version The Hands of Orlac. The film was first shown in the United States in 1928, where its promotion and distribution were undertaken by the Aywon Film Corporation.

== Reception ==
Contemporary film critics in Germany praised the film, specifically noting Wiene's mise-en-scène, Nerz's script, and the acting of Conrad Veidt, Fritz Kortner, and Alexandra Sorina. A review in Film-Kurier specifically spoke about Wiene's direction, stating that "that one has found the right director for the rendering of the mysterious psychology and the suspense-laden story of this film. The enigma of man's fate is a subject that Robert Wiene knows how to deal with." A review in Deutsche Allgemeine Zeitung stated that Wiene was on par with other directors of the era such as Ernst Lubitsch, Fritz Lang, F. W. Murnau and Karl Grune and that he had the actors work well together that was last best seen in Husbands or Lovers (1924).

Variety wrote "[W]ere it not for Veidt's masterly characterization, The Hands of Orlac would be an absurd fantasy in the old-time mystery-thriller class"; and The New York Times opined "Although it is raw, hardly the sort of thing some people want to look at after the evening demi-tasse or just before retiring. The Hands of Orlacc, [sic] an old German production now at the Greenwich Village Theatre, is not without merit."

Following World War II, retrospective reception of the film has varied. Reviews of the film by Siegfried Kracauer and Lotte Eisner only gave the film brief mentions in their overview of cinema of the era.

On Rotten Tomatoes, the film has an approval rating 91% based on reviews from 11 critics, with an average rating of 7.8/10.

== Censor's decisions ==
The film was approved for German release on 25 September 1924, but for adults only. An application was made by the Ministry of the Interior of Saxony dated 10 January 1925, urging that the film should be censored, because it "is likely to endanger public safety and order [...] Based on an assessment by the Provincial Criminal Office at Dresden the Government of Saxony does not think it appropriate to make publicly known the internal arrangements and tools of the criminal police, particularly in connection with the taking of finger prints, as this would make the fighting of crime more difficult. Further, the representation of means which enable the criminal to obliterate his prints and deceive the police, is highly unsuitable."

The application for censorship was refused by the Higher Inspectorate, as an expert from the police headquarters in Berlin, when questioned by them about it, described the specialist content as unrealistic. There were so far no experiences across the whole of Europe of the falsification of finger prints by the use of wax impressions or similar techniques, leaving aside any other methods of falsifying prints. The Inspectorate did concede that if the film had shown a realistic method of forging fingerprints, if any existed, then it would have raised issues of public security, but concluded that what was shown in the film was pure fantasy.

== See also ==
Renard's novel was also adapted as

- Mad Love (USA 1935, dir. Karl Freund)
- The Hands of Orlac (GB/FR 1960, dir. Edmond T. Gréville)
