= Popular novel in France =

Literary productions developed in 19th century France

The popular novel—or popular literature, also known as paraliterature—refers to literary productions that reach a wide readership, which developed during the 19th century primarily due to the decrease in printing costs, the emergence of the first press groups, and literacy. This genre is originally concurrent with the Industrial Revolution and a sociology of reading, which practice could only democratize with the appearance of leisure time in a context of progressive urbanization.

These terms encompass works of great variety: detective, adventure, historical, regional, romance novels, etc. The common denominator is to present a story in a simple chronological order, with well-identified characters, archetypes, and where the plot takes precedence over stylistic considerations. Morality is sometimes imbued with good feelings, "common sense", or even Manichaeism; other times, it is reversed, with great naturalistic effects, positioning readers facing notions of fair and unfair.

The works of Eugène Sue, Alexandre Dumas, and Georges Simenon, among others, rank among the greatest successes of the popular novel, in terms of their posterity.

Not exclusively French, the notion of this genre is found among Anglo-Saxons in the British penny dreadful and the American dime novel, expressions equivalent to that of "two [or four] penny novel".

Long scorned by academia but prized as collectibles, the popular novel constitutes a subculture, an aspect of popular culture and the history of books. Its study was initiated by pioneers such as Richard Hoggart, founder of the Centre for Contemporary Cultural Studies (1964), Michel Ragon (Histoire de la littérature prolétarienne en France, 1974), as well as Roger Chartier, Marc Angenot, and Rosalind Krauss. Nowadays, it attracts a significant number of researchers and enthusiasts, while its production experiences sustained growth.

== History ==
=== Origins and myth ===
The popular novel follows the tradition of oral literature from which it borrowed themes and narrative techniques. The first popular novelist (or "storyteller") is undoubtedly Scheherazade, who, in The Thousand and One Nights, to pique Shahryar's interest, is required to resume the thread of her story daily, consisting of a series of interconnected adventures. From a more historiographical perspective, the Bibliothèque bleue is a collection of small, disparate booklets often illustrated with wood engravings, whose dissemination was ensured, in rural France, from the early 17th century until the mid-19th century, by peddlers—other similar collections flourished at the same time across Europe. One of the earliest inventors of the "formula" of the French popular novel seems to be the writer François Guillaume Ducray-Duminil with works such as Les Veillées de ma grand-mère (1799) or Tableau d'une bonne famille (1804), although they remained expensive to purchase.

Various occurrences of the expression "popular novel" appeared before 1836, the birth date of the feuilleton novel. In September 1839, in the Revue des deux Mondes, Sainte-Beuve criticized what he then called "industrial literature". The expression "popular novelist" is said to have first appeared in 1843 in the socialist press to praise Eugène Sue, author of The Mysteries of Paris (1842–1843). The term refers to the author of literature intended for the people—for the masses, as his detractors would soon say. Other authors, who were unaware of being "popular", preceded Sue, such as Paul de Kock, Auguste Ricard, or Marie Aycard.

Emerging from the July Monarchy, this literary form, also called feuilleton-novel and then serial novel, developed during the Second French Empire and, especially, the French Third Republic. During 1835–1845, the price of a single-volume novel decreased, dropping from 3 to 1 franc, thanks to Gervais Charpentier, Michel Lévy Frères, among others.

The "popular novel" expression is regularly used only from the French Second Republic, with the creation of the Romans illustrés (Illustrated Novels) collection by Gustave Havard in 1848; and, in 1849, with the creation of the Romans populaires illustrés (Illustrated Popular Novels) collection by the publisher Gustave-Émile Barba and his father. However, as early as 1841–1845, novels sold at 20 centimes each began to appear. They were called "four-penny novels", published by Joseph Bry or Hippolyte Boisgard.

With The Mysteries of Paris, Sue created archetypes that would be extensively reused: the persecuted innocence, and the righter of wrongs. This redeeming hero continued his career in historical novels, with Alexandre Dumas, Paul Féval, and Viscount Alexis de Ponson du Terrail, authors of some of the finest pages of swashbuckling novels. Meanwhile, adventure novels rapidly grew during the Second Empire with authors such as Gustave Aimard or Gabriel Ferry, and later Louis Noir, brother of Victor Noir.

The object definitively democratizes in the 1860s–1880s with a significant decrease in production costs of the press, and thus the unit selling price. Popular novels were everywhere. Some newspapers published up to three serials daily. It was the era when novels of judicial error triumph, dramas of families torn apart by a relentless fate. Emotion was the order of the day. One must make "Margot cry" or be "loved by their concierge" (an expression taken from the title of a novel by Eugène Chavette). The "novel for Margot" was also, for a time, called the "novel of the doorman". The period also saw the emergence of detective fiction, fantastical and scientific genre novels, precursors to science fiction, and soon, espionage novels.

The wild fictions of the first popular novels were gradually giving way to a less epic social realism, closer to melodrama.

=== 1880–1900: First golden age ===
==== Peak of novels featuring victims ====
This was the advent of authors such as Xavier de Montépin, whose The Bread Peddler saw numerous reprints, or Jules Mary who wrote Deux Innocents, Roger-la-Honte, La Pocharde, stories in which lost children, orphans, unwed mothers, alcoholics, and innocent convicts abound. At the start in an obscure newspaper, Mary earned eight francs a month. But he progressed quickly: his first novels delivered to Le Moniteur universel brought him a hundred times more. At Le Petit Journal, he was then paid 30000 gold francs annually. He bought himself a mansion on Boulevard Malesherbes. He was made an officer of the Legion of Honor in 1913. Finally, he was paid three francs per line, using an écurie (stable) of ghostwriters who were royally paid thirty centimes a line.

This was also the case for Émile Richebourg who, with Les Deux Berceaux and La Petite Mionne, stages his favorite theme: the abduction or exchange of children, combined with adultery. At the peak of his career, he is said to have earned up to 1.5 million gold francs.

Also noteworthy are Georges Ohnet, author of The Ironmaster, and Pierre Decourcelle, with The Two Kids, whose success was as impressive as short-lived. Under their influence, there was a proliferation of novels featuring victims that depict heroes caught in a fatal spiral of ruthless circumstances. Ideal scapegoats endured a long and painful sentence for crimes they did not commit, awaiting their rehabilitation, a plot that owes much to The Count of Monte Cristo (A. Dumas, 1844). These victim novels, tearful as they may be, also reflected a painful social reality. While sometimes posing as moralizers, novelists also contributed to raising awareness of real social problems: the gradual rehabilitation of the daughter-mother owes much to Jules Mary or Émile Richebourg.

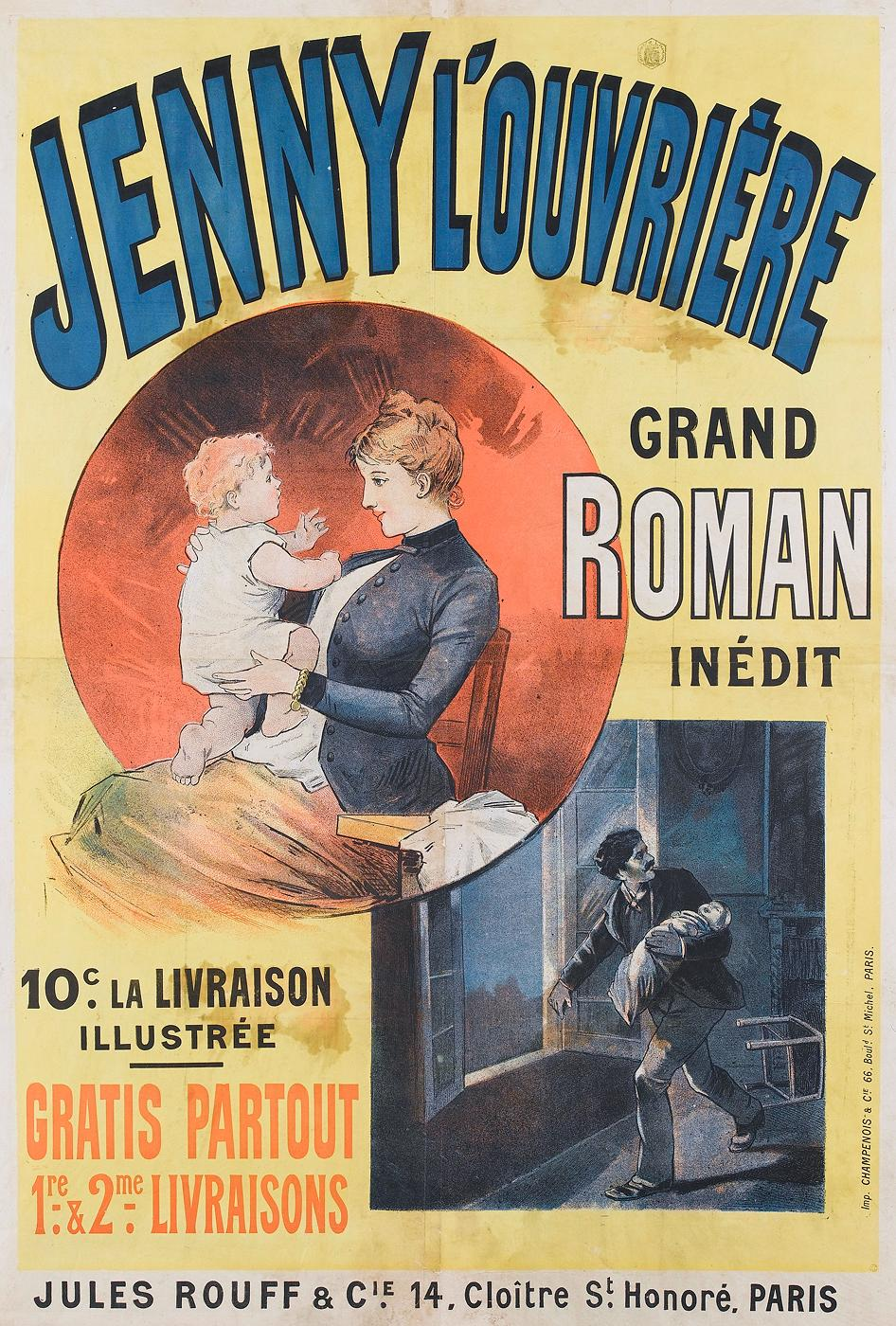
Jenny l'ouvrière, advertising poster for Jules Cardoze's novel, 1890–1891.

The selling price remained a determining factor before 1914. Launching new collections or series was the subject of promotional offers on the first volumes (for example, 15 or 35 centimes instead of the usual 65). Delivered weekly, the illustrated booklets benefit from an exceptional print run for each first issue (500,000 copies) and sometimes free distribution. All publishers emphasized the pagination of their publications (Tallandier: "the volume of 448 pages, appearing on the 25th of each month, 3 fr. 50") and the number of lines ("each volume containing a complete work – 30,000 lines of reading"). Fayard, for example, praised the launch of Chaste et flétrie in its collection Le Livre populaire: "The magisterial work of Charles Mérouvel, the great popular novelist, comprises nearly 800 pages of compact text with 33,700 lines corresponding to 50,000 lines of newspaper with 1,518,000 letters. It was given without missing a word for 65 centimes in the first volume of our series Le Livre populaire. Such effort has never been made in bookselling, both in terms of affordability and the significance of the work provided."

==== Emergence of popular publishers ====
By the turn of the century, enthusiasm was at its peak. So specialized publishers emerged: Jules Rouff, one of the most prolific; Arthème Fayard, who launched Le Livre populaire in 1905; Jules Tallandier (Le Livre national rouge in 1909); Joseph Ferenczi, whose series Le Petit Livre, created in 1912, were sold at 40 centimes each and did not stop until 1964 after more than 2,000 issues. La Maison de la bonne presse inaugurates the Collection des romans populaires at 20 centimes in 1912 with authors such as Pierre l'Ermite, René d'Anjou, and Delly. The era saw the affirmation of genre autonomy (duly identified by publishers) and the sentimental novel triumph. Female literacy has gradually caught up with male literacy. Publishers addressed an expanding audience, with women gradually becoming the main targets. The novel Jenny, l'ouvrière (1890) by Jules Cardoze offered an inside story: the adventures of Jenny, a worker like her readers, through a glorified daily life.

==== Press ====
Newspaper publishers have greatly benefited from the popular novel advent. From the late 1830s until 1920, the original edition of a bookstore book was almost always preceded, accompanied, or followed by publication in episodes in national or regional newspapers. For the press, the period from 1860 to 1920, which saw the triumph of increasingly rapid machines like those of Marinoni, represented a golden age, now gone: now, press messengers founded by pioneers like Louis Hachette offer readers, at newsstands, cheap, stapled, and unbound booklets with illustrated covers, which serve as derivatives. Thus, in 1914, four national newspapers had circulations of over one million copies, competing for this market: Le Matin, Le Petit Parisien (1,450,000 copies), Le Petit Journal (a symbol and precursor of popular mass-circulation press that appeared in 1863), and Le Journal. These titles accompany their launches with extensive advertising campaigns.

These newspapers provided a great deal of space to sensational news, a theme favored by popular novelists, who often followed criminal cases as journalists, such as Gaston Leroux, a trained lawyer who spent his entire career at Le Matin, first as a journalist and then as a senior reporter (from 1894 to 1908) and finally as a feuilletonist until 1927. Gustave Le Rouge, head of service at Le Petit Parisien, was dismissed for inventing a sensational news story. Jules Mary wrote Le Boucher de Meudon based on the memoirs of Pranzini, the butcher murderer.

The union of the press and the popular novel was primarily an economic success. In 1865, Le Petit Journal increased its circulation to 282,060 copies at the time of the insertion of La Résurrection de Rocambole. In 1867, Le Dernier Mot de Rocambole forced the circulation of La Petite Presse to 100,000 copies on the first day alone. Émile Richebourg accepted the publication of Les Deux Berceaux in La Petite République, which saved Gambetta from ruin, as his newspaper was dying due to lack of readers.

Pierre Decourcelle, a millionaire writer, was at that time a true best-selling industrialist who accumulated successes, for which he mobilized a significant number of ghostwriters, akin to Dumas in his time, but up to sixty individuals. Not content with being published in serial form, this astute novelist had his works published, adapted them for the stage, and then for cinema by creating his own film company in 1908, the Société cinématographique des auteurs et gens de lettres.

=== 1914–1940: Relative decline ===
However, after 1920, French readers seemed saturated and paid less and less attention to serials, soon surpassed by radio and film series. Furthermore, with the First World War, the press had entered a war economy fueled by images: the media landscape of the post-war period had to adapt.

It was during this time that publishers of classic literature or bookstores also began producing popular novels: while Hachette acquired stakes in many structures such as Fayard or Ferenczi through its distribution networks, Gallimard started producing detective or mystery novels. A major popular publisher of the time, Pierre Lafitte, eventually sold his highly profitable group to Hachette. The consequences of the Great Depression only amplified this phenomenon.

=== 1945–present: Mixing genres ===
After the war, while a crisis hit paper suppliers amid stock shortages, popular novels rose from their ashes in other forms, with genre novels (science fiction, adventure, detective, espionage, romance, etc.) in a pocket format that continues to ensure its success. The specificity of popular literature tended to fade. New genres fluctuated between the status of popular literature and the recognition of a more literate audience. Detective novels or science fiction thus demonstrated great vitality, winning over a much more diverse audience than the one targeted by publishers like Rouff or Tallandier. The Série Noire collection quickly earned its stripes. The San Antonio series defied classification altogether, while novels by Albert Simonin (Touchez pas au grisbi!, 1953; Le cave se rebiffe, 1954; Grisbi or not grisbi, 1955) were as much exercises in cant style as they were detective plots.

The war or espionage novel was mainly exemplified by the immense success of Gérard de Villiers' series, SAS, with an ideology marked by racism and misogyny.

The Canadian publisher Harlequin established itself as a global leader, offering successful American texts translated into French as well as other languages.

Comics gradually moved away from the children's section where they were long confined, especially from the 1970s onwards, to capture a wider audience, with constantly renewed forms (stories, layouts, themes).

Children's literature experienced strong growth. In addition to reissues of 19th-century authors (Paul d'Ivoi, Jules Verne, etc), new successful texts emerged, such as The Famous Five by Enid Blyton, or Fantômette (a feminine tribute to Fantômas) by Georges Chaulet.

=== Legacy ===
While Balzac or Stendhal are now globally recognized authors, a large part of the successful authors of the XIX^{e} century were, so to speak, forgotten. The works of Richebourg or Ohnet, so famous in their time, were hardly read except by academic researchers. Except for a few authors few authors, reprints were rare. However, some popular novels continued to be the subject of numerous adaptations, in cinema and television, where they could boast of renewed success.

==== Screen adaptations ====
If we limit ourselves to the field of French-language literature, Arsène Lupin was adapted several times for cinema (by Jacques Becker notably) before becoming a television series in Quebec (Arsène Lupin, 1960), and then being portrayed by Georges Descrières in a new television series (1971–1974). The same applies to the series Chéri-Bibi (1974) based on Gaston Leroux's work and the multiple adaptations of The Mysteries of Paris by Eugène Sue. Several films by André Hunebelle are dedicated to Fantômas, portrayed by Jean Marais, opposite Louis de Funès as Juve. The adaptations of The Three Musketeers are too numerous to count, perpetuating the popularity of the swashbuckling novel on screen, as are the films or series based on Paul Féval's The Hunchback (Lagardère, TV series by Jean-Pierre Decourt, 1967) and, to a lesser extent, Michel Zévaco's Pardaillan.

==== Publishing ====
As early as the 1910s, authors such as Paul Féval, Maurice Leblanc, pocket-sized book format sold for between 20 and 30 cents each.

Alexandre Dumas was the first popular novelist to receive the honor of a critical edition in the Bibliothèque de la Pléiade (1962). Georges Simenon joined him there in 2003. With the Bouquins collection, Francis Lacassin gradually reissued numerous popular novels, accompanied by very detailed notes. The success of a movie or TV series often prompts a reissue.

== Key dates ==
- 1843: The Mysteries of Paris becomes a social phenomenon. The Journal des débats, which publishes the serial exclusively, is in high demand, and riots break out at the doors of reading rooms that rent the journal to modest budgets. In the Chamber of Deputies, indignant debates denounce the decadence and the amoral nature of Eugène Sue's work, while he receives thousands of letters testifying to a certain confusion between fiction and reality. Some readers even send money for Fleur de Marie, while others seek help or protection from Rodolphe, the all-powerful benefactor of the poor. Eugène Sue quickly finds himself at the head of a colossal fortune. Le Constitutionnel buys the right to publish The Wandering Jew for the trifling sum of 100,000 francs.
- 1857: Paul Féval publishes The Hunchback in Le Siècle.
- 1883: Publication of Treasure Island by Robert Louis Stevenson.
- 1884: Publication of The Bread Peddler by Xavier de Montépin.
- 1895: Publication at Rouff of the epic novel by Adolphe d'Ennery (1811–1899) and Eugène Cormon (1811–1903): The Two Orphans, of which D.W. Griffith signs the first adaptation to the screen in 1921, with Lillian Gish.
- 1896: Publication of L'Invasion noire by Commander Émile Driant alias Captain Danrit. This 1200-page novel was a big success and would be quickly followed in 1905 by L'Invasion jaune which enjoyed the same success.
- 1911: First appearance of Fantômas, which was an immediate success. The first volume released on February 15, 1911, is printed in hundreds of thousands of copies. A further 31 monthly volumes... followed.

== Genres ==
- Adventure novel is subdivided into several sub-genres: historical novels (Alexandre Dumas, Paul Féval, Michel Zévaco, etc), anticipation novels, and Westerns. Many adventure novels depict journeys around the world, following the path laid out by Jules Verne, such as Paul d'Ivoi or Jean de La Hire. As the adventure novel is illustrated in the conquest of virgin territories, it sometimes echoes European colonization policies, as exemplified by Louis-Henri Boussenard or Captain Danrit. Several authors like Gabriel Ferry or Gustave Aimard followed the path laid out by James Fenimore Cooper to write adventure novels of the Western type, primarily set in the United States.
- The detective novel originates from both adventure novels and novels of manners. It initially revolves around the rehabilitation of victims of judicial errors and gradually shifts towards solving police mysteries. It is first illustrated by Émile Gaboriau, and then by others, less known today than their characters: Maurice Leblanc is overshadowed by the famous Arsène Lupin; Gaston Leroux is the father of Joseph Rouletabille and Chéri-Bibi; while the names of Pierre Souvestre and Marcel Allain are completely ignored to the great benefit of Fantômas.
- Anticipation and science fiction are related to the terrifying, strange, and pseudo-scientific novels that anticipate the future illustrated science fiction novel, immortalized by Jules Verne. This genre is sometimes called scientific romance. In 1892, Jules Lermina's Le Secret des Zippélius was published and serialized since 1889. In 1891, H.G. Wells caused a sensation with The Time Machine. Then came Gustave Le Rouge (Le Prisonnier de la planète Mars), Jean de La Hire (La Roue fulgurante), or Alfred Assollant. The fantasy novel is illustrated by Maurice Renard, author of the fascinating Les Mains d'Orlac.
- From Revenge to Espionage: The roman revanchard, soon to be the war novel, gains a certain autonomy in the form of espionage novels, directly imported from across the Channel. L'Homme du gaz by Paul Féval is one of these pioneering works fitting into a historical perspective. Spies infest even the sentimental novel. As an avatar of this martial vein, the comedic soldier has his moment of glory. World War I will intertwine all these themes.
- The sentimental novel has multiple origins: melodrama, judicial error novels, social realism, etc. From 1920 onwards, it entered its psychological era, first illustrated by Delly and Max du Veuzit, then by Guy des Cars. After the war, Barbara Cartland appeared. This is followed by the genre industrialization, with publishers of global dimensions, such as Harlequin (world leader).

== Selected authors ==
List of authors of popular novels (period 1836–1918) featured in Michel Nathan's anthology:

- Jules Beaujoint (1830–1892)
- Adolphe Belot (1829–1890)
- Paul Bertnay (1846–1928)
- Jules Boulabert (1830–1887)
- Alexis Bouvier (1836–1892)
- Paul Bru (1858–1929)
- Paul d'Ivoi (1856–1915)
- Émile Driant (1855–1916)
- Jules Verne (1828–1905)
- Jean Bruno (1821–1899, Jean Vaucheret)
- Eugène Chavette (1827–1902)
- Adolphe d'Ennery (1811–1899)
- Pierre Decourcelle (1856–1926)
- Jean-Louis Dubut de Laforest (1853–1902)
- Marie Émery (1816–1889)
- Paul Féval (1817–1887)
- Zénaïde Fleuriot (1829–1890)
- Hector France (1840–1908)
- Roger Des Fourniels (1851–1924)
- Marie-Louise Gagneur (1832–1902)
- Benjamin Gastineau (1823–1904)
- Étienne Gervais (Just-Jean-Étienne Roy)
- Jean Grange (1827–1892)
- Henri Kéroul (1857–1921)
- Paul de Kock (1793–1871)
- Pierre-Alexandre Bessot de Lamothe (Alexandre de Lamothe, 1824–1897)
- Maurice Landay (1873–1931)
- Gaston Leroux (1868–1927)
- Daniel Lesueur, pseudonyme de Jeanne Loiseau (1854–1921)
- André de Lorde (1869–1942)
- Jules Mary (1851–1922)
- Arthur Matthey, pseudonyme d'Arthur Arnould (1833–1895)
- Charles Mérouvel (1832–1920)
- Louise Michel (1833–1905)
- Victorine Monniot (1825–1880)
- Xavier de Montépin (1829–1902)
- Eugène Morel (1869–1934)
- Michel Morphy (1863–1928)
- Raoul de Navery (1834–1885)
- Georges Ohnet (1848–1918)
- Stéphanie Ory, alias Jean-Just Roy
- François Oswald (?–1894)
- Pierre Alexis de Ponson du Terrail (1829–1871)
- René de Pont-Jest (1830–1904)
- Félix Pyat (1810–1889)
- Émile Richebourg (1833–1898)
- Jean-Just Roy (1794–1871)
- Pierre de Sales (1854–1914)
- Alfred Sirven (1830–1904)
- Frédéric Soulié (1800–1847)
- Eugène Sue (1804–1857)
- Léo Taxil (1854–1907), alias Gabriel-Antoine Jogand-Pagès)
- Louis-Adolphe Turpin de Sansay (1832–1891)
- Paul Verdun (1861–1936), alias Gustave Marchand
- Charles De Vitis (1848–?)
- Pierre Zaccone (1817–1895)
- Michel Zévaco (1860–1918)

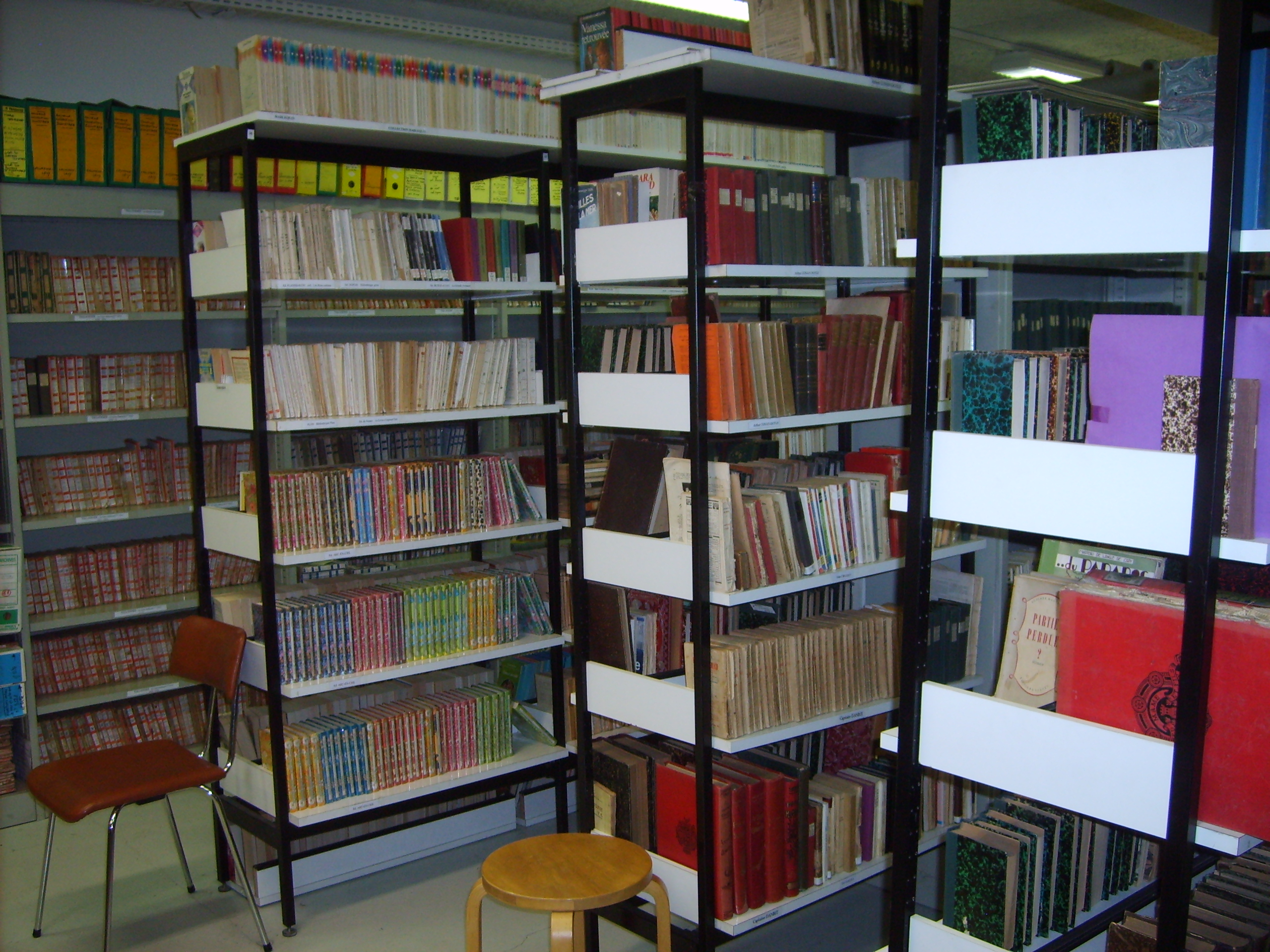
Shelves at the Bibliothèque européenne du roman populaire in Laxou.

== Common expressions ==
French borrows many everyday terms from popular literature, such as:

- Rocambole, the hero created by Ponson du Terrail, gave his surname to the adjective rocambolesque.
- When Amédée Achard wrote La Cape et l'épée in 1875, he generalized an expression coined by Ponson du Terrail, giving the generic name to a genre whose plot mainly takes place between the XV and XVIII centuries.
- We sometimes get annoyed when we come across a Zigomar, without suspecting that he is a character by Léon Sazie.

== Bibliography ==
- Artiaga, Loïc (dir.) (2008). "Le roman populaire : des premiers feuilletons aux adaptations télévisuelles, 1836–1960". Autrement (in French). Mémoires: culture (143). Paris: 186. ISBN 978-2-7467-1200-3.
- Angenot, Marc (1975). "Le roman populaire: recherches en paralittérature". Presses de l'Université du Québec (in French). Genres et discours (1). Montreal: X-145. ISBN 0-7770-0119-5.
- Moritz, Bassler (2002). "Der deutsche Pop-Roman. Die neuen Archivisten" [(Le pop-roman allemand. La nouvelle archiviste)]. C.H. Beck (in German). Munich. ISBN 3406476147.
- Brochon, Pierre (1961). "La littérature populaire et son public". Communications (in French). 1 (1): 70–80. doi:10.3406/comm.1961.918.
- "Collectif". Romantisme. Littérature populaire (53). 1986.
- Compère, Daniel (dir.) (2007). Dictionnaire du roman populaire francophone (in French). Paris: Nouveau Monde. p. 490. ISBN 978-2-84736-269-5.
- Compère, Daniel (2012). Les romans populaires (in French). Vol. Les Fondamentaux de la Sorbonne Nouvelle. Paris: Presses Sorbonne Nouvelle. p. 139. ISBN 978-2-87854-561-6.
- Couégnas, Daniel (1992). Introduction à la paralittérature. Paris: Seuil. p. 200. ISBN 2-02-013555-8.
- Frigerio, Vittorio (2002). Les fils de Monte-Cristo: idéologie du héros de roman populaire. Limoges: Presses universitaires de Limoges (PULIM), coll. Médiatextes. p. 358. ISBN 2-84287-250-9.
- Frigerio, Vittorio (2008). "Bons, Belles et méchants (sans oublier les autres) : le roman populaire et ses héros". In Artiaga (ed.). Le roman populaire : des premiers feuilletons aux adaptations télévisuelles, 1836-1960 (in French). Vol. Mémoires: culture (Loïc ed.). Paris: Autrement. pp. 97–116. ISBN 978-2-7467-1200-3.
- Lacassin, Francis (1991). À la recherche de l'empire caché: mythologie du roman populaire. Paris: Julliard. p. 366. ISBN 2-260-00688-4.
- Migozzi, Jacques (2005). "Littérature(s) populaire(s) : un objet protéiforme". Hermès (in French). 42 (Peuple, populaire et populisme): 93–100. doi:10.4267/2042/8988. Archived from the original on February 23, 2024.
- Liesebrinck, Hans-Jurgen; Lux, York-Gothart; Mollier, Jean-Yves; Sorel, Patrick (dir.) (2003). "Les lectures du peuple en Europe et dans les Amériques (XVIIe-XXe siècle)". Complexe. Brussels.
- Olivier-Martin, Yves (1979). Histoire du roman populaire en France : de 1840 à 1980. Paris: Albin Michel. p. 301. ISBN 2-226-00869-1.
- Nathan, Michel (1985). Anthologie du roman populaire 1836-1918. Paris: UGE 10-18. ISBN 2-264-00677-3.
- Proust, Jean-Marc (1997). Racisme et nationalisme dans le roman populaire français sous la IIIe République (1870-1940) (Thesis).
- Queffélec, Lise (1989). "Le Roman-feuilleton français au XIXe siècle". PUF (in French). coll. « Que sais-je ? » (2466). Paris.
- Ragon, Michel (1986). Histoire de la littérature prolétarienne de langue française : littérature ouvrière, littérature paysanne, littérature d'expression populaire (in French) (1st ed.). Paris: Librairie générale française. ISBN 2-253-11506-1.
- Thiesse, Anne-Marie (1984). Le Roman du quotidien : lecteurs et lectures populaires à la Belle-Époque (in French). Vol. Le Temps et la mémoire. Paris: Le Chemin vert. p. 270. ISBN 2-903533-11-3.
- Reedited version: Thiesse, Anne-Marie (2000). Le Roman du quotidien : lecteurs et lectures populaires à la Belle-Époque (in French). Vol. Points. Paris: Seuil. p. 283. ISBN 2-02-040434-6.
- Eco, Umberto (1976). Il Superuomo di massa [De Superman au Surhomme] (in Italian). Le Livre de Poche, 1983. ISBN 978-2-253-94209-2.

== See also ==
=== External links ===
- Entry in a dictionary or general encyclopedia "Universalis".
- "L'Association des Amis du Roman Populaire". Archived from the original on February 23, 2024.
- "Un forum érudit consacré à la littérature populaire". Archived from the original on December 1, 2023.
- "Un site sur les romans d'aventures" (Rich in information and illustrations). Archived from the original on February 1, 2024.
- "Belphegor" (Academic journal devoted to the study of popular literature and media culture). Archived from the original on 2007-04-07.
- "Analyse de romans populaires et policiers. Dictionnaire de personnages". Archived from the original on 5 June 2012.
