= Le Mystère des XV =

French novel

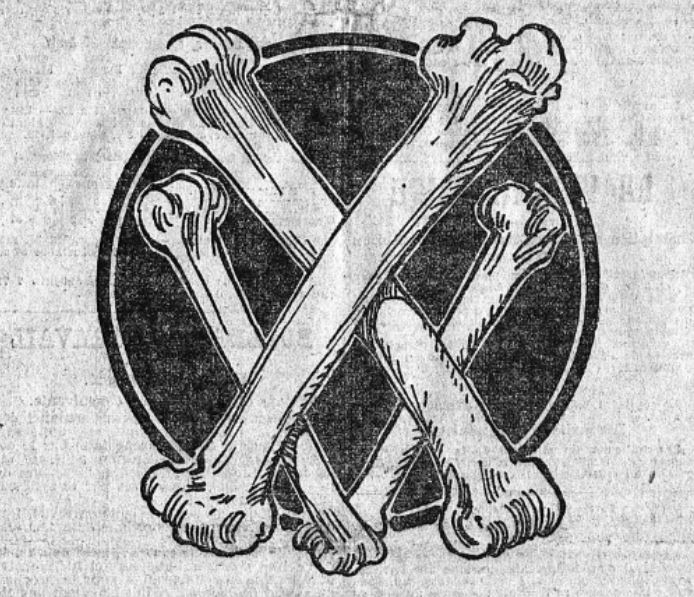
- Advertisement for the novel published in Le Matin on April 21, 1911.
- Author: Jean de La Hire
- Cover artist: Gontran Ranson
- Series: Nyctalope
- Genre: Social science fiction
- Publisher: Ferenczi & fils
- Publication date: 1922 (pre-publication in 1911)
- Publication place: France
- Pages: 192

Le Mystère des XV is a French novel by Jean de La Hire, initially published in serialized form in 1911 in the daily newspaper Le Matin. It was later released in book format in 1922 by Éditions Ferenczy in two volumes titled Le Mystère des XV and Le Triomphe de l’amour. A subsequent edition appeared in 1954 by Éditions Jaeger under the titles Le Secret des XII and Les Conquérants de Mars. Despite the delayed French reissues, the novel was translated into other languages during the first half of the 20th century for publication abroad.

The novel is a sequel to Jean de La Hire’s earlier serialized work L'Homme qui peut vivre dans l'eau ("The Man Who Can Live in Water"), set 25 years later. It introduces the character Léo Sainte-Claire, known as the Nyctalope, and recounts his first adventure. The plot centers on a secret organization called the XV, which abducts fifteen young women in Paris with the intention of transporting them to Mars, a planet it seeks to conquer. The Nyctalope, whose fiancée is among the abductees, pursues the organization, first traveling to the Congo and then to Mars. There, he confronts the organization before becoming involved in a broader conflict with the Martians.

This adventure novel is part of the tradition of European scientific romances from the late 19th and early 20th centuries that take place on Mars. While it includes references to The War of the Worlds by H. G. Wells, Le Mystère des XV introduces several innovations. It is considered the first French novel to depict the colonization of Mars by Earth inhabitants. Additionally, Jean de La Hire presents one of the earliest examples of a superhero in popular literature by attributing the ability of nyctalopia to his protagonist.

== Presentation ==
The novel consists of four parts separated by interludes.

=== Sainte-Claire the Nyctalope ===
In Le Mystère des XV, Xavière de Ciserat is abducted by Koynos, leader of the secret organization the XV, after spending an evening with her fiancé, Léo Sainte-Claire. She is taken via radioplane (Note: Aeroplane invented by the XV, which enables the traversal of interplanetary space using Hertzian waves.) to Mars, where Koynos expresses his affection and desire for her to join him in conquering the planet. (Note: La Hire 1911, First part: I)

On Mars, Xavière learns that other young women, including her sister Yvonne, have also been abducted. Koynos operates under Oxus, who previously threatened Earth with the Hictaner (Note: These events are recounted in Jean de La Hire’s novel L’Homme qui peut vivre dans l’eau, published in the newspaper Le Matin between July and September 1909.) twenty-five years earlier and now orders Koynos to return to Earth for a final mission.

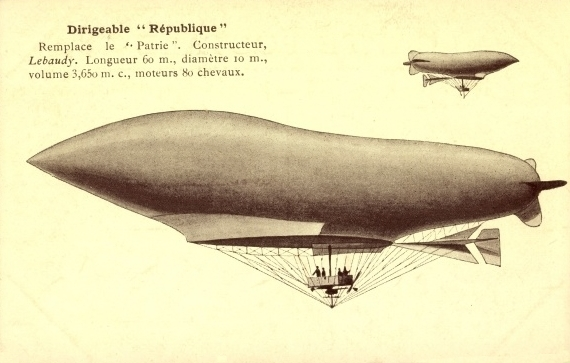
The airship La République (1908-1909), the model used by Léo Sainte-Claire for his flight from Paris to Brazzaville.

In Le Mystère des XV, Léo Saint-Claire, known as the Nyctalope, investigates the abduction of his fiancée, Xavière de Ciserat, and identifies the kidnappers’ base in the Congo. He organizes an expedition with Louis de Ciserat, the Minister of the Navy, and five companions. (Note: La Hire 1911, First part: II) During their airship journey to Africa, Koynos, a member of the XV, confronts Léo and throws him overboard. (Note: La Hire 1911, First part: III)

Léo survives by using his coat as a parachute and is rescued by an English ship, which takes him to Spain. There, he learns that English inventor Klepton is hiding on Ibiza. Léo meets astronomer Camille Flammarion, seeking his aid for a journey to Mars, and travels to Ibiza to acquire an aircraft, the Condor, from Klepton, who joins as captain. (Note: La Hire 1911, First part: IV)

In Le Mystère des XV, Léo Saint-Claire, the Nyctalope, gathers his expedition team in Brazzaville and approaches the XV’s terrestrial base aboard the Condor. He receives a message revealing that his sister, Christiane, is being held in France. Suspecting betrayal, Léo interrogates Camille Flammarion, who is exposed as Thoth, an XV agent, and executed. Léo then infiltrates the base with Maximilien Jolivet, whose sister is among the captives on Mars. (Note: La Hire 1911, First part: VI)

=== Through the worlds ===
After an extended journey through the jungle, Léo Sainte-Claire and Maximilien Jolivet reach the radiotelegraph station. While Sainte-Claire searches for a way to enter, Jolivet is captured and tortured by the station's two guards. After three days of unsuccessful attempts to locate an entrance, Sainte-Claire gains access following Jolivet’s escape and neutralizes the guards. (Note: La Hire 1911, Second part: I)

Meanwhile, after a seven-day interplanetary journey, Koynos arrives on Mars ahead of Oxus. Summoned by the leader of the XV, Alkeus is assigned to prepare for the anticipated arrival of the Nyctalope. Distraught over his unrequited affection for Yvonne de Ciserat, Alkeus announces his intention to sacrifice himself by ramming his radioplane into Sainte-Claire’s. Displeased with Koynos's failure to eliminate Sainte-Claire and destroy the African base, Oxus instructs him to sacrifice himself as well if the first collision fails. Despite these orders, Koynos pledges to Xavière that he will spare Léo’s life. (Note: La Hire 1911, Second part: II)

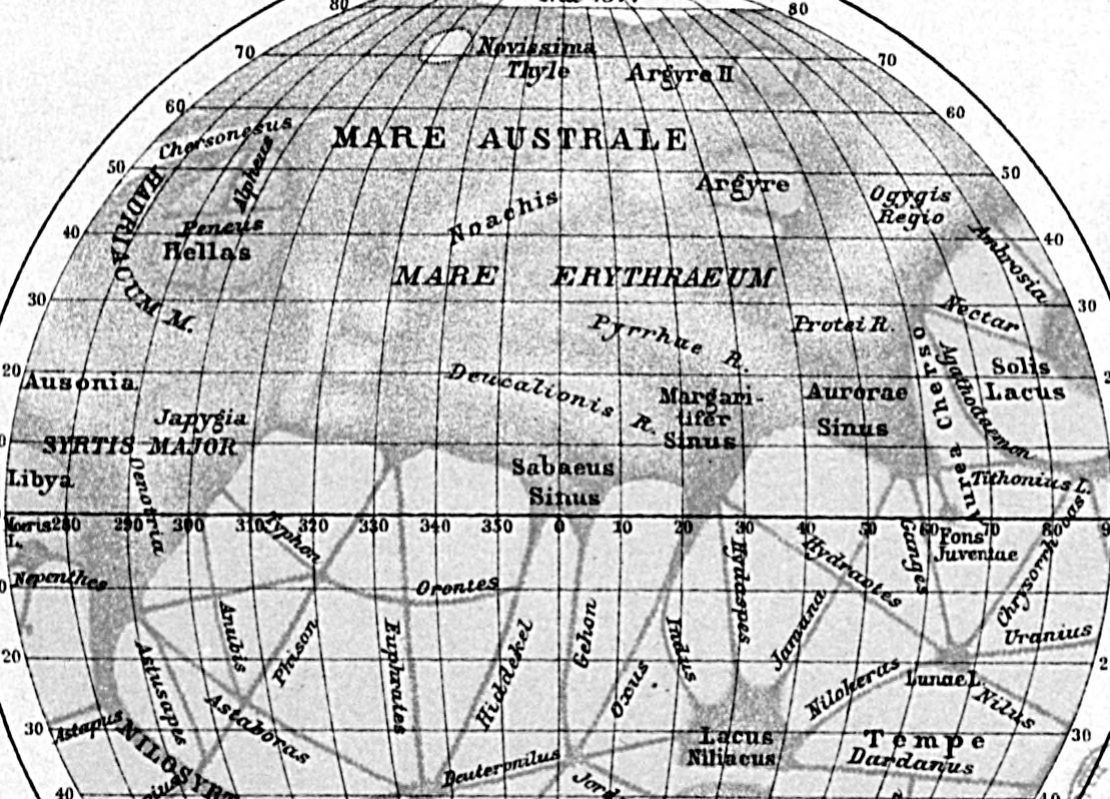
Representation of the planet Mars by Schiaparelli, showing Lake Niliaque (Lacus Niliacus) and the Island of Argyre.

Meanwhile on Earth, Léo Sainte-Claire interrogates the guards, Normand and Breton, to prevent the destruction of the station. Gaining insight into the operations of the XV organization, he organizes a mission to Mars with a group of fourteen individuals to rescue the captives. A secondary objective is to facilitate a potential French military intervention on the planet. (Note: La Hire 1911, Second part: III)

On Mars, Alkeus identifies five incoming radioplanes and carries out his suicide attack, successfully destroying one. (Note: La Hire 1911, Second part: IV)

=== On Mars ===
Léo Sainte-Claire learns that Alkeus’s suicide attack destroyed the aircraft piloted by Admiral de Ciserat. Shortly thereafter, another vessel approaches, piloted by Koynos, who warns him not to land on Argyre Island, where Oxus has concentrated his forces. The Nyctalope’s expedition instead lands on Niliaque Island, where the eleven survivors begin their exploration. (Note: La Hire 1911, Third part: I)

In Cosmopolis, Oxus observes that all his agents, except Kipper—who is guarding Félicie Jolivet—have fallen under the influence of the captives. Koynos returns and informs Oxus that Alkeus destroyed one of the Earth ships, but withholds information about the arrival of the remaining four. (Note: La Hire 1911, Third part: II)

Warned by a servant of Koynos about potential dangers, Léo Sainte-Claire decides to infiltrate Cosmopolis to meet with Koynos. (Note: La Hire 1911, Third part: III) Meanwhile, Koynos returns to Xavière de Ciserat and makes a declaration of affection, which elicits a strong emotional reaction from her sister, Yvonne. Overwhelmed by her feelings, Yvonne leads Koynos to her room. (Note: La Hire 1911, Third part: IV)

Upon arriving in Cosmopolis, Léo meets Koynos, who escorts him to Xavière. As Léo reunites with his fiancée, Oxus enters with his guards and orders the arrest of both men. (Note: La Hire 1911, Third part: V) They are brought before the tribunal of the XV, which, suspecting Koynos of betrayal and identifying Léo as a threat, sentences both to death. (Note: La Hire 1911, Third part: VI)

=== The Nyctalope against the XV ===
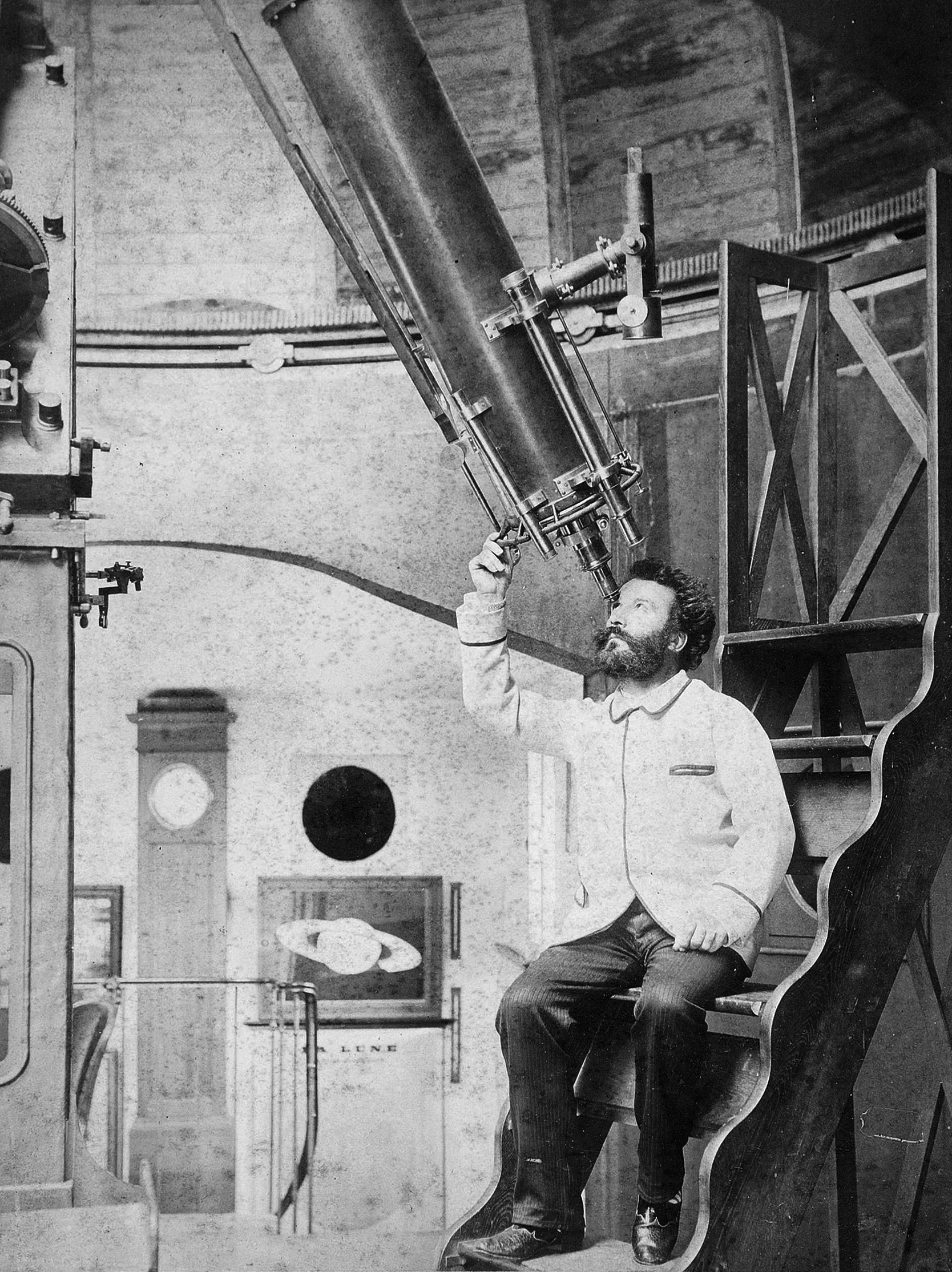
Astronomer Camille Flammarion joins the French expedition to conquer Mars.

After being sentenced to death by the tribunal, Koynos is executed by beheading, (Note: La Hire 1911, Fourth part: I) while Léo Sainte-Claire is imprisoned awaiting execution. That night, Xavière de Ciserat enters the dungeon and frees him. Sainte-Claire then proceeds to the residence of Oxus, (Note: La Hire 1911, Fourth part: II) where he uses his nyctalopic vision to overcome the guards and apprehend the leader of the XV. He informs Oxus of his plan to imprison him in secret for a month before reinstating him at the head of the organization. (Note: La Hire 1911, Fourth part: III) While in Oxus’s office, Léo examines the XV's plans and, impersonating Oxus, uses the telephone to instruct Kipper to begin the conquest of Mars.

As the members of the XV depart Cosmopolis under Kipper’s command, Léo Sainte-Claire uses the opportunity to reunite with his companions on Niliaque Island and bring them back to the city. Disguised in the white uniforms and green boots of the XV, the group presents itself to the inhabitants as the new governing body. Sainte-Claire publicly announces that, in the absence of the original XV—who have left to confront the Martians—eleven new members have been appointed to administer Cosmopolis, with himself assuming leadership under the name Oxus II. (Note: La Hire 1911, Fourth part: IV)

Kipper’s son, Abbou, recognizes Sainte-Claire and, after capturing Xavière, informs his father of the deception. (Note: La Hire 1911, Fourth part: V) Kipper returns with his forces and demands control of the city in exchange for Xavière. Sainte-Claire refuses and insists on Kipper’s surrender. Kipper then realizes that his son has been misled and that the body believed to be Xavière is that of Abbou’s mother. Enraged, Kipper kills his son and subsequently crashes his hydroplane. Following these events, the remaining members of the XV submit to Sainte-Claire. (Note: La Hire 1911, Fourth part: VI)

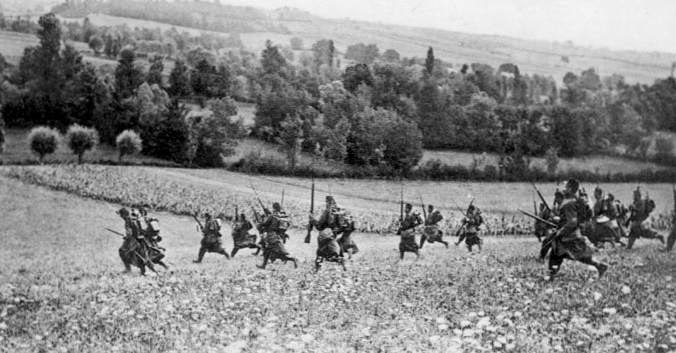
Assault by the French infantry in 1914.

Three weeks after the establishment of control over Cosmopolis, approximately 3,000 French soldiers arrive on Mars, having been invited by the Nyctalope. Among them are the astronomer Camille Flammarion, serving as a scientific advisor, and Christiane, the adoptive sister of Léo Sainte-Claire. He reveals to her that she is the daughter of the Hictaner and Moïsette, and thus the granddaughter of Oxus. (Note: La Hire 1911, Fourth part: VII) A council is convened, composed of the former members of the XV, Sainte-Claire’s companions, and the French military command. This body forms the new Earth-based military government on Mars. Oxus is appointed president of the council, and Sainte-Claire is named commander-in-chief.

Léo de Sainte-Claire and Xavière de Ciserat are married following their reunion. Under the Nyctalope’s command, the Earth expeditionary force departs from Argyre Island to engage the Martians. Confronted by a new weapon that impedes the advance of the Earth ships, Sainte-Claire undertakes a solo mission to capture a Martian for intelligence purposes. (Note: La Hire 1911, Fourth part: VIII) He successfully seizes control of a Martian tripod, infiltrates the enemy camp, and captures two Martians before returning to base. (Note: La Hire 1911, Fourth part: X)

=== Epilogue ===
After partially deciphering the Martian language, the Nyctalope sends one of the captured Martians back to negotiate with his people. A peace agreement is subsequently established with the three major Martian nations. Later, when conflict arises between two of these nations, the Earth delegation, under the leadership of the Nyctalope, plays a decisive role in the outcome. (Note: La Hire 1911, Conclusion)

=== Characters ===
==== The Nyctalope ====
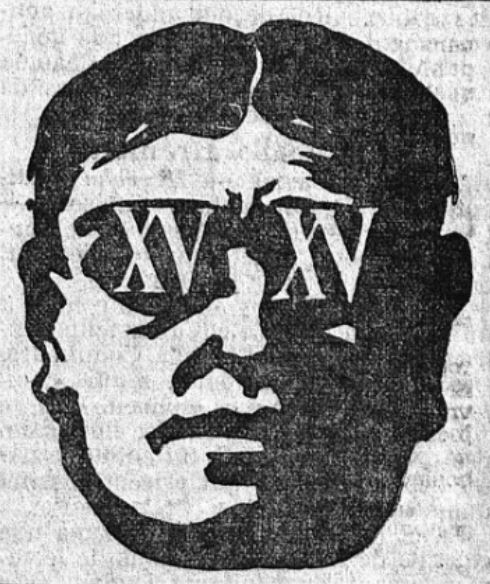
This advertisement featuring Nyctalope appeared in Le Matin on April 21, 1911, to announce the upcoming release of Mystère des XV.

Léo Sainte-Claire, a French explorer known for his night vision, is referred to by the nickname "the Nyctalope." He is portrayed as a bold adventurer and is the son of Jean Sainte-Clair, the protagonist of Jean de La Hire's earlier novel L’Homme qui peut vivre dans l’eau, published in 1909 in Le Matin.

The famous explorer who had pierced the veil of mystical Tibet and roamed the jungles of Central Africa. And he was familiarly called the Nyctalope, because of the rare faculty his eyes possessed of seeing at night as well and even better than in broad daylight.

— Jean de La Hire, Le Mystère des XV

Le Mystère des XV is the first adventure of Léo as recounted by Jean de La Hire, in which he sets off in pursuit of the organization known as the XV, responsible for kidnapping his fiancée, Xavière de Ciserat. Alongside his companions, he takes control of the XV station in the Congo, then travels to Mars to wage direct battle against the XV. Endowed with extraordinary willpower, he overcomes all obstacles through audacity and the psychological dominance he exerts over his adversaries.

After the defeat of the XV, the Nyctalope marries Xavière according to Martian customs.

==== Allies of the Nyctalope ====
The novel recounts the Nyctalope’s efforts to rescue his fiancée, Xavière de Ciserat, who has been abducted by the XV organization. Their leader, Oxus, orchestrates the kidnapping of fifteen young women—including Xavière, her sister Yvonne de Ciserat, and Félicie Jolivet—with the aim of making them wives for the leaders of a colony on Mars. However, the presence of these women disrupts Oxus’s plans due to the influence they exert over their captors. Xavière undermines Koynos’s loyalty, while Yvonne's actions contribute to Alkeus’s suicide. Yvonne, in turn, loses her sanity after learning of Koynos’s death. The XV organization engages in systematic abductions. Christiane Sainte-Claire, the Nyctalope’s adoptive sister, is also kidnapped in an attempt to manipulate him. Her origins are revealed at the end of the novel, when the Nyctalope informs Oxus that Christiane, newly arrived on Mars, is his granddaughter, the child of the Hictaner.

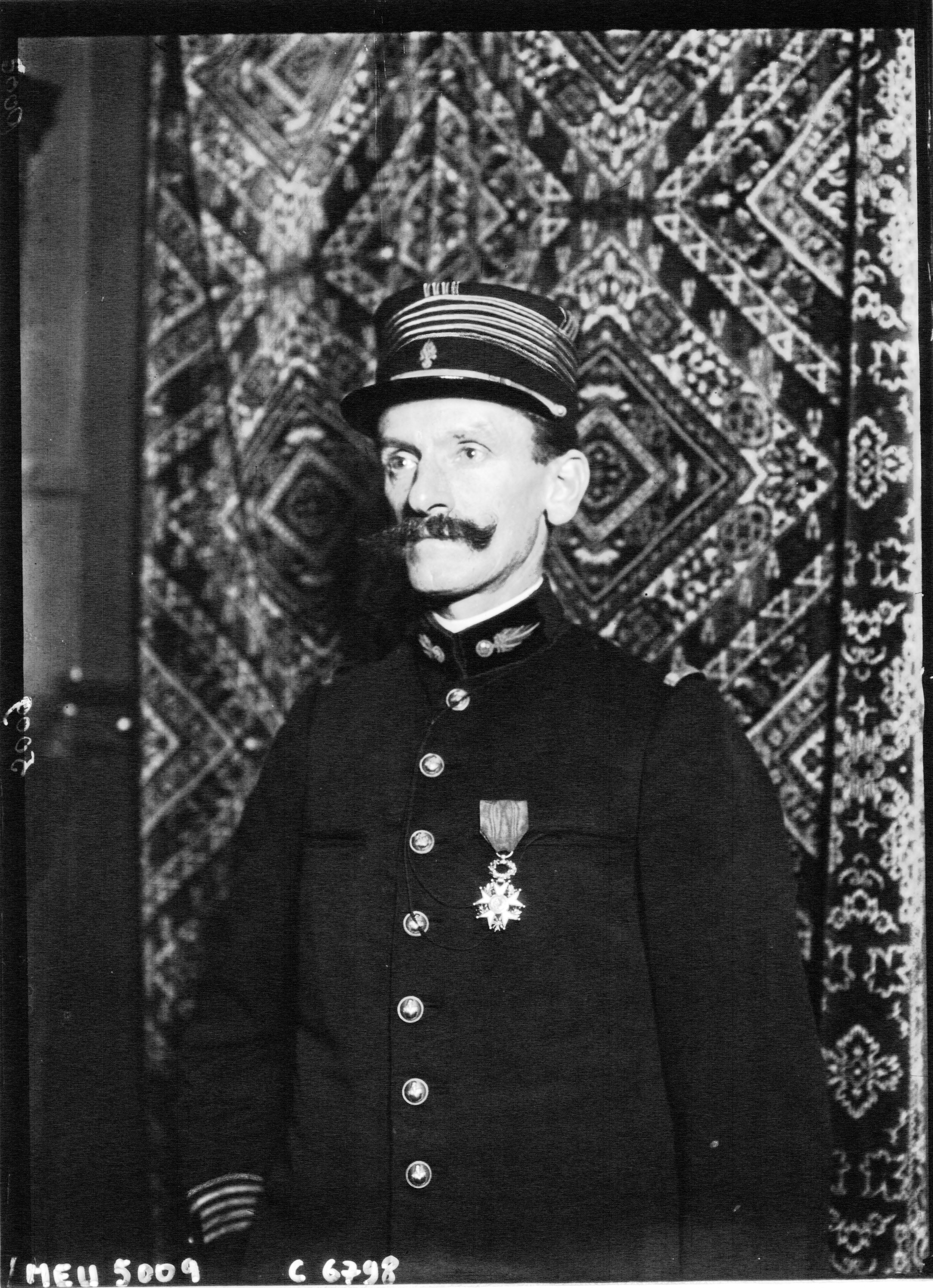
Photograph by Victor-Paul Bouttieaux (1909)

To pursue the kidnapped women, the Nyctalope assembles an initial team composed of Minister Louis de Ciserat (his future father-in-law), Ensign Damprich (whose sister is among the captives), Maximilien Jolivet, Quartermaster Bontemps, and valet Tory. De Ciserat is later killed during Alkeus’s suicide attack in space. The team is subsequently joined by Pary O’Brien, a seaman who rescued the Nyctalope in the Mediterranean, and Klepton, an English inventor of an aluminum aircraft powered by a liquid-air engine, residing in Ibiza. Meanwhile, on Earth, the head of security, Mr. Sanglier, works to dismantle the XV network, while Damprich is assigned to convince the Minister of War, General d'Amade, and President Léon Bourgeois to support a French military expedition to Mars.

A month later, Colonel Bouttieaux arrives on Mars with three thousand French soldiers to join the Nyctalope. Among the newcomers are astronomer Camille Flammarion as scientific advisor, Maurice Reclus as official historian of the French expedition, and journalist René François, correspondent for Le Matin. Among the troops, Paul Verneuil is assigned to locate the missing Nyctalope. After finding him, Verneuil assists in deciphering the operation of Martian tripods but is killed during their return to Cosmopolis.

==== The XV ====
The secret organization known as the XV, led by Oxus, establishes a base named Cosmopolis on the Martian island of Argyre to conquer the planet. Oxus, who had previously threatened Earth with the creature known as the Hictaner, selects fifteen members to administer the colony. Following his defeat by the Nyctalope, Oxus ultimately repents and agrees to govern the colony under French authority. Among the XV, Koynos serves as the primary leader. He falls in love with Xavière de Ciserat, one of the abducted women, and ultimately betrays Oxus to assist the Nyctalope. He is executed by decapitation for his betrayal. Other members of the XV also fall under the influence of their captives. Kipper, who abducts Félicie Jolivet, remains loyal to Oxus. Miniok, commander of the submarines; Ekaton, commander of the aircraft; and Kokreps, commander of the hydroplanes, are similarly affected by their prisoners. Alkeus, whose love for Yvonne de Ciserat is unreturned, conducts a suicide attack against Louis de Ciserat’s vessel. (Note: La Hire 1911, p. 4, June 2) Additional members of the colony include Alpha, who assists Koynos and informs the Nyctalope of Oxus’s intentions; (Note: La Hire 1911, p. 4, June 9) Banko, who serves as jailer of Xavière de Ciserat on Mars; and Abbou, the son of Kipper and a slave woman, who attempts to oppose the Nyctalope to gain his father’s approval. Abbou is ultimately deceived by Léo Sainte-Claire and killed by Kipper in a fit of rage. (Note: La Hire 1911, p. 5, July 1)

To support his plan for the conquest of Mars, Oxus enlists several accomplices on Earth. Upon learning that the Nyctalope is pursuing him, he instructs Bastien—personal secretary to the Chief of Security, Mr. Sanglier, and covert leader of the XV's affiliates in France—to infiltrate the rescue expedition for the abducted women. Bastien is identified by Damprich, who alerts Léo Sainte-Claire, leading to a trap. Seeking to eliminate a compromised agent, Koynos attempts to kill Bastien. Disillusioned, Bastien ultimately allies himself with the French expedition to Mars. (Note: La Hire 1911, p. 4, July 2) Following Bastien's failure, Thoth, the general delegate of the XV in Europe, is assigned to stop the Nyctalope. Disguised as the astronomer Camille Flammarion, he joins the rescue mission but is unmasked and executed by Léo. (Note: La Hire 1911, p. 4, May 16) Other agents of Oxus include Franz Montal and his associate Malteste, who are responsible for the abduction of Christiane Sainte-Claire. (Note: La Hire 1911, p. 6, May 13) She is imprisoned at the Château de Pierrefort in Cantal under the supervision of Franz’s brother, Noël de Pierrefort, who eventually becomes engaged to her. For interplanetary communication, the XV operates a hidden radiotelephone station in the Congo, used to coordinate the flight of radioplanes. Ordered to destroy the station to prevent the Nyctalope’s advance, the two guards, Normand and Breton, are captured and neutralized by Léo and Maximilien Jolivet, who then take control of the site. (Note: La Hire 1911, p. 4, May 30)

== Style and literary movement ==
=== Literary heritage ===
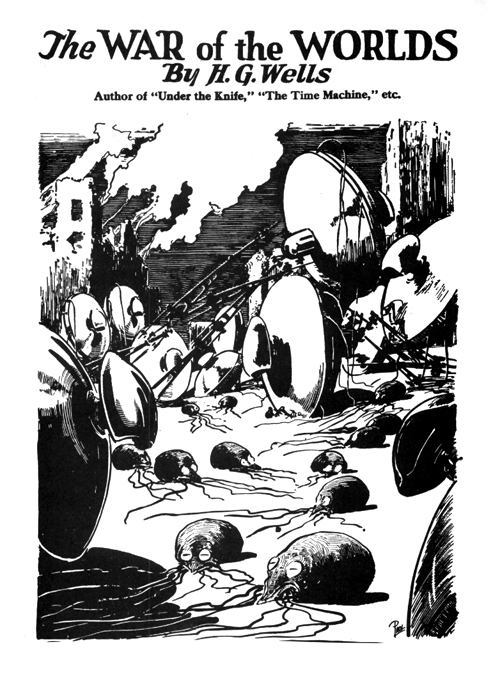
Illustration by Frank R. Paul from The War of the Worlds (1927).

The novel is introduced as a loose sequel to L'Homme qui peut vivre dans l'eau, published by Jean de La Hire two years earlier. The protagonist, Léo Sainte-Claire, is identified as the son of a secondary character from the earlier work, (Note: La Hire 1911, p. 2, April 23: “son of a ship captain who died ten years ago.”) while the antagonist, Oxus, (Note: Oxus, the main antagonist in L’Homme qui peut vivre dans l’eau, is left for dead at the end of the novel, although his body is never found.) reappears with new plans. (Note: La Hire 1911, p. 2, April 26: "It was Oxus! The very same man who, twenty-five years earlier, with the help of the monk Fulbert, had terrified the Earth with the Hictaner, his ingenious creation...")

An early and explicit reference is made to The War of the Worlds by H. G. Wells. (Note: La Hire 1911, p. 2, April 24: "Are the Martians all the same species as those who invaded England ten years ago?") In the narrative, Oxus seeks revenge for the failed Martian invasion of Earth, which occurred several years prior. Through his secret organization, the XV, he aims to conquer Mars. Jean de La Hire, writing as a biographer of the Nyctalope, (Note: In the epilogue, Jean de La Hire uses the first person to inform readers that he will continue the adventures of the Nyctalope. (Note: La Hire 1911, p. 4, July 17)) refers to Wells as a “historian” (Note: La Hire 1911, p. 4, May 17) who accurately chronicled these events in England.

In describing the Martians encountered during the Nyctalope’s expedition to Mars, La Hire briefly adopts the imagery established by Wells: “Three Martians stood upright, their body-head supported by eight tentacles planted straight into the ground,” (Note: La Hire 1911, p. 4, July 7) closely mirroring Wells’s own depiction:

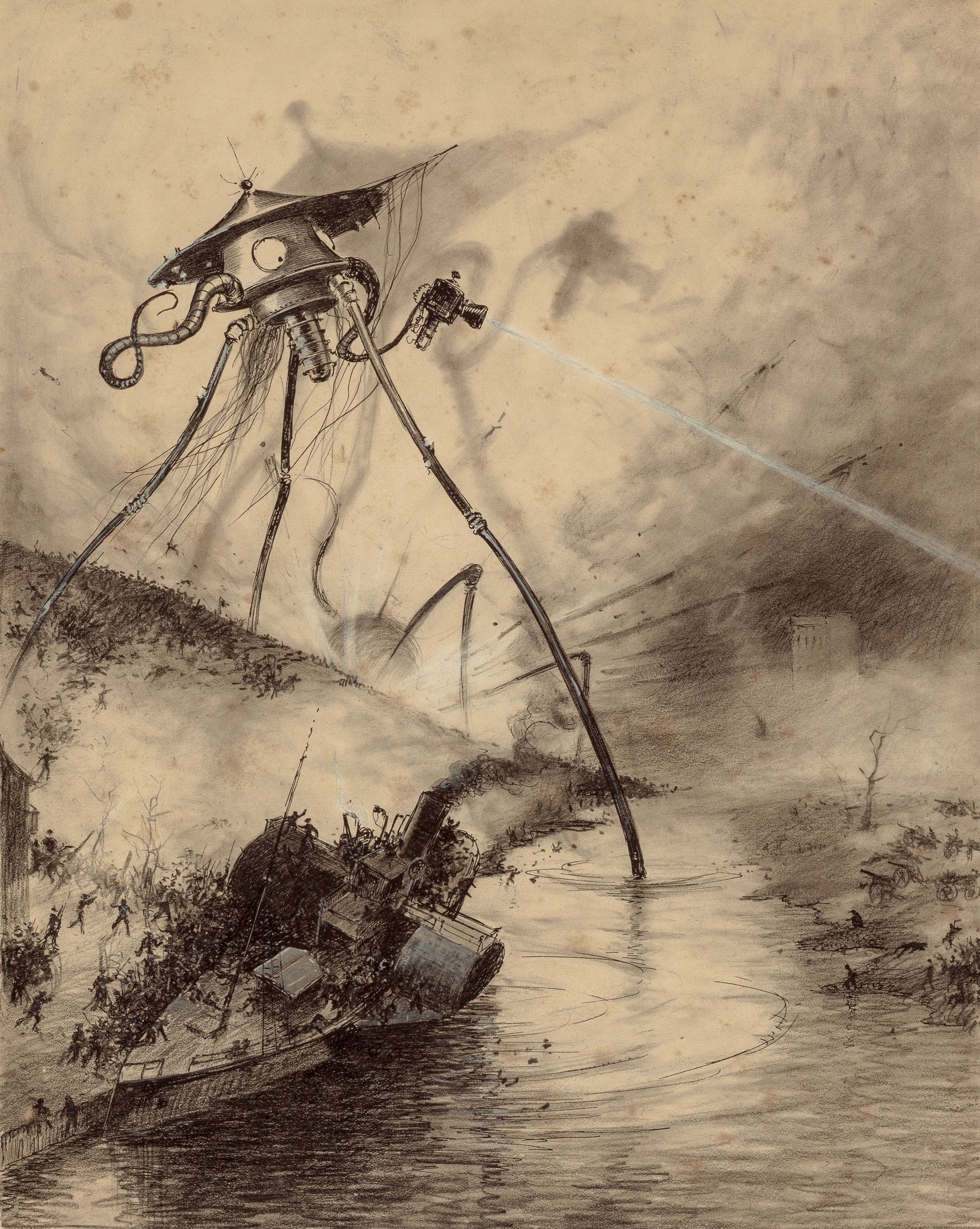
Illustration of a tripod in the Belgian edition of The War of the Worlds from 1906, signed Henrique Alvim Corrêa.

“They consisted of a large round body—or rather a large round head—about four feet in diameter and equipped with a face. This face had no nostrils—in fact, Martians seem to have had no sense of smell—but possessed two large dark eyes, immediately below which was a sort of cartilaginous beak. Behind this head or body—for I truly do not know which term to use—was a single tympanic surface, which has since been understood to be anatomically an ear, although it must have been nearly useless to them in our dense atmosphere. Clustered around the mouth were sixteen thin tentacles, almost like straps, arranged in two bundles of eight.” (Note: Wells 1898, p. 419)

He renames them “Kephales” to distinguish them from the bipedal Martians who serve as their food. (Note: La Hire 1911, p. 4, July 11: "A Martian is not a man, a body: it is a head. In Greek, head is kephalé. Why not Frenchify it and say a Képhale, as we say a man?") Jean de La Hire uses the foundation laid by H. G. Wells and expands upon it with additional explanations. He explains the Martian invasion of Earth as a search for food: Earthlings resemble the bipedal Martians whose blood nourishes the Kephales. (Note: La Hire 1911, p. 4, July 7: "A strange creature, a sort of bipedal half-bird, half-man, sat naked, his arms hanging down to his sides. This creature was white in color, with visibly soft, fatty flesh and no muscles.") The weapons used in The War of the Worlds—tripods equipped with their Heat-Ray (Note: Wells 1898, p. 419) and a toxic gas called Black Smoke, (Note: Wells 1898, p. 165) which the XV have learned to protect themselves from—are complemented by a new arsenal: kites whose vibration in the air, disturbed by airplanes, triggers an explosion that showers the area with steel fragments. (Note: La Hire 1911, p. 4, June 28)

Jean de La Hire’s Le Mystère des XV presents a reversal of the narrative found in H. G. Wells’s The War of the Worlds. In this work, Earthlings seek to conquer Mars through the secret organization of the XV.

The novel expands upon Wells’s fictional universe by introducing new concepts, including a division of Mars into three major Martian nations: “Three great nations of Kephales shared the planet. One, which could be called the island nation, encompassed the entire southern hemisphere of Mars. […] The capital of this immense nation—or rather the central seat of its government—was the fortress city of Zea, in the middle of the lake of the same name, in the vast land of Hellas. The other two nations, both continental, shared the northern hemisphere.” According to the narrative, only one of these nations attempted an invasion of Earth. Following its failure, it returned to internal conflict.

=== A work within the European science fiction movement ===
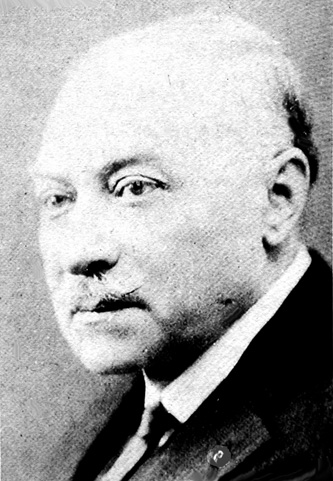
The novelist Gustave Le Rouge was a prominent French representative of the scientific marvelous genre in the early 20th century.

Jean de La Hire entered the science fiction genre, then referred to as “scientific marvelous,” with his 1908 novel The Lightning Wheel, which recounts the journey of a group of Earthlings to Mercury. This work contributed to his emergence as a prominent figure in French speculative fiction before World War I, particularly within the tradition of "post-Verne science fiction," characterized by a more imaginative and less scientifically rigorous approach than that of earlier authors. La Hire's work synthesizes elements from the writings of Jules Verne, H. G. Wells, and Camille Flammarion.

Le Mystère des XV is considered the first French narrative to explore the theme of human migration and colonization of another planet in a serious manner. Jean de La Hire approaches interplanetary travel not merely as a brief adventure, but also includes reflections on the establishment and development of an extraterrestrial colony. In the novel, the scientist Oxus settles on Mars with fifteen companions to found an ideal state. This interest in Mars aligns with a broader trend in European science fiction, particularly active in France, focused on the theme of Martian exploration. The novel is contemporary with works such as Docteur Omega by Arnould Galopin (1906), Le Prisonnier de la planète Mars and La Guerre des vampires by Gustave Le Rouge (1908–1909), and Uranie by Camille Flammarion (1912).

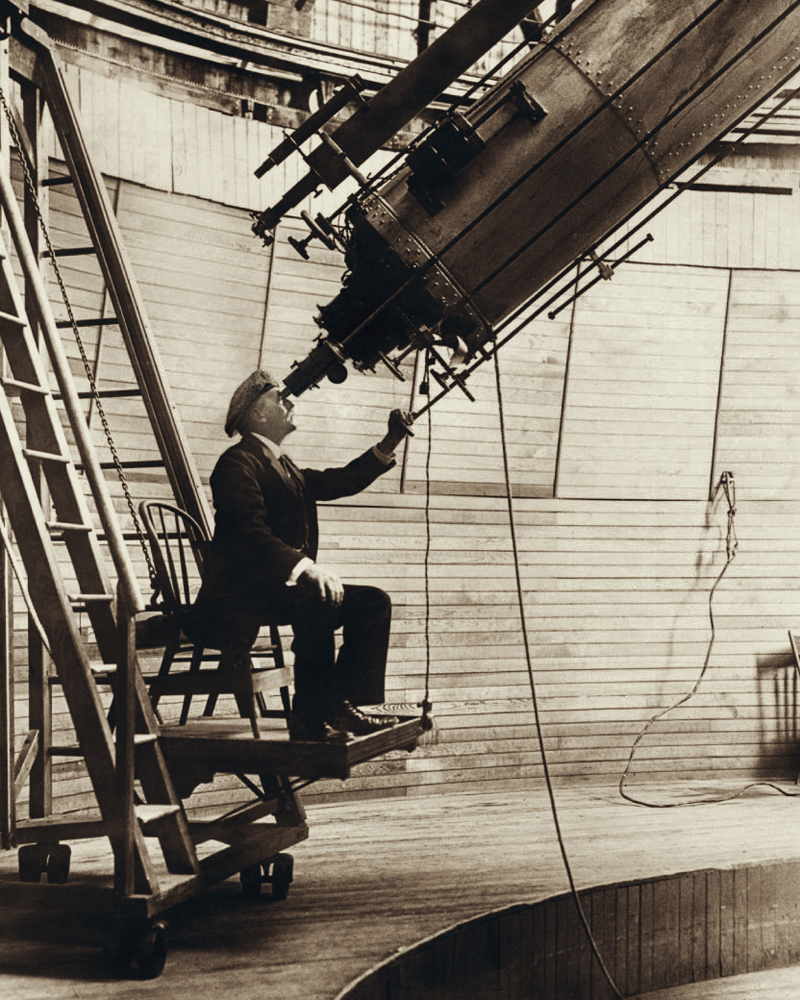
Percival Lowell observing Mars through a telescope in 1914.

The concept of a Martian civilization was notably promoted by American businessman and amateur astronomer Percival Lowell, who supported the theory of Martian canals. Between 1895 and 1908, he published three books on the subject. In France, however, this theory gained less traction due to Camille Flammarion’s skepticism regarding the existence of such canals, although he maintained a belief in life on Mars.

Le Mystère des XV is distinguished by its detailed depiction of interplanetary travel. In this regard, Jean de La Hire is a precursor of early 20th-century popular science fiction. The novel reflects the influence of Louis Blériot’s 1909 crossing of the English Channel, an event that significantly shaped public imagination and inspired writers such as La Hire to envision space travel as an extension of aviation. The inclusion of a space battle, (Note: La Hire 1911, p. 4, July 4) albeit limited in scope, also represents a notable development in the genre, opening new thematic possibilities for science fiction literature.

The originality of Jean de La Hire’s novel lies in its departure from contemporary science fiction works that envisioned artificial or fantastical means of travel to reach Mars. (Note: For example: Gullivar Jones (1905) by Edwin Lester Arnold reaches the planet thanks to a flying carpet; Arnould Galopin sends his Docteur Oméga (1906) to Mars using a substance called “repulsite” which reverses the effects of Earth's gravity; and in A Princess of Mars (1912), Edgar Rice Burroughs’ hero John Carter is literally “sucked” onto Mars.) Instead, La Hire presents spaceflight as a logical extension of aviation, suggesting the feasibility of regular interplanetary travel.

The novel presents a futuristic vision through the evolution of transportation technologies. In addition to radioplanes powered by Hertzian waves, which address the challenge of fuel supply, Jean de La Hire introduces the "Condor," an ornithopter with electrified wings designed by the inventor Klepton. This aircraft is capable of extended gliding flights using a liquid-air engine. Aerial navigation is portrayed as significantly advanced, with regular dirigible services of an improved République type that allow passengers to move along the deck safely due to elongated windows. Domestic air routes within France are complemented by international services, including weekly flights between Le Havre and New York, and Marseille and Algiers, as well as twice-monthly flights between Marseille and Tananarive, and Bordeaux, Timbuktu, and Brazzaville. The emergence of radioplanes—aircraft lifted by electromagnetic radio waves—makes interplanetary travel possible. These developments influence other transportation sectors: railways reduce fares, improve service quality, and transition to electric traction, while ocean liners face increased competition.

=== Adventure novel and popular literature ===
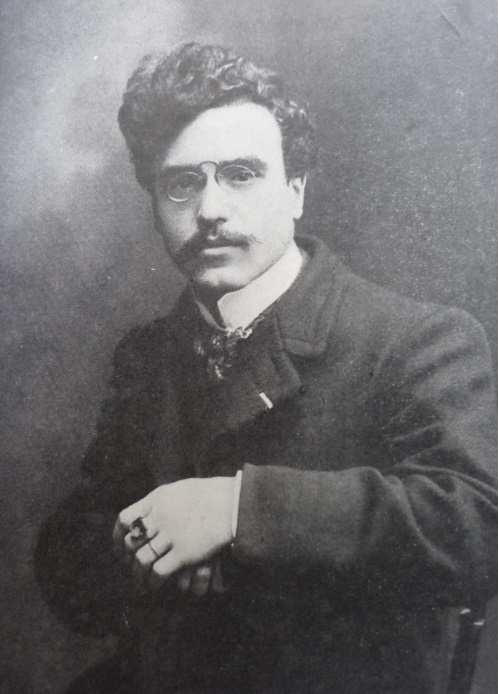
Photograph of Adolphe d'Espie, alias Jean de La Hire, circa 1905.

Despite incorporating elements of science fiction, Le Mystère des XV by Jean de La Hire uses interplanetary travel and scientific anticipation primarily as narrative devices. These elements function in service of the plot rather than as central themes, placing the novel within the tradition of classical adventure literature. The Martian setting serves primarily as a backdrop for the narrative.

The portrayal of Mars remains minimal, limited to brief descriptions intended to situate the action. Rather than exploring the speculative potential of a Martian setting, La Hire presents a realistic and familiar environment. Mars is depicted as a utopian or alternate-historical space, with little emphasis on its uniqueness. For example, upon arriving near Lake Niliaque, the protagonist compares the landscape to the French region of Sologne, noting: “So this was Mars?... Without the strange presence of the two moons, one might have believed oneself on Earth, in France, on the edge of a Sologne pond, on a calm and pure October night, with a pleasant, fragrant coolness.” (Note: La Hire 1911, p. 4, June 3) The novel relies on generic references to construct its setting, evoking a literary universe rooted more in intertextual conventions than in detailed world-building.

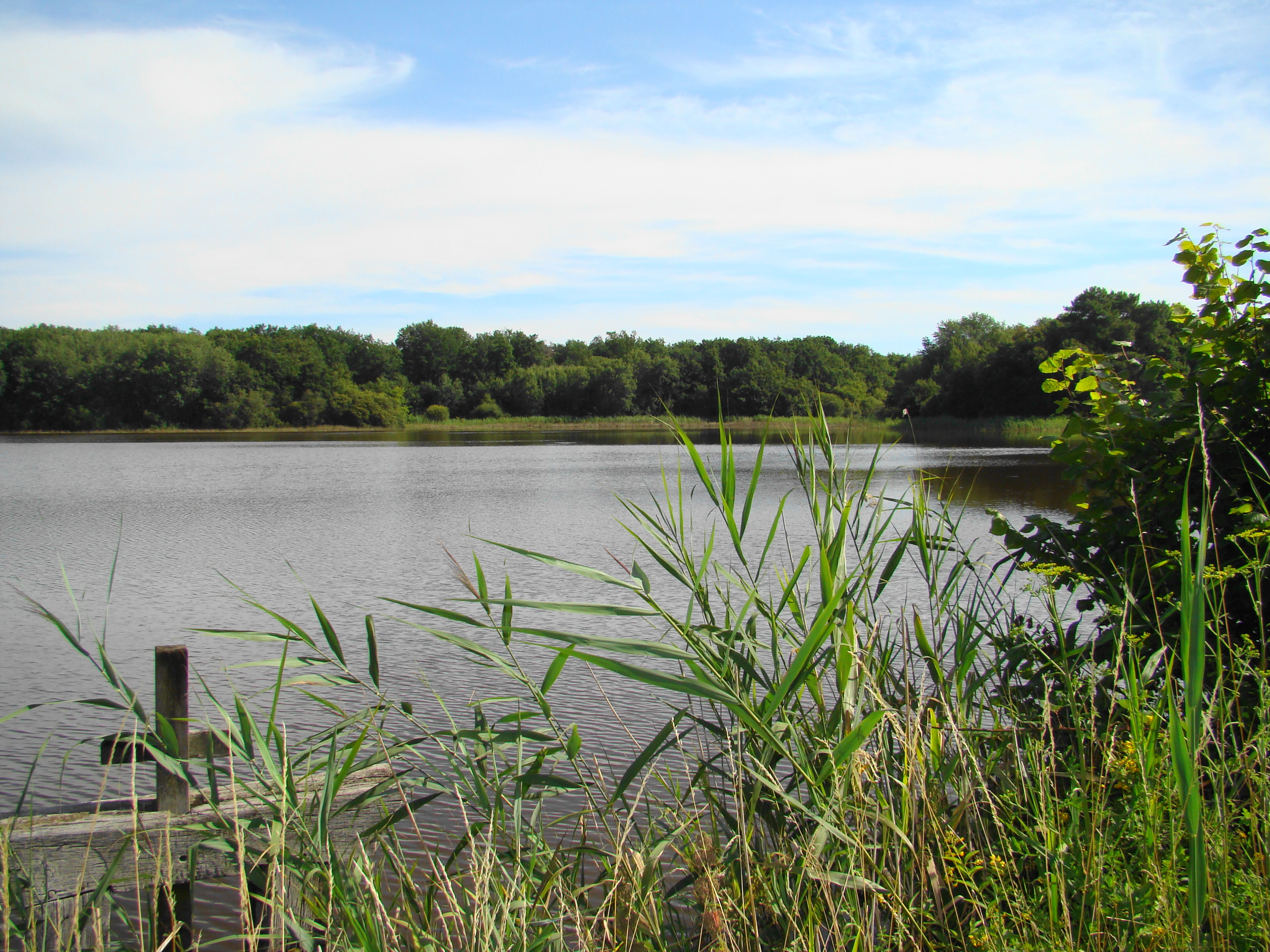
Jean de La Hire describes the island of Niliaque as a landscape in the Sologne region. Here, a pond between Lassay-sur-Croisne and Pruniers-en-Sologne.

The limited use of science fiction elements in Le Mystère des XV can be partly attributed to its format as a serialized novel. Published daily in Le Matin beginning on 23 April 1911, the work adhered to the conventions of newspaper serialization, which often required authors to adjust their narratives in response to reader feedback. Serialized in the “ground floor” section of the paper, the novel followed the conventions of popular adventure fiction, including the incorporation of a romantic subplot, which was prioritized over extensive exploration of Martian conquest.

Following the success of The Lightning Wheel in 1908, Jean de La Hire committed to writing popular fiction. He continued in this style with Le Mystère des XV. Unlike his later series Le Corsaire sous les mers (1912), in which narrative padding was used to increase compensation, Le Mystère des XV does not exhibit signs of deliberate expansion for financial gain.

One of the defining characteristics of Le Mystère des XV is its development of action-oriented science fiction, influenced by the geographic adventure novels of the time. In the early 20th century, the boundaries between science fiction and geographic adventure literature were not delineated. As with 19th-century travel narratives, which were often fictionalized by novelists, contemporary scientific and astronomical discoveries were similarly adapted into fictional works.

After becoming the leader of the XV, the Nyctalope combats the Martians previously depicted as invaders in The War of the Worlds, ultimately enabling the establishment of a French colony on Mars, administered by the now-repentant Oxus. Unlike the XV, the Nyctalope assumes the role of a colonizer acting on behalf of the French nation. This reflects a broader trend in colonial literature, where fictional narratives served propagandistic purposes—promoting expansionist ideals and supporting the notion of a "Greater France" in the aftermath of the 1870 defeat.

In colonial adventure literature, military conquest is often accompanied by a developmental or civilizing mission. Within this framework, the presence of women plays a central role, particularly in 19th-century narratives, where their function is to establish families abroad to ensure the stability and longevity of the colony. This theme is present in Le Mystère des XV, which also introduces a eugenic dimension. The character Oxus seeks not only to conquer Mars but also to create a new race of superhumans. After founding his colony with fifteen companions to establish an ideal state, he orchestrates the abduction of young women to achieve this goal. The members of the XV target prominent young women, despite efforts to maintain secrecy, a contradiction that reflects a logic of positive eugenics aimed at selecting individuals deemed to be of superior genetic heritage.

=== Style and narrative inconsistencies ===
Le Mystère des XV exhibits narrative inconsistencies due to its serialized format, which caused variations in story development. The demands of daily serialization necessitated improvisational writing with limited revision, leading Jean de La Hire to adapt the narrative in response to reader expectations. This approach resulted in frequent shifts in the plot's direction.

Jean de La Hire faced significant editorial constraints, including the requirement to produce two major novels per year for Le Matin, in addition to fulfilling contracts with publishers Tallandier and Ferenczi. This demanding schedule led him to work on multiple novels consecutively or simultaneously. To maintain productivity, he dictated his texts to a secretary or a dictaphone, a method that often affected the narrative style. These working conditions impacted the novel’s development: certain announced ideas remain undeveloped, some characters disappear without resolution, and the conclusion appears rushed. This approach also accounts for the use of elements borrowed from other works, particularly The War of the Worlds, which influences much of the plot.

== An original work ==
=== A precursor of the superhero genre ===
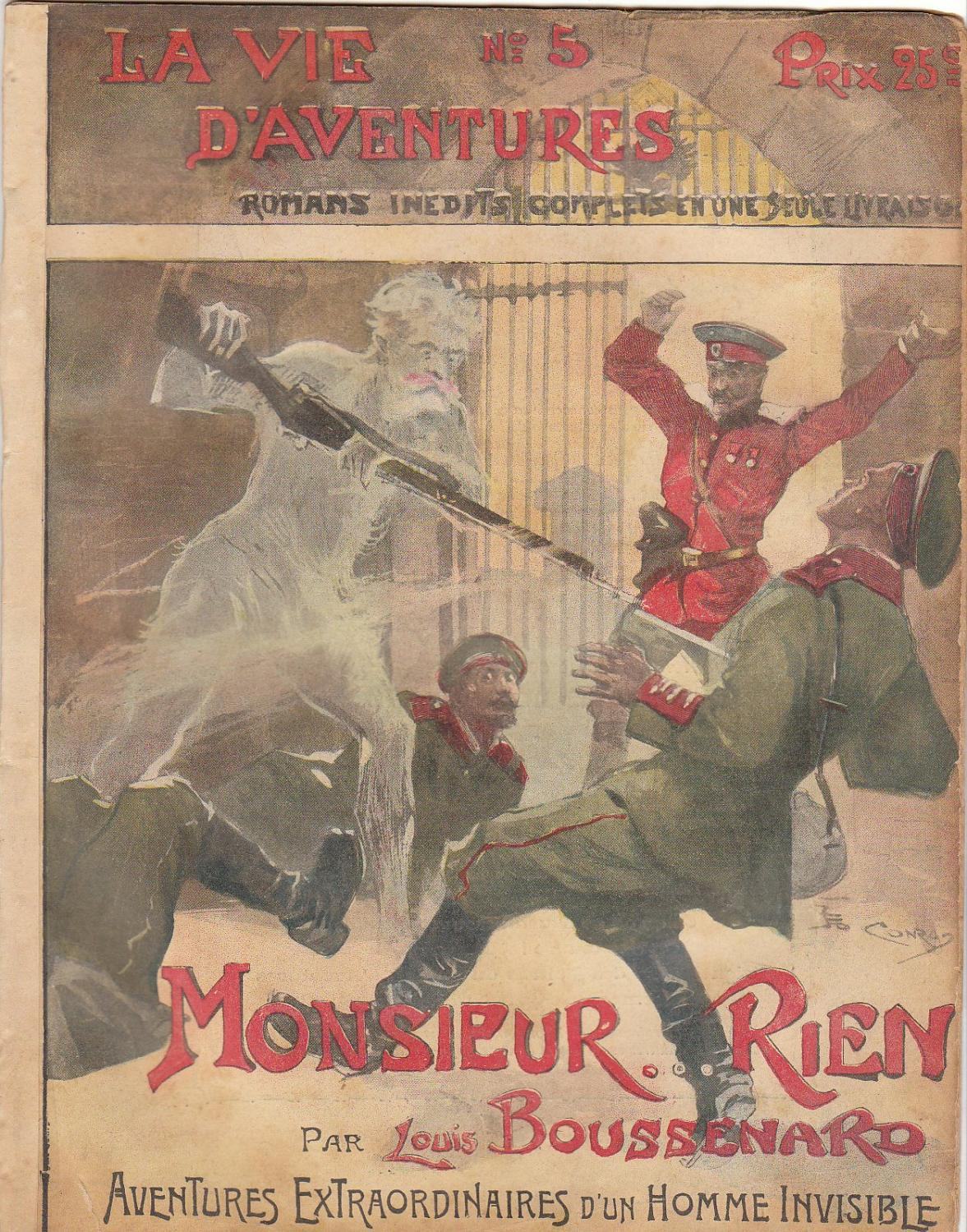
Like the invisible Monsieur Rien (1907) by Louis Boussenard, Nyctalope appears as a superhuman with exceptional abilities, a precursor to the figure of the superhero.

The Nyctalope, endowed with superpowers including nyctalopia (night vision) and advanced technology, is regarded as one of the earliest superhuman characters in literature and a potential precursor to the superhero genre.

In Le Mystère des XV, the Nyctalope’s power of nyctalopia is minimally emphasized. Instead, Jean de La Hire highlights the character’s status as a complete hero—physically, morally, and intellectually. His primary strength lies in his capacity to influence others, attributed to his exceptional force of will. Nevertheless, the Nyctalope rarely acts independently throughout the narrative. Key actions are carried out by other characters: Damprich identifies the presence of Koynos aboard the Gironde; Pary O'Brien rescues him after he is thrown overboard; (Note: La Hire 1911, p. 4, May 3) Max Jolivet enables his entry into the Congo station; (Note: La Hire 1911, p. 4, May 24) he reaches Mars only because Alkeus mistakenly targets another vessel; (Note: La Hire 1911, p. 4, May 31) and his landing is made possible by information provided by Koynos. At no point does he accomplish his objectives solely through his own actions.

In the tradition of adventure novels, the antagonist’s strength shapes the protagonist’s challenge. The XV, a weak and ineffective antagonistic group, provides little opposition, reducing the Nyctalope to an observer of their collapse rather than a dynamic superhero. This undermines his classification as a true superhero.

The Nyctalope’s night vision symbolizes the ideology of progress, positioning him as a prototype for a new era’s superhuman figure. While his status as the first modern superhero is debated, Jean de La Hire’s novel is recognized as an early influence on the superhero genre.

=== Character treatment ===
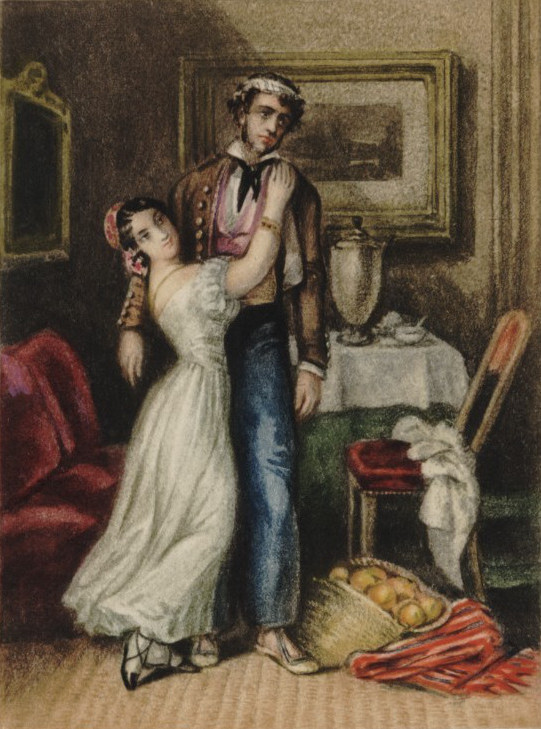
Similar to Carmen, the archetypal femme fatale, Xavière de Ciserat uses her seductive powers to manipulate her captor.

Jean de La Hire’s Le Mystère des XV features a distinctive portrayal of Xavière de Ciserat, a heroine with femme fatale characteristics. Unlike traditional depictions of feminine, seductive figures who use charm to achieve their goals, Xavière actively resists her captor, Koynos, and undermines his loyalty to the antagonist Oxus through her charisma and presence. This portrayal marks a departure from conventional representations in popular novels, presenting a bold heroine who exerts influence over adversaries through seductive power.

In Jean de La Hire’s Le Mystère des XV, several characters face tragic endings that contribute minimally to the narrative. For instance, Paul Verneuil, a soldier, dies during the pursuit of the Nyctalope, and Yvonne de Ciserat descends into madness after her lover Koynos’s death.

Unlike the conventions of contemporary adventure literature, where villains typically face harsh punishment to reinforce moral lessons, La Hire takes a more lenient approach. The antagonist Oxus is redeemed and established as the leader of the Martian colony, acting in the service of France rather than personal gain.

=== Adventures difficult to date ===
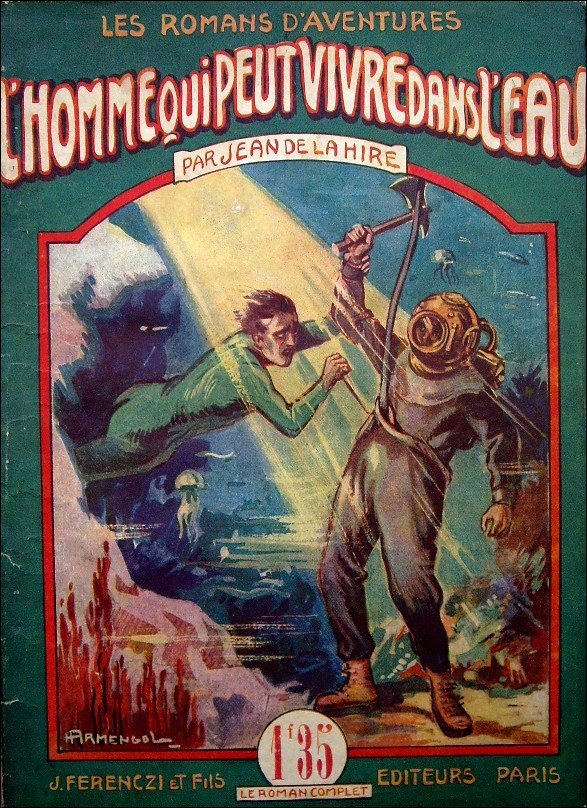
L'Homme qui peut vivre dans l'eau recounts events that took place twenty-five years before The Mystery of the Fifteen.

The serialized publication of Jean de La Hire’s Le Mystère des XV was shaped by editorial modifications responding to reader expectations, leading to narrative inconsistencies, particularly in the timeline. A press release from Le Matin states the story begins in September 1934, while references to L'Homme qui peut vivre dans l'eau (1909) suggest a setting around 1933, approximately twenty-five years later. The novel’s futuristic themes are thus set in a speculative 1930s, as envisioned in 1910.

The internal chronology of Jean de La Hire’s Le Mystère des XV contains inconsistencies that obscure the narrative’s timeframe. For instance, Xavière’s reference to a Martian invasion attempt ten years (Note: La Hire 1911, p. 2, April 24) prior suggests a setting around 1904. (Note: In The War of the Worlds, the invasion begins in 1894. (Note: Wells 1898, p. 581)) This is reinforced by Camille Flammarion’s age, given as 62, (Note: La Hire 1911, p. 4, May 5) which, given his birth in 1842, places the events around 1903. The inclusion of contemporary figures like Flammarion (Note: La Hire 1911, p. 2, May 4) and Maurice Reclus (Note: La Hire 1911, p. 6, May 17) indicates an intent to set the story near the time of its publication.

The timeline of Jean de La Hire’s Le Mystère des XV implies that events in his earlier work, L’Homme qui peut vivre dans l’eau, occurred around 1878–1879. As a result, Le Mystère des XV is set not in a future era but in an alternative present relative to its publication.

== Publication and legacy ==
=== French editions and international distribution ===
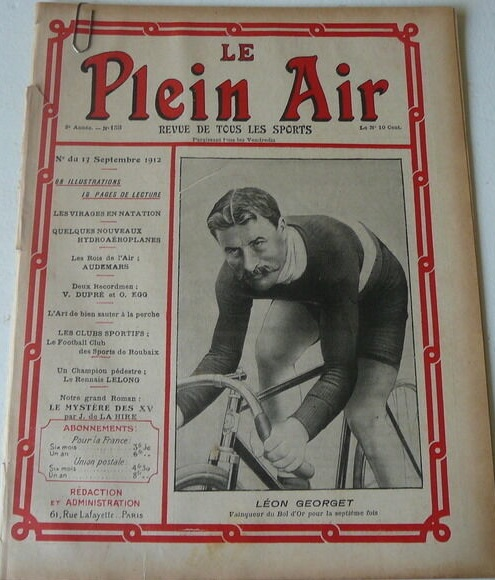
Cover of the sports magazine Le Plein Air dated September 13, 1912, publishing the serialized novel Le Mystère des XV.

==== French publication ====
Jean de La Hire’s Le Mystère des XV was serialized in Le Matin from April 23 to July 17, 1911. Aimed at a general audience unfamiliar with the genre, the novel’s abrupt conclusion, just as it approached the theme of Martian conquest, may reflect editorial truncation or its innovative nature for the period.

Jean de La Hire’s Le Mystère des XV was republished as a serial in Le Plein Air from July 12, 1912, to January 10, 1913, with illustrations by Georges Léonnec. It was later issued in book form in 1922 by Éditions Ferenczi as two volumes, Le Mystère des XV and Le Triomphe de l’amour, within the “Les Romans d’aventures” collection (numbers 8 and 9), featuring cover art by Gontran Ranson.

In 1954, Le Mystère des XV was republished by Éditions Jaeger in two volumes, Le Secret des XII and Les Conquérants de Mars, as part of the “Fantastic” collection (numbers 8 and 9). This edition featured changes, including renaming the protagonist Léo the Nyctalope to Hugues Cendras and Oxus to Arkhus, with cover art by René Brantonne. In 2021, Éditions P.N.R.G. reissued the original novel in two volumes, Le Mystère des XV and Le Nyctalope contre les XV.

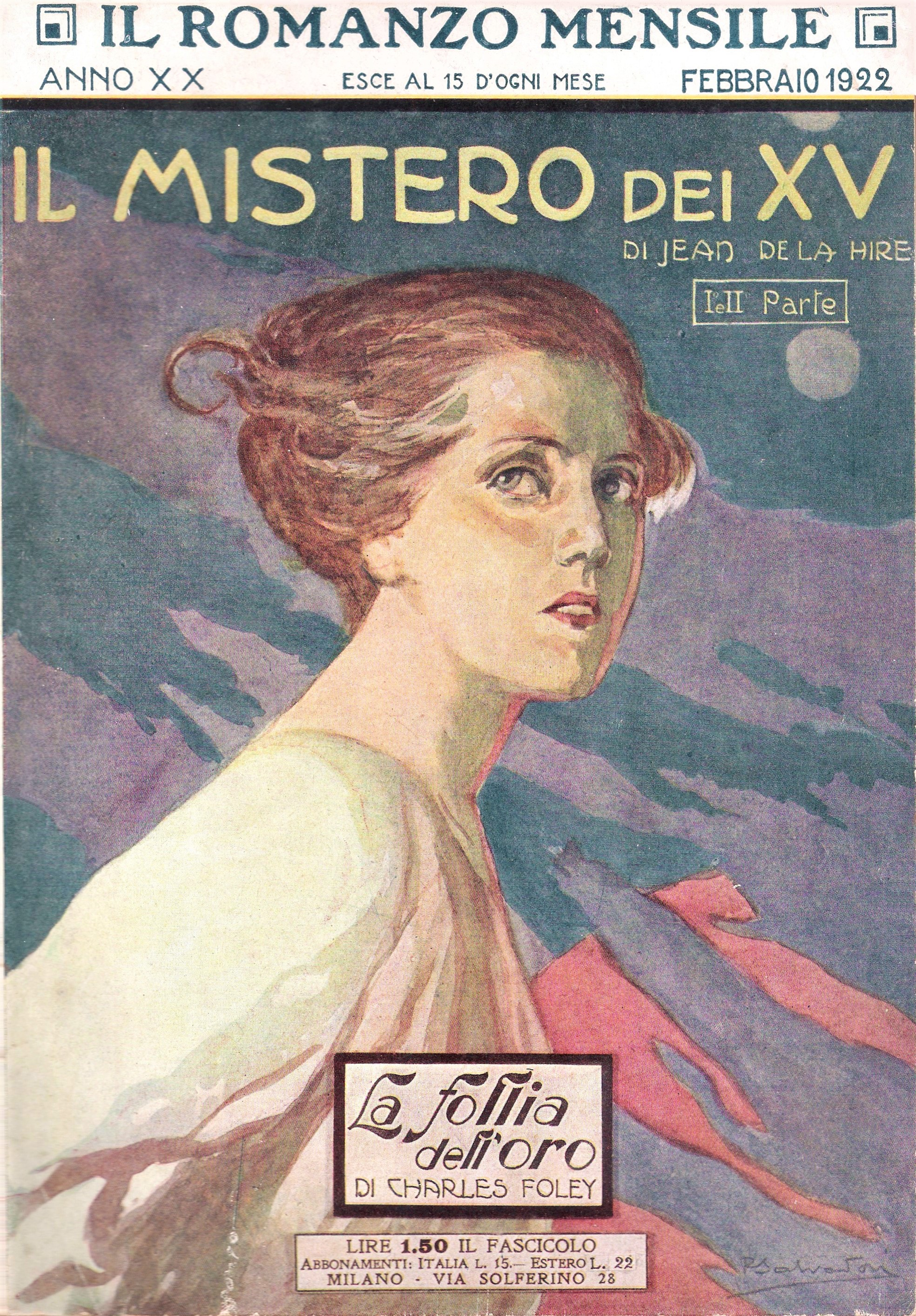
Italian publication of Il Mistero dei XV in 1922 by Corriere della Sera.

==== Foreign language circulation ====
Following its serialization in Le Matin in 1911, Jean de La Hire’s Le Mystère des XV was translated into Russian in 1912 as Тайна XV-ти. In 1922, coinciding with its second French edition by Éditions Ferenczi, it was translated into Italian and published in two volumes by Corriere della Sera as part of the Il Romanzo Mensile collection. An English translation, titled The Nyctalope on Mars, was published in 2008 by Black Coat Press, translated by Brian Stableford and initiated by Jean-Marc Lofficier to revive forgotten popular literature. A second Russian edition appeared in 2013.

=== The novel’s place in the Nyctalope Adventures ===
Le Mystère des XV, the first volume in Jean de La Hire’s Nyctalope series, initiated a collection of approximately fifteen novels published between 1911 and 1955. Most were initially serialized in newspapers before being released by various publishers. Despite La Hire’s efforts to consolidate the series under a single publisher, such as Jules Tallandier, he could not establish a unified collection. By reintroducing characters from L’Homme qui peut vivre dans l’eau in Le Mystère des XV, La Hire aimed to create a literary saga, but inconsistencies across the novels hindered a cohesive narrative cycle.

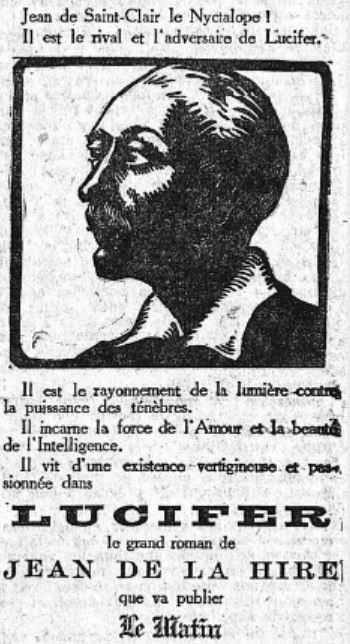
Portrait of Nyctalope in an advertisement announcing the second volume of his adventures in 1921. His name was changed (to Jean de Saint-Clair) and his physical appearance was altered.

The Nyctalope’s name varies across Jean de La Hire’s series: in Le Mystère des XV (1911), he is Léo Sainte-Claire, in Lucifer (1921), he is Jean de Saint-Clair, and later volumes use Léo (or Léon) Saint-Clair. His physical description also evolves, shifting from a slim, short figure in 1911 to a tall, athletic one in subsequent works.

In 1923, writing as Philippe Néris, La Hire featured a cameo of the Nyctalope, named Léo Sainclair, in Alcantara. A thief, Rex Sainclair, claims to be the Nyctalope’s cousin, prompting the police to contact Mars via radio to verify, a claim Léo denies.

The Nyctalope series by Jean de La Hire lacks continuity due to the protagonist’s inconsistent romantic relationships. In Le Mystère des XV (1911), Léo marries Xavière de Ciserat, but she does not appear in later volumes, though other Ciserat family members remain. In Lucifer (1922), Xavière is replaced by Laurence Païli, an opera singer. In La Croisière du Nyctalope (1936), Léo is single again. This pattern persists, with romantic partners or wives rarely reappearing in subsequent novels.

To address inconsistencies in Jean de La Hire’s Nyctalope series, scholars and publishers have proposed explanations. In 1972, Jacques Van Herp suggested two chronological frameworks: one set in the real world and another in a parallel universe. Novels such as L’Homme qui peut vivre dans l’eau (1909), Le Mystère des XV (1911), Lucifer (1921), and Le Roi de la Nuit (1943) belong to the parallel framework, depicting an alternate world from around 1910 with France colonizing Mars, a German empire in Central Asia, and underwater liners. In the 2010s, Black Coat Press and its French imprint Rivière Blanche published new short stories to resolve inconsistencies. For example, Romain Leary’s Les Enfants d’Hercule explores Xavière de Ciserat’s fate, her children, and the Martian colony’s decline after discovering a Martian artifact.

== See also ==
- 1911 in science fiction

== Bibliography ==
- Compère, Daniel (1984). Les Cahiers de l'Imaginaire [The Notebooks of the Imagination] (in French). Vol. 13. Rennes: Société des Cahiers de l'Imaginaire.
- Costes, Guy; Altairac, Joseph (2018). Rétrofictions : encyclopédie de la conjecture romanesque rationnelle francophone, de Rabelais à Barjavel, 1532-1951 [Retrofictions: encyclopedia of rational fictional conjecture in French, from Rabelais to Barjavel, 1532-1951]. Interface (in French). Vol. 2: lettres M à Z. Amiens, Paris: Encrage/Les Belles Lettres. ISBN 978-2-25144-851-0.
- Fournier, Xavier (2014). Super-héros. Une histoire française [Superheroes: A French History] (in French). Paris: Huginn&Muninn. ISBN 978-2364801271.
- Gorlier, Emmanuel (2011). Nyctalope ! L'Univers extravagant de Jean de La Hire [Nyctalope! The extravagant universe of Jean de La Hire]. Rivière Blanche (in French). Black Coat Press. ISBN 978-1-61227-016-6.
- Lanuque, Jean-Guillaume (2013). "Jean de la Hire : le patriotisme anticommuniste d'un imaginaire surhumain" [Jean de la Hire: the anti-communist patriotism of a superhuman imagination]. Dissidences (in French) (5).
- Letourneux, Matthieu (2007). "Répétition, variation… et autoplagiat : Les pratiques d'écriture de Jean de La Hire et la question des stéréotypes dans les genres populaires" [Repetition, variation... and self-plagiarism: Jean de La Hire's writing practices and the question of stereotypes in popular genres]. Loxias (in French) (17).
- Lofficier, Jean-Marc (2007). "Not Alone in the Dark. The Tumultuous Life and Troubled Times of the Nyctalope". The Nyctalope vs. Lucifer. Black Coat Press. ISBN 978-1932983982.
- Stableford, Brian (2011). "Brian Stableford : préface et postface à l'édition américaine du Mystère des XV" [Brian Stableford: preface and afterword to the American edition of The Mystery of the Fifteen]. Nyctalope ! L'Univers extravagant de Jean de La Hire [Nyctalope! The extravagant universe of Jean de La Hire]. Rivière Blanche (in French). Black Coat Press. pp. 153–169. ISBN 978-1-61227-016-6.
- Van Herp, Jacques (1956). "Un maître du feuilleton : Jean de La Hire" [A master of the serial: Jean de La Hire]. Fiction (in French) (37). OPTA.
- Van Herp, Jacques; Leborgne, André; Oliver-Martin, Yves (1972). Cahiers d'études n°1 : Cahier Jean de La Hire [Study notebooks no. 1: Jean de La Hire notebook] (in French). Éditions de l'Hydre.
  - Van Herp, Jacques; et al. (1972a). "Introduction". Cahiers d'études n°1 : Cahier Jean de La Hire (in French).
  - Van Herp, Jacques; et al. (1972b). "La science-fiction" [Science fiction]. Cahiers d'études n°1 : Cahier Jean de La Hire (in French).
  - Van Herp, Jacques; et al. (1972c). "Les inventions" [Inventions]. Cahiers d'études n°1 : Cahier Jean de La Hire (in French).
  - Van Herp, Jacques; et al. (1972d). "Quelques résumés" [Some summaries]. Cahiers d'études n°1 : Cahier Jean de La Hire (in French).
  - Van Herp, Jacques; et al. (1972e). "La guerre... la guerre..." [War... war...]. Cahiers d'études n°1 : Cahier Jean de La Hire (in French).
  - Van Herp, Jacques; et al. (1972f). "Biographie du Nyctalope" [Biography of Nyctalope]. Cahiers d'études n°1 : Cahier Jean de La Hire (in French).
