= 1911 in science fiction =

The year 1911 was marked, in science fiction, by the following events.

== Births ==
- January 24 : René Barjavel, French writer (died 1985)
- January 24 : Catherine Lucille Moore, American writer (died 1987)
- February 17 : Margaret St. Clair, American writer (died 1995)
- March 13 : L. Ron Hubbard, American writer (died 1986)
- June 20 : Stanley Mullen, American editor and writer (died 1974)
- July 30 : Reginald Bretnor, American writer (died 1992)
- August 23 : Otto Binder, American writer (died 1974)
- October 2 : Jack Finney, American writer (died 1995)

== Awards ==
The main science-fiction Awards known at the present time did not exist at this time.

== Literary releases ==
=== Novels ===
- Modern Electrics begins serialization of Ralph 124C 41+, by editor/owner Hugo Gernsback.
- Fantômas, by Pierre Souvestre and Marcel Allain.
- Le Mystère des XV by Jean de La Hire

=== Short stories and story collections ===
- The Country of the Blind and Other Stories by H. G. Wells

== See also ==
- 1911 in science
- 1910 in science fiction
- 1912 in science fiction
