= Éditions Tallandier =

French publishing house

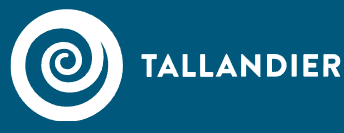
- Éditions Tallandier logo in 2024
- Status: 66% owned by Artémis
- Founded: 1901
- Founder: François Polo, Georges Decaux and Jules Tallandier
- Country of origin: France
- Headquarters location: Paris
- Key people: Xavier de Bartillat (Vice President)
- Fiction genres: History, humanities, essays
- Official website: https://www.tallandier.com/

Éditions Tallandier is a French publishing house founded in 1901. It is the successor to La Librairie Illustrée (1875–1900), itself the successor to Librairie Polo, founded in 1871.

Although the company's initial development was based mainly on publishing collections of popular novels, Éditions Tallandier is best known for its catalog of historical essays, which, at the beginning of the twentieth century, earned the company its letters of nobility with works by Madelin, Calmette, Lavedan, and Lavisse. They continue to publish the works of historians such as Emmanuel de Waresquiel, Jean Tulard, Marc Ferro, and Michel Winock.

In the 2010s, their catalog expanded to include essays on the contemporary world.

== History ==
=== Heirs of Librairie Polo – La Librairie Illustrée ===
Founded in 1871 by François Polo and Georges Decaux, Librairie Polo became one of the leading names in popular publishing in less than twenty years. By 1875, the company had rebranded as “La Librairie Illustrée” and gained recognition for publishing illustrated periodicals such as La Caricature, Journal des Voyages, Musée Universel, and La Science Illustrée. In 1890, Decaux, ill, retired and left his shares to his employee and friend Désiré Armand Montgredien (born April 28, 1853, in Passy), who founded Montgredien & Cie.

Brothers Charles and Jules Tallandier, initially partners in Montgredien & Cie, which they had founded in 1896 with Désiré Armand Montgredien, took over La Librairie Illustrée in 1900. Then, in October 1901, Jules took over the publishing business from his brother, who had retired for health reasons, and bought out Montgredien's shares. The company then took the name “Librairie Illustrée Montgredien & Cie, Jules Tallandier, Successeur”, and in 1902 became “Librairie Illustrée – J. Tallandier, Éditeur”.

=== Éditions Jules Tallandier before 1918 ===
Inheriting the popular weekly Journal des Voyages founded in 1877 by Maurice Dreyfous, Tallandier launched a number of newspapers (such as Mon Bonheur, Le Journal de la Femme, and Dimanche, le miroir de la semaine created in June 1945), history periodicals (such as Lisez-moi Historia, which later became Historia), and popular periodicals (such as L'Œil de la police). He also launched collections of popular novels (such as “Le Livre national”), and between the wars became one of the leading publishers of periodical novel collections, along with Arthème Fayard and Ferenczi.

=== Tallandier since 1918 ===
In 1931, the Hachette group acquired 60% of the capital and took over distribution via Messageries Hachette. Editions Tallandier was initially run by Jules Tallandier's son-in-law, Rémy Dumoncel (1888–1945), who had married Germaine Tallandier. After Jules Tallendier's death on January 12, 1933, management was handed over to Henri Manhès. During the Occupation, the company's headquarters were transferred to Clermont-Ferrand. Henri Manhès was arrested for acts of resistance and deported on January 22, 1944. Rémy Dumoncel was arrested on May 4, 1944, for acts of resistance, and died in deportation in 1945. After World War II, his son Maurice Dumoncel (1919–2013), grandson of Jules Tallandier and the company's emblematic chairman, ran Editions Taillandier for 40 years. Jacques Marchandise (1918–2002) was briefly Chairman until 1981 when Matra bought out Hachette.

In November 1997, François de L'Espée (1943–1998), former sales director of Larousse, bought out the entire share capital of Tallandier.

Since 1999, Editions Tallandier has been owned by the Artémis Group (66.6%) and, since 2015, by Xavier de Bartillat, who acquired the shares of La Martinière (initially acquired for 34% in 2001) and was appointed chairman and CEO of Tallandier.

In 2010, the catalog included over a thousand titles, with around sixty new releases per year. In 2020, the catalog led over 2,100 titles, including 450 for the Texto collection (paperbacks) and around 100 new titles each year.

Tallandier is distributed by CDE and Madrigall.

== Collections ==
=== Current collections ===
- Cétéki – Cétékoi (youth)
- Libre à elles
- En 100 questions
- Histoire de
- Le Monde selon
- Tallandiers Essais
- Texto (paperbacks)

=== Former periodical collections ===
- À la page
- À travers l'univers
  - Aventures vécues de mer et d'outre-mer
  - Aventures étranges – voyages lointains
- Aventures du Far-west
- Les Beaux Romans dramatiques
- Bibliothèque d'aventures et de voyages
- Bibliothèque nationale
- Les Bleuets
- Les Chevaliers de l'Aventure
- Le Cercle du nouveau livre
- Le Cercle romanesque
- Cinéma-bibliothèque
- Ciné-roman-film
- Collection bleue
- Criminels et Policiers
- Festival du roman
- Floralies, best-selling sentimental collection
- Grandes aventures et voyages excentriques
- Grands Romans d'aventures
- L'Histoire en Batailles
- Historia Magazine – La Guerre d'Algérie
- Le Journal de la France
- Le Livre d'aventures
- Le Livre national
  - Livre national rouge
  - Livre national bleu
  - Le Roman populaire
  - Romans pour tous
- Le Livre de Poche Tallandier
- Lisez-moi – Historia
- Le Lynx
- L'Œil de la police
- Panorama de la Guerre
- Romans célèbres et drames d'amour
- Le Roman du dimanche
- Les Romans héroïques
- Les Romans mystérieux (1910–1950)
- La Science illustrée (1900–1905)
- Les Sept Couleurs
- Texto, le goût de l'Histoire
- Voyages lointains et aventures étranges (1927–1932)

== Bibliography ==
- Molier, Jean-Yves; Letourneux, Matthieu (2011). La Librairie Tallandier : Histoire d'une grande maison d'édition populaire (1870–2000) [La Librairie Tallandier: History of a major publishing house (1870-2000)] (in French). Paris: Nouveau Monde. ISBN 978-2-84736-628-0.
