= Francis Lacassin =

French writer (1931–2008)

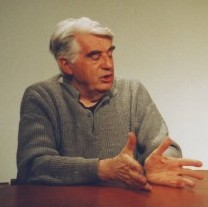
Francis Lacassin

Francis Lacassin (French: [lakasɛ̃]; 18 November 1931 – 12 August 2008) was a French journalist, editor, writer, screenplay writer and essayist.

== Biography ==
Lacassin started to work for the Jean-Jacques Pauvert's magazine Bizarre in 1964. He was writing about fantastic and detective literature in Magazine Littéraire, worked for L'Express and for Le Point. He also was responsible of the Christian Bourgois collection 10/18.

Specialist of pop culture, he was member of a group which help comic books to be recognize and he coined the term "9th art". He wrote prefaces for reference editions of many authors and series for the Éditions Robert Laffont. He was responsible of the Bouquins collection since 1982. He worked on authors such as: Eugène Sue, Gustave Le Rouge, Maurice Leblanc, Fantômas, H. P. Lovecraft, and Jack London. That is why he was nicknamed "the man of thousand prefaces".

== Partial bibliography ==
=== Books ===
- La Société des Cinéromans (1918–1930)
- Tarzan ou le Chevalier crispé (Union générale d'éditions, 1971)
- Pour un neuvième art : la bande dessinée (Slatkine, 1971)
- Sous le masque de Léo Malet : Nestor Burma (Encrage, 1993)
- Pour une contre-histoire du cinéma (Union générale d'éditions, 1994)
- Alfred Machin : de la jungle à l'écran (Dreamland, 2001)
- Collab. with Patrice Gauthier, Louis Feuillade : Maître du cinéma populaire, coll. "Découvertes Gallimard" (nº 486), (Gallimard, 2006, ISBN 2070319261)
- Sur les chemins qui marchent (mémoires de l'auteur) (Éd. du Rocher, 2006, ISBN 978-2268059891)

=== Articles ===
- «Louis Feuillade» in Anthologie du Cinéma, vol. 2 (Éditions de l'Avant-Scène, 1967)
- Critique of the book "Family Without a Name" by F. Lacassin (work by Jules Verne)
- Preface of the book "Les Naufragés du « Jonathan »" by F. Lacassin, work by Jules Verne, adapted by his son, Michel Verne
