= The Lightning Wheel =

1908 novel by Jean de La Hire

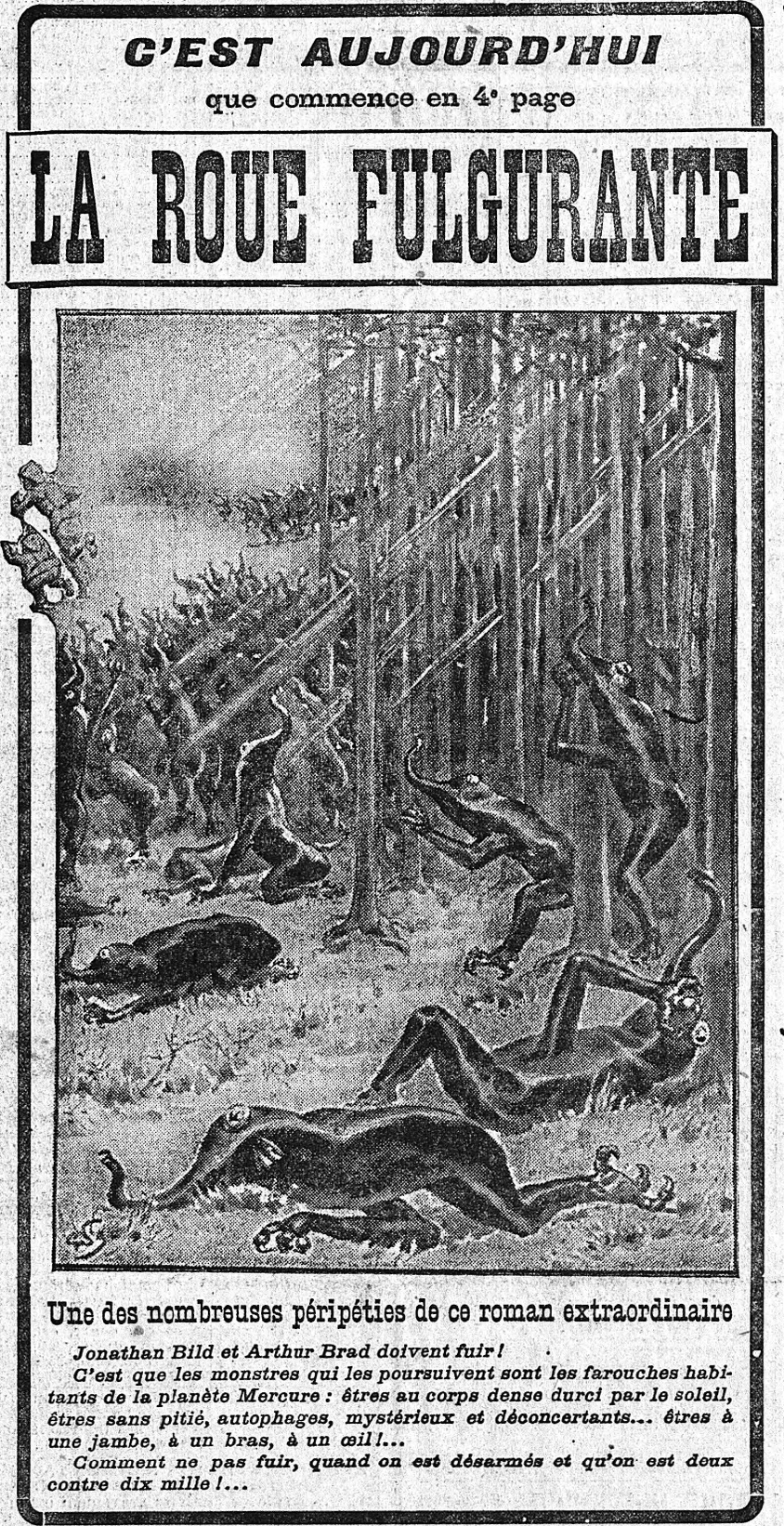
Illustration from original publication

The Fiery Wheel (original title La Roue fulgurante) is a 1908 science fiction book by Jean de La Hire. It was originally serialized of publication in daily newspaper Le Matin.

== Plot ==
Five humans are abducted by a spaceship and transported to the planet Mercury. There they must face a cannibalistic species of aliens. On Earth, there is an attempt to save them using psychic powers.

== Influence ==
After the novel's success, Le Matin gave La Hire an exclusive contract.

Bertrand Méheust, a French sociologist, began a study of the science fiction parallels to UFO mythology when he stumbled upon a copy of the novel in his family's attic. He opened it and began reading how the central characters find themselves being lifted up by a ray into a flying disc that hums and glows with a halo of light.

== Translation ==
In 2013 the original french novel was adapted to English by Brian Stableford and published by Black Coat Press. The novel had previously been called The Lightning Wheel in english, but is now known as The Fiery Wheel.

== See also ==
- Alien abduction
- Science fiction
- UFO
