= Michel Ragon =

French art historian (1924–2020)

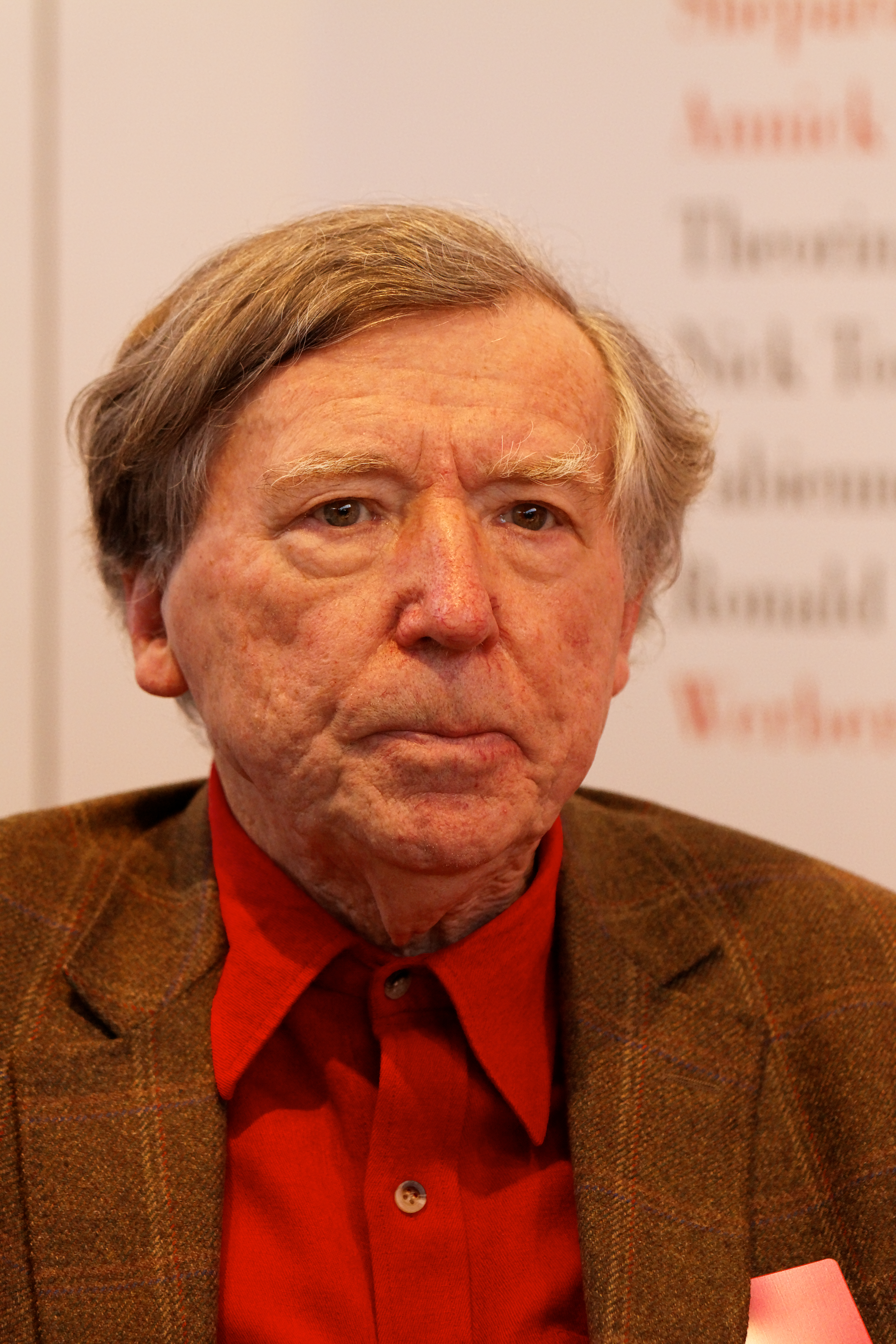
- Michel Rogan at the Salon du livre de Paris, 2011
- Born: 24 June 1924; Marseille, France
- Died: 14 February 2020 (aged 95); Suresnes, France
- Occupations: Writer; Art critic

Michel Ragon (24 June 1924 – 14 February 2020) was a French art and literature critic and writer. His primary focus was on anarchic and libertarian literature.

== Biography ==
Ragon was born into a poor family on 24 June 1924 in Marseille, but spent much of his childhood in Fontenay-le-Comte. After his father died when he was eight, Ragon moved to Nantes with his mother. Here, he discovered the works of Victor Hugo, Jean-Jacques Rousseau, Jules Verne, Andre Gide, and others. He discovered a passion for arts at the Musée d'Arts de Nantes, as well as classical music at the Théâtre Graslin. In 1943, at age 19, Ragon met the poets of the École de Rochefort, such as Jean Bouhier and René-Guy Cadou, as well as painter James Guitet. Due to his writings, he was wanted by the Gestapo, but escaped before he was to be captured. He returned to Nantes in 1944, but left for Paris the following year.

It was in Paris where Ragon became a renowned modern art and literature critic. He would often travel, writing reports for the World Health Organization. He also curated exhibitions, such as the 1967 São Paulo Art Biennial and the 1968 Venice Biennale. He would give lectures at the Ministry of Europe and Foreign Affairs, thanks to André Malraux, and directed collections at Casterman.

Ragon was a visiting professor at the Université de Montréal in 1970, even though he only had his Certificat d'études primaires. Afterwards, he became a professor at the École nationale supérieure des arts décoratifs in Paris. He earned a doctorate at Sorbonne University in 1975 after not taking a single course for 50 years. He retired in 1985.

Michel Ragon died on 14 February 2020 at the age of 95.

== Publications ==
=== Poetry ===
- Prière pour un temps de calamité (1945)
- Au matin de la mer (1945)
- Deux poèmes (1948)
- Un poème (1949)
- Feux de camps (1950)
- Cosmopolites (1954)
- La Peau des Choses (1968)

=== Novels ===
- Drôles de métiers (1953)
- Drôles de Voyages (1954)
- Une place au soleil (1955)
- Trompe-l'œil (1956)
- Les Américains (1959)
- Le Jeu de Dames (1960)
- Les Quatre Murs (1966)
- Nous sommes 17 sous une lune très petite (1968)
- L'Accent de ma mère (1980)
- Ma sœur aux yeux d'Asie (1984)
- Les Mouchoirs rouges de Cholet (1984)
- La Louve de Mervent (1985)
- Le Marin des Sables (1987)
- L'Accent de ma mère (1989)
- La Mémoire des vaincus (1990)
- Le Cocher du Boiroux (1992)
- Le Roman de Rabelais (1994)
- Les coquelicots sont revenus (1996)
- Un si bel espoir (1999)
- Georges & Louise (2000)
- Un rossignol chantait (2001)
- Un amour de Jeanne (2003)
- La Ferme d'en haut (2005)
- Les Livres de ma terre (2005)
- Le Prisonnier (2007)

=== On Libertarianism ===
- Les Écrivains du peuple (1947)
- Histoire de la littérature ouvrière (1953)
- Karl Marx (1959)
- Histoire de la littérature prolétarienne en France (1974)
- Bernard Clavel (1975)
- Ils ont semé nos libertés. Cent ans de droits syndicaux (1984)
- La Voie libertaire (1991)
- 1793. L'insurrection vendéenne et les malentendus de la liberté (1992)
- Dictionnaire de l'Anarchie (2008)
- Ils se croyaient illustres et immortels… (2011)

=== Travel Stories ===
- L'Honorable Japon (1959)
- J'ai vu vivre l'Angleterre (1960)
- Milan, un guide intime (1987)

=== Interviews ===
- Enfances vendéennes (1990)
- J'en ai connu des équipages (1991)
- Ma Vendée (1994)
- D'une berge à l'autre (1999)

=== Art Critiques ===
- Expression et non-figuration (1951)
- L’Aventure de l'art abstrait (1956)
- La Peinture actuelle (1959)
- L’Encyclopédie des arts (1962)
- Nouvelle figuration II - Enrico Baj, John Christoforou, John Hultberg, Bengt Lindström, Jean Messagier, Irving Petlin, Marcel Pouget, Paul Rebeyrolle (1962)
- Naissance d'un art nouveau (1963)
- Encyclopédie de poche : peinture, sculpture, architecture (1963)
- Les Grands Peintres racontés par eux-mêmes et par leurs témoins (1965)
- Univers des Arts (1965)
- L’Expressionnisme (1966)
- 34-39, L'avant-guerre (1968)
- 25 ans d'art vivant 1944-1969 (1969)
- L’Art pour quoi faire ? (1971)
- L’Art abstrait (1973)
- L’Art abstrait (1974)
- Peinture moderne et peinture contemporaine (1974)
- 25 ans d'art vivant : chronique vécue de l'art contemporain de l'abstraction au pop art, 1944-1969 (1986)
- Selection One : VIII : Expressionnisme, couleur et passion (1987)
- Les Années 1950 (1988)
- L’Art abstrait (1988)
- Journal de l'art abstrait (1992)
- Du côté de l'art brut (1996)
- Le Regard et la mémoire (1997)
- 50 ans d'art vivant : chronique vécue de la peinture et de la sculpture, 1950-2000 (2001)
- Les Années 1950-1960 : Gildas fardel, un collectionneur d'art abstrait (2008)
- Le Journal d’un critique d’art désabusé (2013)

=== Architecture Critiques ===
- L’Architecte et le Magicien (1951)
- Le Livre de l'architecture moderne (1958)
- Où vivrons-nous demain ? (1963)
- L'Urbanisme et la cité (1964)
- Les Visionnaires de l'architecture (1965)
- Paris, hier, aujourd'hui, demain (1965)
- Les Cités de l'avenir (1966)
- La Cité de l'an 2000 (1968)
- Esthétique de l'architecture contemporaine (1968)
- Les Erreurs monumentales (1971)
- Idéologies et pionniers (1971)
- Pratiques et méthodes, 1911-1985 (1972)
- L'Homme et les villes (1975)
- L'architecture, le prince et la démocratie (Vers une démocratisation de l'architecture ?) (1977)
- Prospective et futurologie (1978)
- L'espace de la mort : essai sur l'architecture, la décoration et l'urbanisme funéraire (1981)
- Claude Parent, monographie critique d'un architecte (1982)
- L'Architecture des gares : naissance, apogée et déclin des gares de chemins de fer (1984)
- Goldberg : dans la ville - in the city (1985)
- Histoire mondiale de l'architecture et de l'urbanisme modernes (1986)
- Histoire de l'architecture et de l'urbanisme modernes (1991)
- C'est quoi, l'architecture ? (1991)
- Xavier Zevaco (1999)
- Paris, paysages (2008)

=== Humorous Drawings ===
- Le Dessin d'humour (1960)
- Les Maîtres du dessin satirique (1972)
- Le Dessin d'humour, Histoire de la caricature et du dessin satirique en France (1992)

=== Monographs ===
- Jean-Michel Atlan (1950)
- Ejler Bille (1950)
- Poliakoff (1956)
- Fautrier (1957)
- Dubuffet (1958)
- Martin Barré (1960)
- Jean-Michel Atlan (1960)
- Zoltan Kemeny (1960)
- Introduction à la peinture de James Guitet (1960)
- Marino di Teana (1961)
- James Guitet et le naturalisme abstrait (1962)
- Jean-Michel Atlan (1962)
- Pierre Soulages (1962)
- Les rêveries de la matière (1965)
- Alexander Calder (1967)
- John-Franklin Koenig (1969)
- Etienne-Martin (1970)
- James Guitet, les forces du silence (1973?)
- Marta Pan (1974)
- 54 mots-clés pour une lecture polyphonique d'Agam (1965)
- Gustave Courbet (1980)
- Karel Appel, peinture 1937-1957 (1988)
- Karel Appel, de Cobra, à un art autre, 1948-1957 (1988)
- Jean-Michel Atlan, mon ami, 1948-1960 (1989)
- Jean Dubuffet, paysages du mental : Regards sur l'œuvre d'un philosophe (1989)
- Les ateliers de Soulages (1990)
- Corneille toujours en route (1990)
- Jean Dubuffet (1995)
- Gérard Schneider (1998)
- Pierre Soulages, peintures sur papier
- Picassiette (2001)
- Gustave Courbet, peintre de la liberté (2004)

=== Articles ===
- L'ami (1994)

== Tributes ==
- In June 2010, a collection at the Institut national d'histoire de l'art exhibited "Michel Ragon, critic of art and architecture". A publication of this event was produced in 2013, now on display at the Cité de l'architecture et du patrimoine.
- The exposition "Villes visionnaires-hommage à Michel Ragon", on display at the FRAC Centre in 2014 and 2015, showed Ragon's "forward-looking" town planning.
