= Gustave Le Rouge =

French writer (1867–1938)

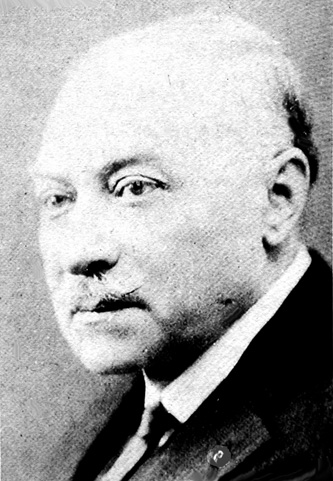
Gustave Le Rouge.

Gustave Henri Joseph Le Rouge (22 July 1867 – 24 February 1938) was a French writer who embodied the evolution of modern science fiction at the beginning of the 20th century, by moving it away from the juvenile adventures of Jules Verne and incorporating real people into his stories, thus bridging the gap between Vernian and Wellsian science fiction.

== Biography ==
Le Rouge was born at Valognes, Manche.

Le Rouge burst onto the literary scene with La Conspiration des Milliardaires [The Billionaires' Conspiracy] (1899-1900), co-written with Gustave Guitton, in which American billionaire William Boltyn uses Thomas Edison's "Metal Men" (Karel Čapek coined the term "robot" only in 1920) and the power of mediums to try to become master of the world. Le Rouge and Guitton went on to produce two more novels in the same vein, La princesse des airs [The Princess of the Skies] (1902) and Le sous-marin Jules Verne [The Submarine Jules Verne] (1903).

After the pair quarreled and went their separate ways, Le Rouge continued to produce solo fiction such as L'Espionne du Grand Lama (1906), which introduced a Lost World inhabited by prehistoric creatures and La Reine des Éléphants [The Queen of Elephants] (1906), which featured a society of intelligent elephants.

Sandwiched between Arnould Galopin's Doctor Omega (1906) and Edgar Rice Burroughs' A Princess of Mars (1912), Le Rouge's masterpiece was Le Prisonnier de la planète Mars (1908) and its sequel, La Guerre des Vampires (1909), a Martian Odyssey in which French engineer Robert Darvel is dispatched to Mars by the psychic powers of Hindu Brahmins. On the Red Planet, Darvel runs afoul of hostile, bat-winged, blood-sucking natives, a once-powerful civilization now ruled by the Great Brain. The entity eventually sends Darvel back to Earth, unfortunately with some of the vampires. The second volume deals with the war of the vampires back on Earth. Le Rouge's Mars is elaborately described, with its fauna, flora and various races of inhabitants, à la C. S. Lewis' Out of the Silent Planet (1938). Planetary romance blends with "cosmic horror" as the characters switch from swashbuckling he-men to helpless bundles of gibbering terror.

In 1907, Le Rouge first made the acquaintance of the Swiss poet Blaise Cendrars, who later painted an affectionately colorful portrait of him in his memoir L’homme foudroyé (1945).

Le Rouge's classic mad scientist / conspiracy saga is Le Mystérieux Docteur Cornelius (1912–13). Cornelius Kramm and his brother, Fritz, rule an international criminal empire called the Red Hand. Cornelius is a brilliant cosmetic surgeon nicknamed the "Sculptor of Human Flesh" for his ability to alter people's likenesses. The Red Hand's growing, global, evil influence eventually causes the creation of an alliance of heroes, led by Dr. Prosper Bondonnat, billionaire William Dorgan and Lord Burydan, who band together to fight and, ultimately, defeat them.

During World War I, Le Rouge became a war correspondent for various magazines, eventually settling into a long-term position with Le Petit Parisien. He continued to produce books of various sorts, including some pioneering exercises in spy fiction and some detective fiction throughout the 1920s and early 1930s, but none of his later works made any considerable impact.

== Translated works ==
- The Dominion of the World (4 volumes, 2012) translated by Brian Stableford (La Conspiration des Milliardaires (1899-1900) by Gustave Le Rouge & Gustave Guitton) ISBN 978-1-61227-095-1, 978-1-61227-096-8, 978-1-61227-097-5 and 978-1-61227-098-2
- The Mysterious Doctor Cornelius (3 volumes, 2014) translated by Brian Stableford (1912-1913) ISBN 978-1-61227-243-6, 978-1-61227-244-3 and 978-1-61227-245-0
- The Vampires of Mars (2008) translated by Brian Stableford (Le Prisonnier de la Planète Mars and La Guerre des Vampires by Gustave Le Rouge (1908)) ISBN 978-1-934543-30-6
