= Jean de La Hire =

French author (1878–1956)

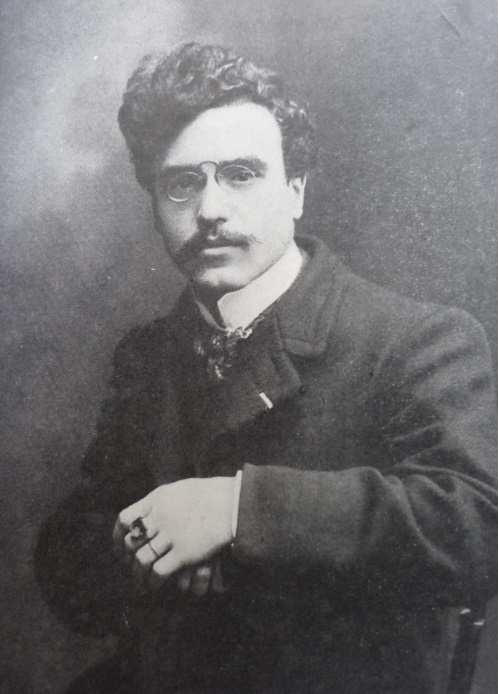
Jean de La Hire

Jean de La Hire (pseudonym of the Comte Adolphe-Ferdinand Celestin d'Espie de La Hire) (28 January 1878 – 5 September 1956) was a prolific French author of numerous popular adventure, science fiction and romance novels.

Adolphe d'Espie was born on 28 January 1878 in Banyuls-sur-Mer, Pyrénées-Orientales. He was a scion of an old French noble family dating back the reign of Saint Louis, which gave the ancient city of Toulouse a Capitoul during the Middle Ages. He was a soldier during World War I. He died during 1956 at Nice as a result of a congestion of the lungs due to chronic pulmonary problems from having been gassed during that war.

At the age of twenty, the only son of the last Comte d'Espie chose the pseudonym "Jean de la Hire", clearly indicating the admiration he dedicated to La Hire, legendary comrade of Joan of Arc, claiming to be his descendant. As numerous young ambitious provinciaux eagerly wanting literary fame and fortune, he migrated to Paris with the support of his uncle, the then already famous sculptor Aristide Maillol. But his debuts were not very successful and, after he was not awarded the Prix Goncourt, he abandoned classic literature and decided to author more popular novels of the roman populaire genre.

During his lifetime, he authored more than 300 novels and short-stories, some published with more than 100,000 issues, the most popular being his super-science works - and among them the Nyctalope series. Most of them - mainly in the dime novel style: detective novels, adventures, romances, western stories, etc. - were published as series in popular newspapers, magazines and quarterlies.

== Overview ==
Jean de La Hire is remembered nowadays mainly for having created one of the first literary superheroes of so-called pulp fiction: The Nyctalope, Leo Saint-Clair. A common mistake is to believe that The Nyctalope appeared first in L'Homme qui peut vivre dans l'eau (The Man Who Could Live Underwater) (1908). In fact, there is no Nyctalope in this book but a previous member of the Saint-Clair family, Jean, later identified in other books as Leo's father. The real Nyctalope appeared for the first time in Le Mystère des XV (1911) and continued to be published until the mid-1950s, when its books were reprinted by La Hire's son-in-law as rewritten editions.

The Nyctalope's adventures were of the science fiction style: In Le Mystère des XV (The Mystery Of The XV) (1911), Oxus tried to conquer the planet Mars. In Lucifer (1920), the villainous Glo von Warteck tried to command the world using "Omega Rays" to enslave mankind. In Le Roi de la nuit [The King Of The Night] (1923), the Nyctalope flew to Rhea, an unknown satellite of Earth.

La Hire was also the author of La Roue Fulgurante (The Fiery Wheel) (1908), a classic "space opera" in which five Earthmen are abducted in the eponymous "fiery wheel" (a flying saucer) and taken to Mercury by aliens who look like columns of light.

La Hire's other works included Le Corsaire sous-marin (The Underwater Corsair) (1912–13), a 79-issue feuilleton derivative of Jules Verne, Joe Rollon, l'autre homme invisible (Joe Rollon, The Other Invisible Man) (1919), a variation on H.G. Wells' story and Les Grandes Aventures d'un boy scout (The Great Adventures Of A Boy-Scout) (30 issues, 1926), a serial that features the adventures of boy scout Franc-Hardi in underground realms, other planets, etc.

In 1940 he published an anti-French and pro-Nazi volume, Le Crime des évacuations; Les Horreurs que nous avons vues, in which he praised the Nazis for their helpfulness to the French war refugees. During the German occupation of France, he joined the National Popular Rally (RNP) and the Groupe Collaboration. After World War II, in 1948, he was convicted of indignité nationale as a collaborator with Nazi Germany.

== Selected bibliography (excluding the Nyctalope) ==
- La Roue Fulgurante (The Fiery Wheel) (1908) (translated by Brian Stableford, ISBN 9781612272177, Black Coat Press, 2013)
- Le Corsaire Sous-Marin (The Underwater Corsair) (79 issues, 1912–13)
- Au-Delà des Ténèbres (Beyond Darkness) (1916)
- Joe Rollon, l'Autre Homme Invisible (Joe Rollon, The Other Invisible Man) (written under the pseudonym of Edmond Cazal) (1919)
- Le Labyrinthe Rouge (The Red Labyrinth) (1920)
- Raca (1922)
- La Prisonnière du Dragon Rouge (The Prisoner Of The Red Dragon) (1923)
- Les Dompteurs de Forces (The Tamers Of Forces) (1924)
- La Captive du Soleil d'Or (The Captive Of The Golden Sun) (1926)
- Les Grandes Aventures d'un Boy Scout (The Great Adventures Of A Boy-Scout) (30 issues, 1926)
- Le Zankador (1927)
- Les Aventures de Paul Ardent (The Adventures Of Paul Ardent) (6 issues, 1927–28)
- Les Ravageurs du Monde (The Ravagers Of The World) (1929)
- L'Oeil de la Déesse (The Eye Of The Goddess) (1929)
- Le Roi des Catacombes (The King Of The Catacombs) (1929)
- Les Hommes Sans Yeux [The Eyeless Men] (1930)
- Le Cercueil de Nacre (The Mother-Of-Pearl Coffin) (1930)
- Kaitar (1930)
- Les Amazones (1930)
- Le Fils du Soleil (The Son Of The Sun) (1931)
- Sous l'Oeil de Dieu (Under God's Eye) (1932)
- Les Chasseurs de Mystères (The Hunters Of Mysteries) (1933)
- Le Secret des Torelwoch (The Secret Of Torelwoch) (1934)
- Le Maître du Monde (The Master Of The World) (1934)
- Le Regard Qui Tue (The Killing Eyes) (1934)
- La Mort de Sardanapale (1935)
- L'Énigme de l'Oeil Sanglant (The Mystery Of The Bloody Eye) (1935)
- Le Volcan Artificiel (The Artificial Volcano) (1936)
- Le Mort-Vivant (The Living Dead) (1936)
- L'Antre aux Cent Démons (The Lair Of A Hundred Demons) (1935)
- Les Envoûtées (The Spellbound) (1935)
- Le Démon de la Nuit (The Night Demon) (1937)
- Le Million des Scouts (22 issues, 1937–38)
- La Guerre! La Guerre! (War! War!) (written as Commandant Cazal) (5 issues, 1939)
