= Ricardo Herz =

Brazilian musician (born 1978)

Ricardo Herz (born 1978) is a violinist from São Paulo, Brazil.

Ricardo Steuer Herz is a classically trained musician, and also received training in jazz from the Berklee College of Music in Boston. In France, he studied with Didier Lockwood, after finishing his studies, regularly conducted workshops on Brazilian music. Back home in Brazil, Herz won the popular jury at Visa Prize for Brazilian Music in 2004. Since then, he released his first solo album, Violino Popular Brasileiro (Brazilian Popular Violin) and has performed with artists such as Yamandu Costa, Hamilton de Holanda, Nelson Ayres, Toninho Ferragutti and Dominguinhos.

From 2002 to 2010, Ricardo lived in Paris. Aside from his solo work, he performed with the groups Orquestra do Fubá and Tekere. Orquestra do Fubá is a forró band made up of young, dynamic French and Brazilian musicians. Since 2005, they have been in France's summer festivals, including Jazz à Vienne, Jazz à Marciac, Bout du Monde Festival, among others. Tekere is a jazz/world-music sextet composed by three Brazilian and three French musicians.

Since returning to Brazil in 2010, Herz has performed in musical collaborations with musicians in Brazil, such as Yamandú Costa, Dominguinhos, Nelson Ayres, Proveta, and Fábio Peron, and as a soloist with a wide variety of orchestras, including Orquestra Jazz Sinfônica, Orquestra Sinfônica de João Pessoa, Orquestra Municipal de Jundiaí, Projeto Guri, Orquestra Filarmônica de Violas, and Orquestra Breusil.

With his Ricardo Herz Trio, he has recorded two albums, Aqui é o meu lá and Torcendo a Terra, both with a more jazzistic take on Brazilian rhythms.

Herz has recorded a number of duo albums: with vibraphonist/composer Antonio Loureiro, accordionist Samuca do Acordeon, and pianist/arranger/conductor Nelson Ayres, and, most recently, virtuoso guitarist Yamandú Costa. He has also released an album with traditional music for kids and performed this repertoire with the Cantilena Ensemble.

Herz is also a teacher and promoter of Brazilian violin.
