= Paul Nadar =

French photographer (1856–1939)

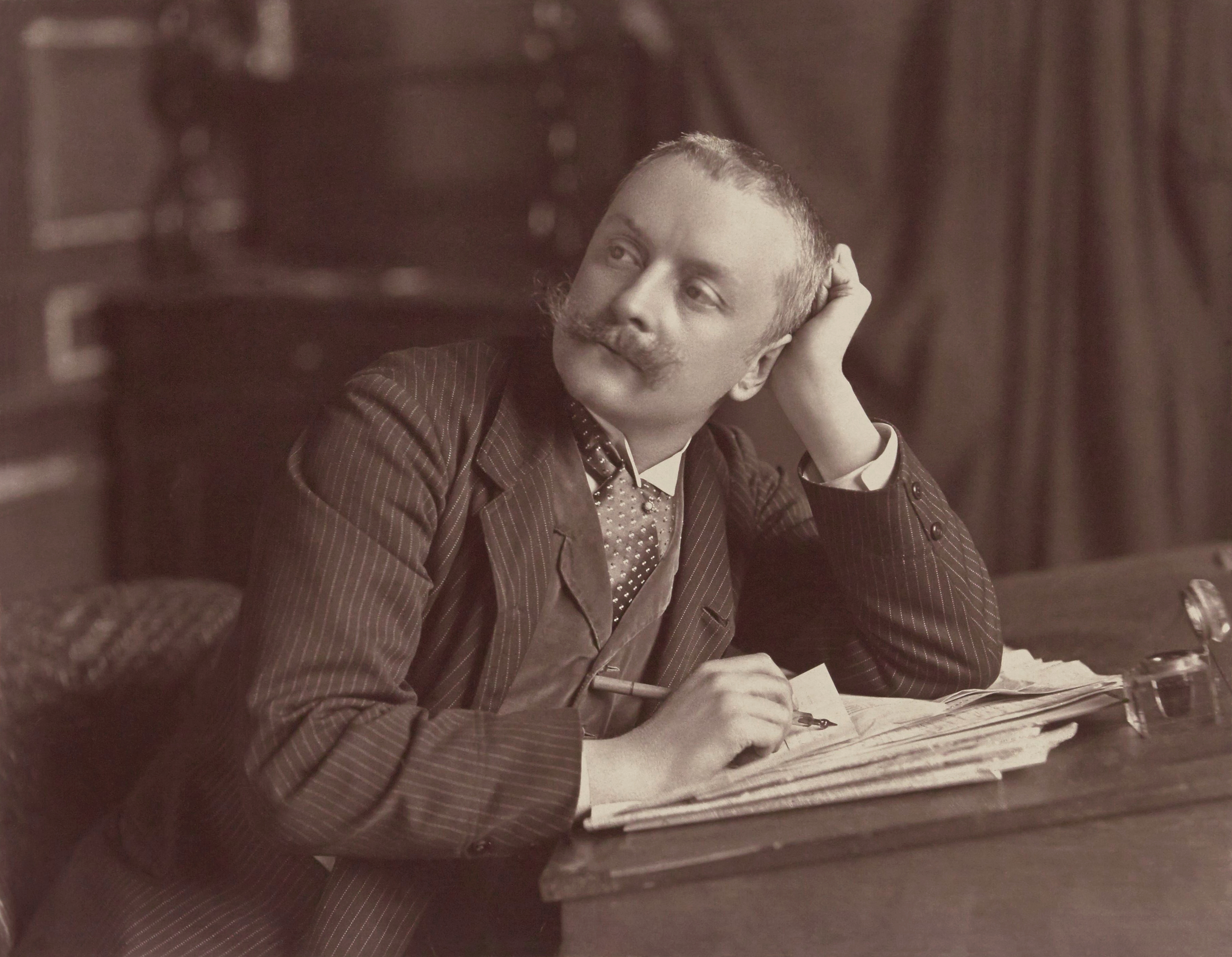
- Self-portrait, 1894
- Born: 8 February 1856; Paris, France
- Died: 1 September 1939 (aged 83); Paris, France
- Occupation: Photographer
- Father: Nadar
- Relatives: Victor Tournachon (grandfather)

Paul Nadar (8 February 1856 – 1 September 1939) was a French photographer and the son of Nadar, who was also a photographer, and the grandson of Victor Tournachon, who was a printer and bookseller.

== Life ==
Nadar was born on 8 February 1856 in Paris. He was appointed by his father to be manager of the latter's studio in Paris 1874. The two men had a difficult relationship, being estranged for a period, but later collaborated on the world's first photo interview – Nadar senior conducting the interview while Paul took photographs — of Michel-Eugène Chevreul.

As of 1 April 1895, his father turned over the Paris Nadar Studio to Paul. His father moved to Marseille, returning to Paris 3 January 1909.

The older Nadar died on 20 March 1910, aged 89. The studio continued under the direction of Paul Nadar. Paul died on 1 September 1939 in Paris.

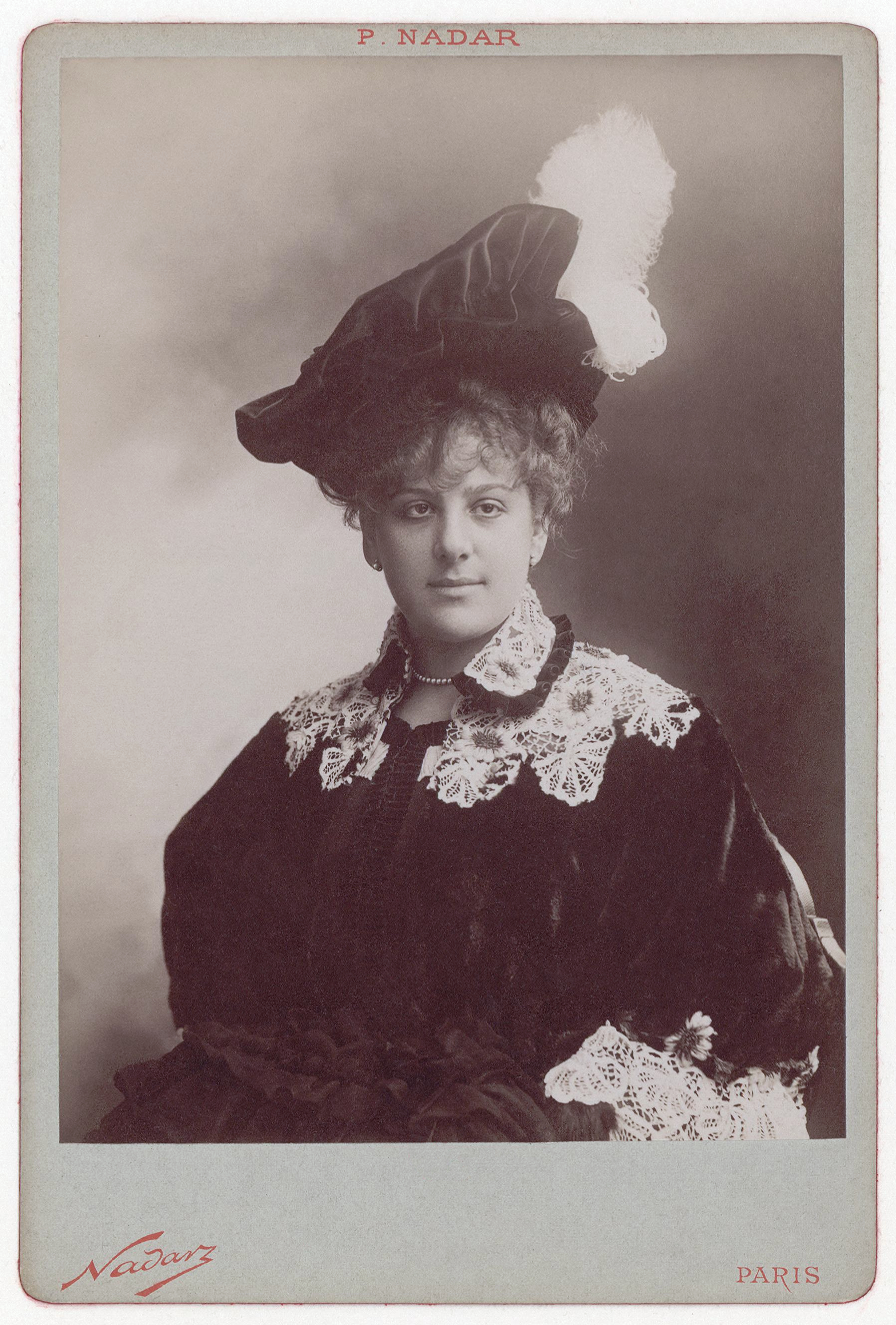
Photograph of Lucy Arbell by Paul Nadar, c. 1909
