= Jean Laforgue =

Jean Laforgue (11 January 1782, Marciac – 6 November 1852, Dresden) was a French scholar living in Dresden, mainly known for having edited and censored the first edition (known as Édition Laforgue) of Giacomo Casanova's memoirs, Histoire de ma vie.

== Biography ==
Jean Laforgue was born in Marciac, in the Gers department in southwestern France, on 11 January 1782. From 1822 to 1827, he was a French language teacher in Dresden Ritter-Akademie (Dresden knight academy).

In 1825, he was given the task of preparing the first French edition of Casanova's memoirs by the publisher Friedrich Arnold Brockhaus.

His translation is heavily criticized today not only for having made a lot of changes to the original manuscript, but also for its dull literary style.

In approximately 1831, Laforgue gave back the manuscript to Brockhaus, without four chapters whose fate remains unknown as of today.

After 1831, he resumed giving French lessons at the Dresden Ritter-Akademie.

== Laforgue rewritings of Casanova's manuscript ==
Laforgue not only modernized the orthography of words and nouns, but also rewrote the most part of the original text in what he considered to be a better French. He also watered down passages he judged licentious, or to the contrary rewrote those he considered too elliptic. Furthermore, he added or cut entire passages from the text, depending on his own convictions. He judged Casanova's original text too favorable to Christianity and Ancien Régime, and too hostile to the French Revolution and democracy.

For example:

- Je baise l’air, croyant que tu y es (I kiss the air, thinking you are there) becomes Je lance mille baisers qui se perdent dans l’air (I give a thousand kisses that get lost to the air)
- Sûr d’une pleine jouissance à la fin du jour, je me livrai à toute ma gaieté naturelle (certain to make love at the end of the day, I engaged in my natural cheerfulness) becomes Certain d'être heureux (Certain to be happy)

== Bibliography ==
- Antoine-Alexandre Barbier, Joseph-Marie Quérard, et al., Dictionnaire des ouvrages anonymes, éd. Féchoz et Letouzey, 1889, p. 152
- Giacomo Casanova, Mémoires de J. Casanova de Seingalt, ed. Garnier Frères, [1880], t. I, « Notice » from Garnier, p. III
- Giacomo Casanova, Histoire de ma vie, ed. Robert Laffont, coll. Bouquins, 1993, t. I, introduction by Francis Lacassin, p. II, and « Biographie d'un manuscrit » from Helmut Watzlawick, p. XXIV
- Ted Emery, Casanova Research Page, Dickinson College, Department of French and Italian, reprinted as « The History of Casanova's Manuscripts at Dux »
- Philippe Monnier, Venise au XVIII siècle, ed. Complexe, 2001, p. 272
- Pages casanoviennes, n° 3, 1925, p. 86

== See also ==
- Histoire de ma vie
