= Marciac =

- Commune
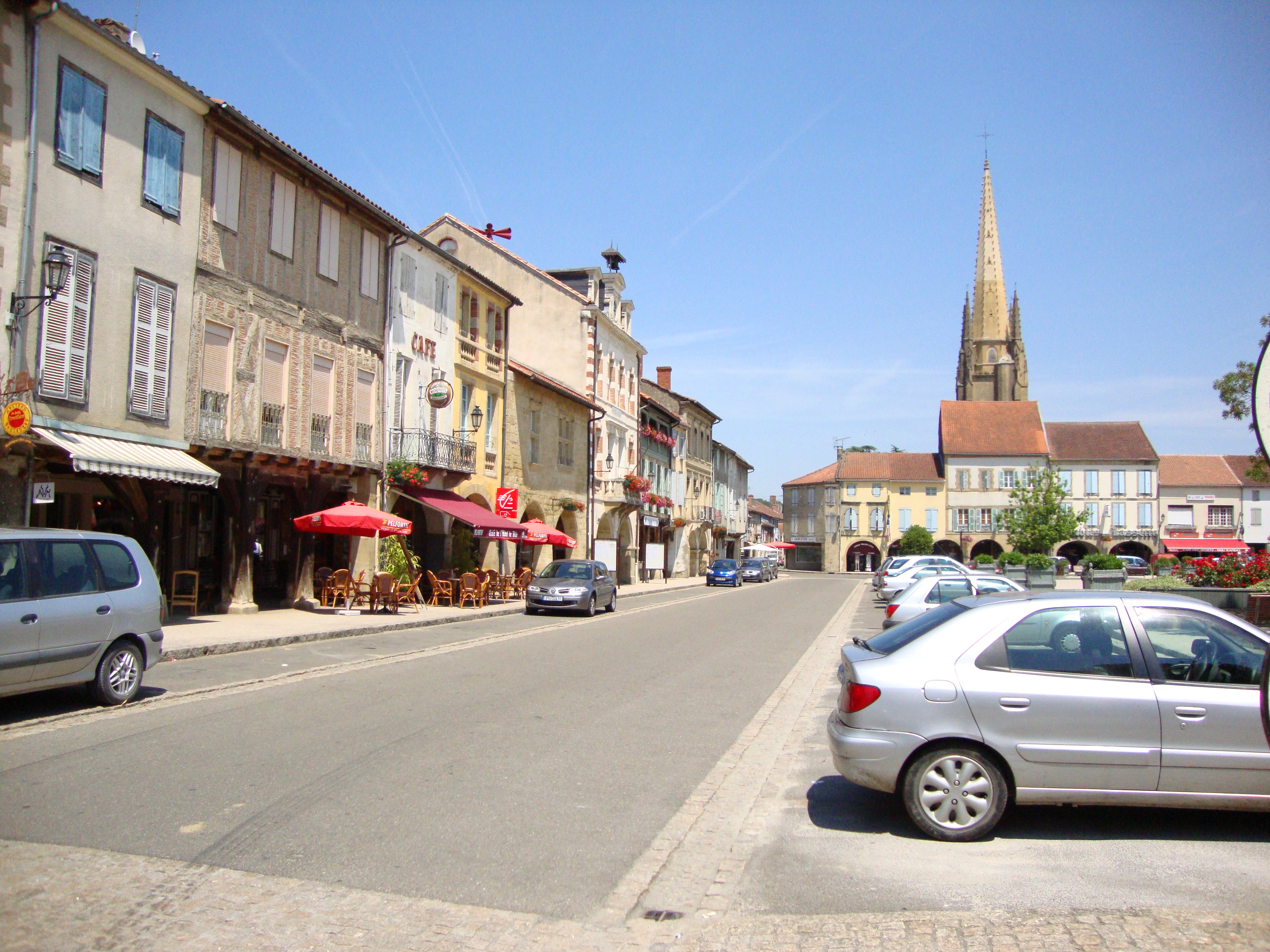
- The central square, with the bell tower of the church in the background

- Coat of arms
- Location of Marciac
- Location within France Location within Occitanie
- Coordinates: 43°31′30″N 0°09′45″E
- Country: France
- Region: Occitania
- Department: Gers
- Arrondissement: Mirande
- Canton: Pardiac-Rivière-Basse
- Intercommunality: Bastides et Vallons du Gers

Government
  - Mayor (2020–2026): Jean-Louis Guilhaumon
- Area^{1}: 20.6 km^{2} (8.0 sq mi)
- Elevation: 154 m (505 ft)
- Highest elevation: 247 m (810 ft)
- Lowest elevation: 142 m (466 ft)
- Population (2023): 1,213
  - Density: 58.9/km^{2} (153/sq mi)
- Time zone: UTC+01:00 (CET)
  - Summer (DST): UTC+02:00 (CEST)
- INSEE/Postal code: 32233 /32230
- ^{1} French Land Register data, which excludes lakes, ponds, glaciers > 1 km^{2} (0.386 sq mi or 247 acres) and river estuaries.

Marciac (/ˈmɑːrsiæk/, French: [maʁsjak], Occitan: [maɾˈsjak]) is a commune in the Gers department, Occitania, southwestern France. It is known for its annual international festival Jazz in Marciac, which runs for a fortnight every summer.

== Geography ==
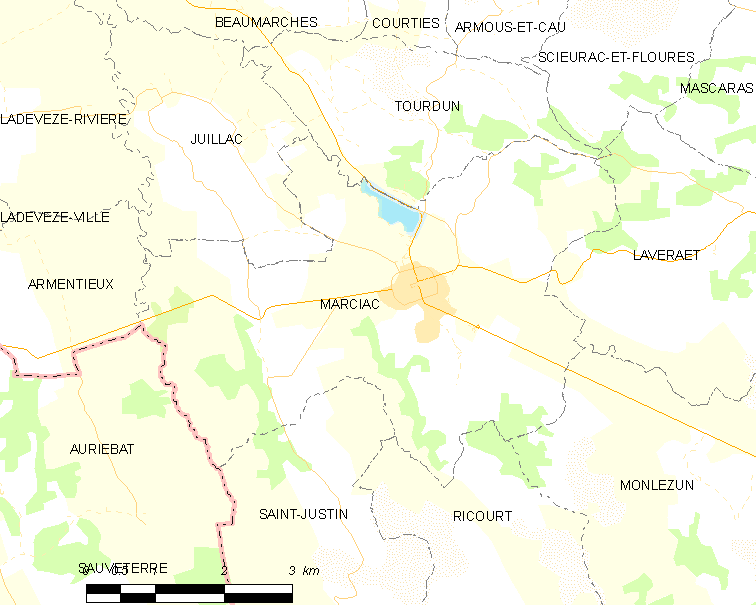
Marciac and its surrounding communes

== History ==
The name of this Bastide was received by the King of France's representative, seneschal Guichard de Marciac. The abbot of the monastery of La Case Dieu and the count of Pardiac had invited Guichard de Marciac with the hope he would ensure a safe place for Marciac's citizens and guarantee the prosperity of the city for years to come.

In 2008 a team from Marciac won the 'best baguette' category in the French-hosted (but United States-sponsored) baking world cup, the Coupe du Monde de la Boulangerie.

== Population ==
Historical population
Year	Pop.	±% p.a.
1968	1,065	—
1975	1,131	+0.86%
1982	1,119	−0.15%
1990	1,211	+0.99%
1999	1,160	−0.48%
2007	1,233	+0.77%
2012	1,243	+0.16%
2017	1,224	−0.31%
2023	1,213	−0.15%
Source: INSEE

== Festivals ==
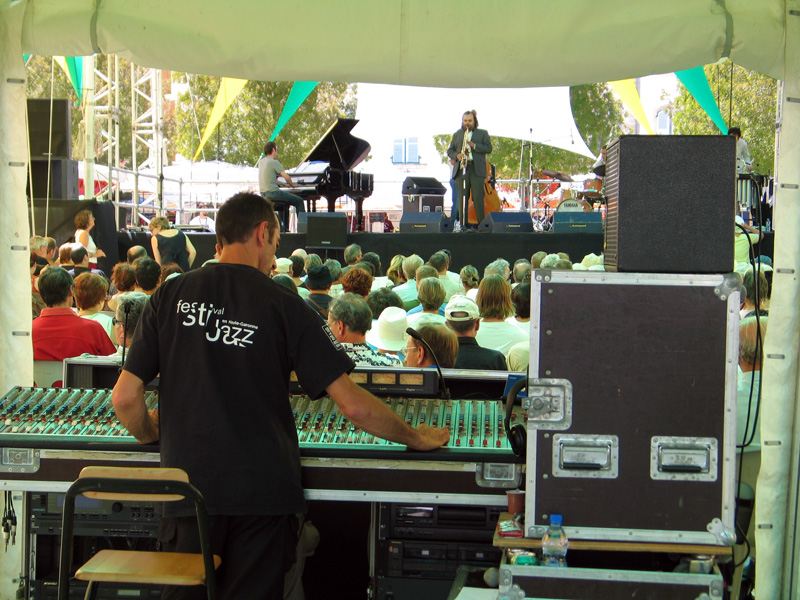
Jazz in Marciac 2005

A great emphasis is placed on jazz in the town, which is taught as a regular subject in local schools. The town itself is known for its annual Jazz in Marciac festival, held for a fortnight in August. A marquee ("le chapiteau") capable of seating 6,000 is erected on the rugby field, with concerts hosted there every night for the duration of the festival, and free music from 11:00 till 20:00 every day. Stalls selling a variety of related and non-related merchandise are erected in and around the centre of the village square, where free concerts are given during the day. Other musical events take place around the town at the same time, such as the "Atelier de Jazz".

== Economy ==
- Agriculture: sunflower, maize

== Notable people ==
- Jean Laforgue, born in Marciac in 1782, is mainly known for having edited and censored the first edition (known as Edition Laforgue) of Giacomo Casanova's memoirs, Histoire de ma vie.

== Sites of interest ==
The town is characteristic of the bastides in the area – central village square with the town hall a main feature, with the village shops clustered along the four sides of the square. Wide arched pavements allow dining out of doors in the summer, when music is piped around the square. The town convent (now the town hall and cinema) and church steeples are lit up at night. The town is also home to many restaurants, including "Le Monde A L'Envers" (The World Upside Down), run by London chef Victoria Heath. A reference book ("The fabulous destiny of Marciac: From the dream of the founders to the passion for jazz") displays (in French) the story of the city, from its foundation in 1298 to the birth and the development of its famous jazz festival.

== See also ==
- Communes of the Gers department
