= Victor Tournachon =

French printer and bookseller (1771–1837)

Victor Tournachon-Molin
- Born: 13 October 1771
- Died: 8 August 1837 (aged 65)
- Occupations: Printer, bookseller
- Children: Nadar

Victor Tournachon-Molin (13 October 1771 – 8 August 1837) was a French printer and bookseller. He was the father of the photographer Nadar. He was also the first French printer to publish the translation of Giacomo Casanova's masterpiece, Histoire de ma vie, from 1825 to 1829.

== Translation of Histoire de ma vie ==
After the success of the first German edition of Casanova's memoirs, Victor Tournachon edited a pirate edition, without access to the original manuscript. This first French edition was a German to French translation from the French to German Schütz translation, which results in a very approximate and imperfect text.

== See also ==
- Histoire de ma vie
