= Nadar =

French photographer and balloonist (1820–1910)

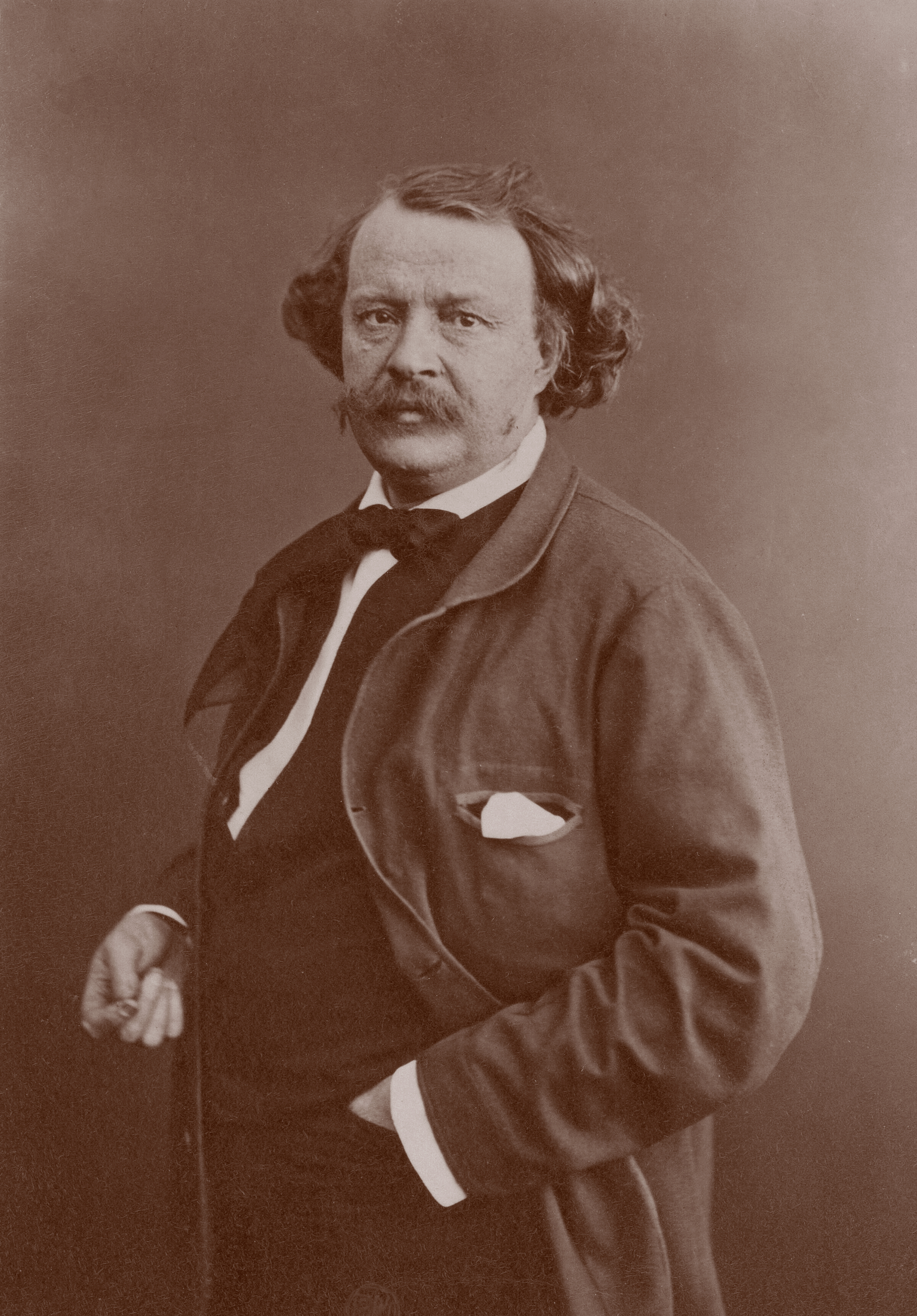
- Self-portrait, c. 1860
- Born: Gaspard-Félix Tournachon; 5 April 1820; Paris, France
- Died: 20 March 1910 (aged 89); Paris, France
- Resting place: Père Lachaise Cemetery; 48.860°N 2.396°E
- Occupations: Photographer; caricaturist; journalist; novelist; balloonist
- Known for: Pioneer in photography
- Children: Paul Nadar
- Father: Victor Tournachon

Gaspard-Félix Tournachon (French: [ɡaspaʁ feliks tuʁnaʃɔ̃]; 5 April 1820 – 20 March 1910), known by the pseudonym Nadar (French: [nadaʁ]) or Félix Nadar, was a French photographer, caricaturist, journalist, novelist and balloonist who was a proponent of heavier-than-air flight. In 1858, he became the first person to take aerial photographs. Photographic portraits by Nadar are held by many of the great national collections of photographs. His son, Paul Nadar, continued the studio after his death.

== Life ==
Gaspard-Félix Tournachon (also known as Nadar) was born in early April 1820 in Paris, though some sources state he was born in Lyon. His father, Victor Tournachon, was a printer and bookseller. Nadar began to study medicine but quit for economic reasons after his father's death.

Nadar started working as a caricaturist and novelist for various newspapers. He fell in with the Parisian bohemian group of Gérard de Nerval, Charles Baudelaire, and Théodore de Banville. His friends picked a nickname for him, perhaps by a playful habit of adding "dar" to the end of words, Tournadar, which later became Nadar. His work was published in Le Charivari for the first time in 1848. In 1849, he founded La Revue Comique à l'Usage des Gens Sérieux. He also edited Le Petit Journal pour Rire.

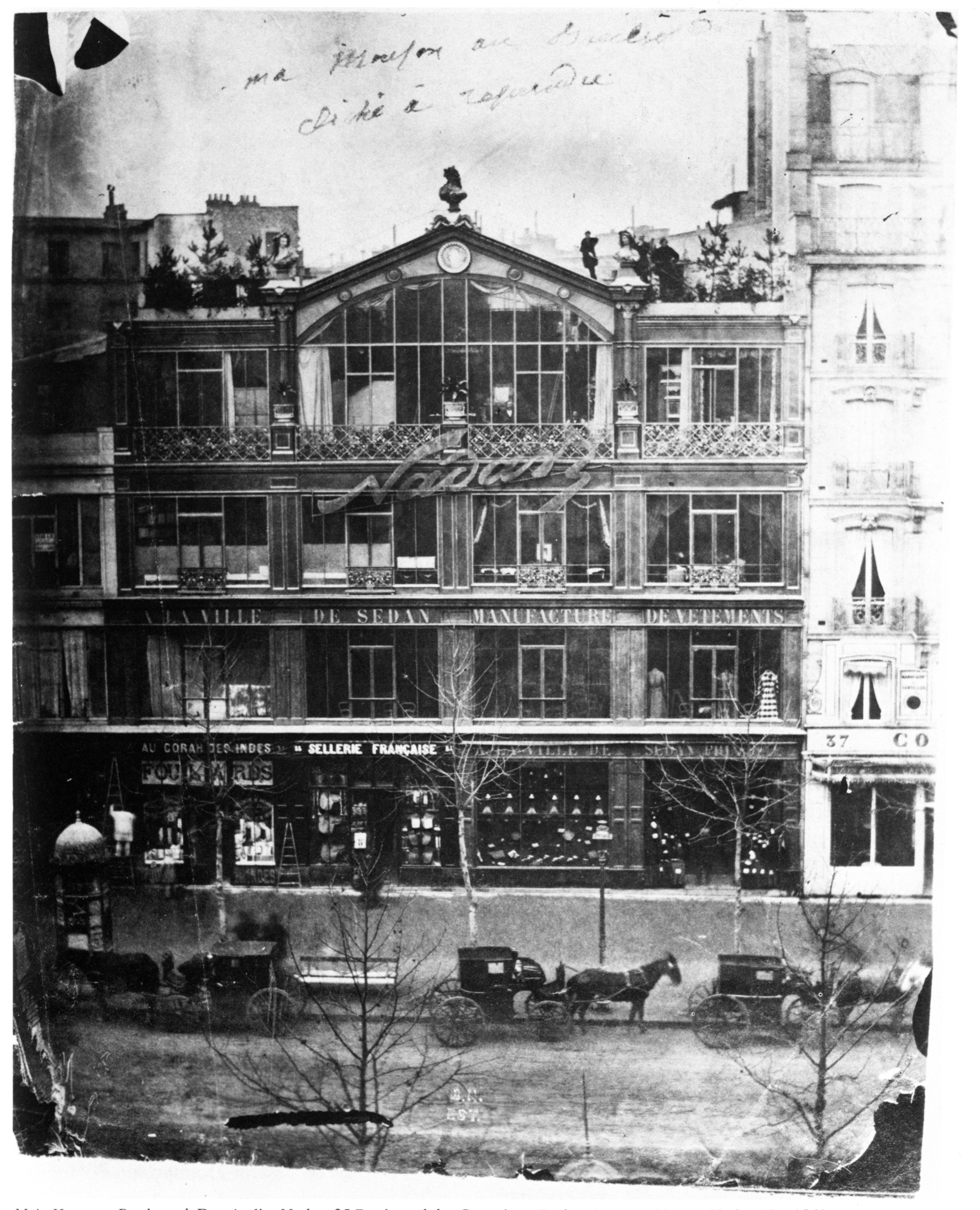
Nadar's studio at 35 Boulevard des Capucines in 1860

In 1854, a friend encouraged Nadar to begin a portrait photography business. Busy with caricature, Nadar yielded operations to his younger brother, Adrien Tournachon, who took over the business completely and soon ran into debt. Nadar, who had started taking portraits at his own photographic studio at 113 rue St. Lazare, helped his brother revitalize the business, but tensions between them created division and led to legal disputes over the right to use the name "Nadar".

In 1860, Nadar moved to 35 Boulevard des Capucines where he photographed a wide range of personalities: politicians (Guizot, Proudhon), stage actors (Sarah Bernhardt, Paulus), writers (Hugo, Baudelaire, Sand, Nerval, Gautier, Dumas), painters (Corot, Delacroix, Millet), and musicians (Liszt, Rossini, Offenbach, Verdi, Berlioz). In the studio, Nadar eschewed traditional sumptuous decors, unnecessary accessories, and preferred natural daylight. In 1886, with his son Paul, he did what may be the first photo-report: an interview with the great scientist Michel Eugène Chevreul, who at the time was 100 years old. It was published in Le Journal Illustré.

Balloon Le Geant flown by Gaspard-Félix Tournachon (Nadar), 1863

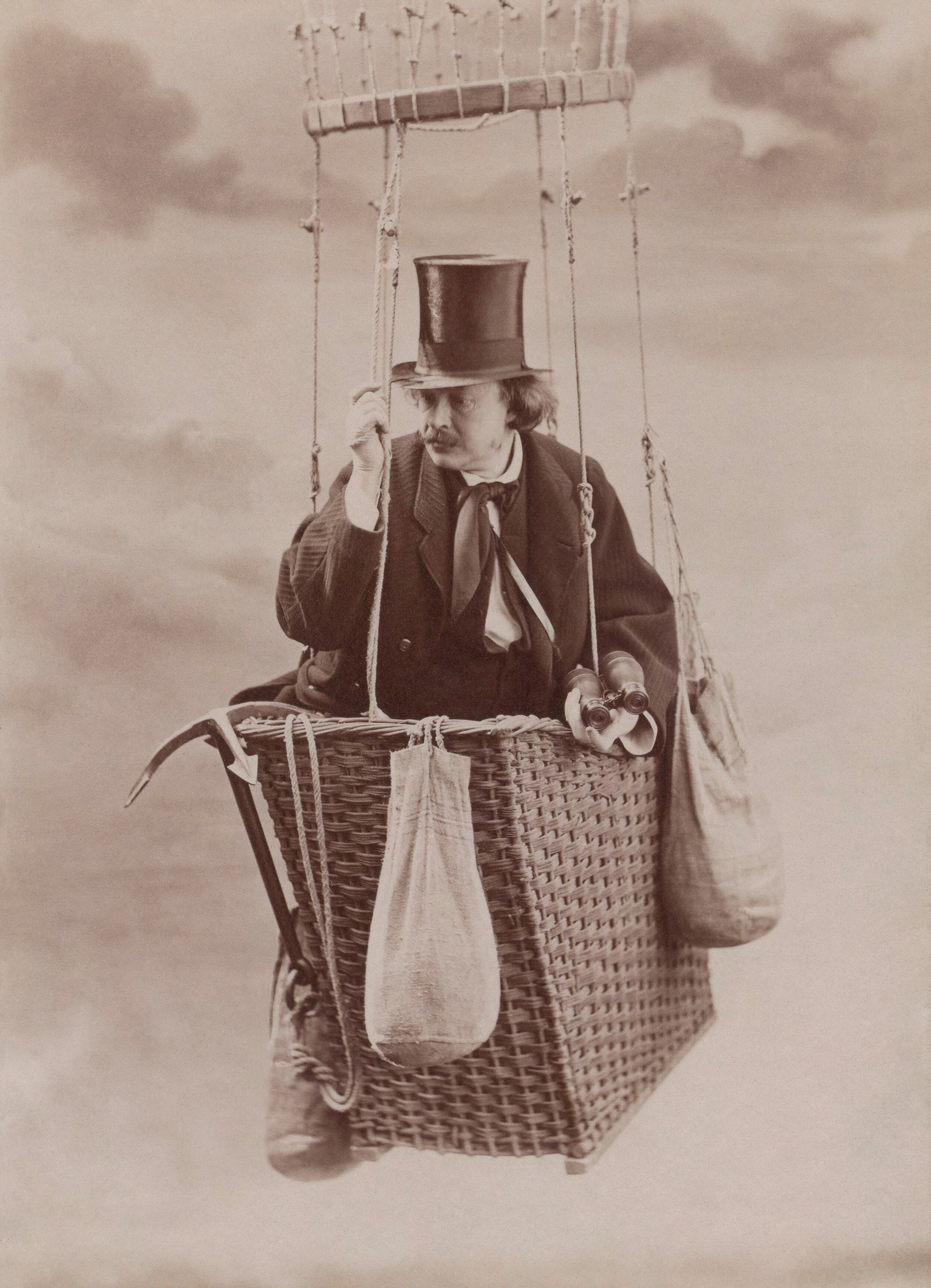
Studio portrait of Nadar in a balloon basket, c. 1863

In 1858, he became the first person to take aerial photographs. This was done using the wet plate collodion process, and since the plates had to be prepared and developed (a process that required a chemically neutral setting) while the basket was aloft, Nadar experienced imaging problems as gas escaped from his balloons. After Nadar invented a gas-proof cotton cover and draped it over his balloon baskets, he was able to capture stable images. He also pioneered the use of artificial lighting in photography, working in the catacombs of Paris. He was thus the first person to photograph from the air with his balloons, as well as the first to photograph underground, in the Catacombs of Paris. In 1867, he published the first magazine to focus on air travel: L'Aéronaute.

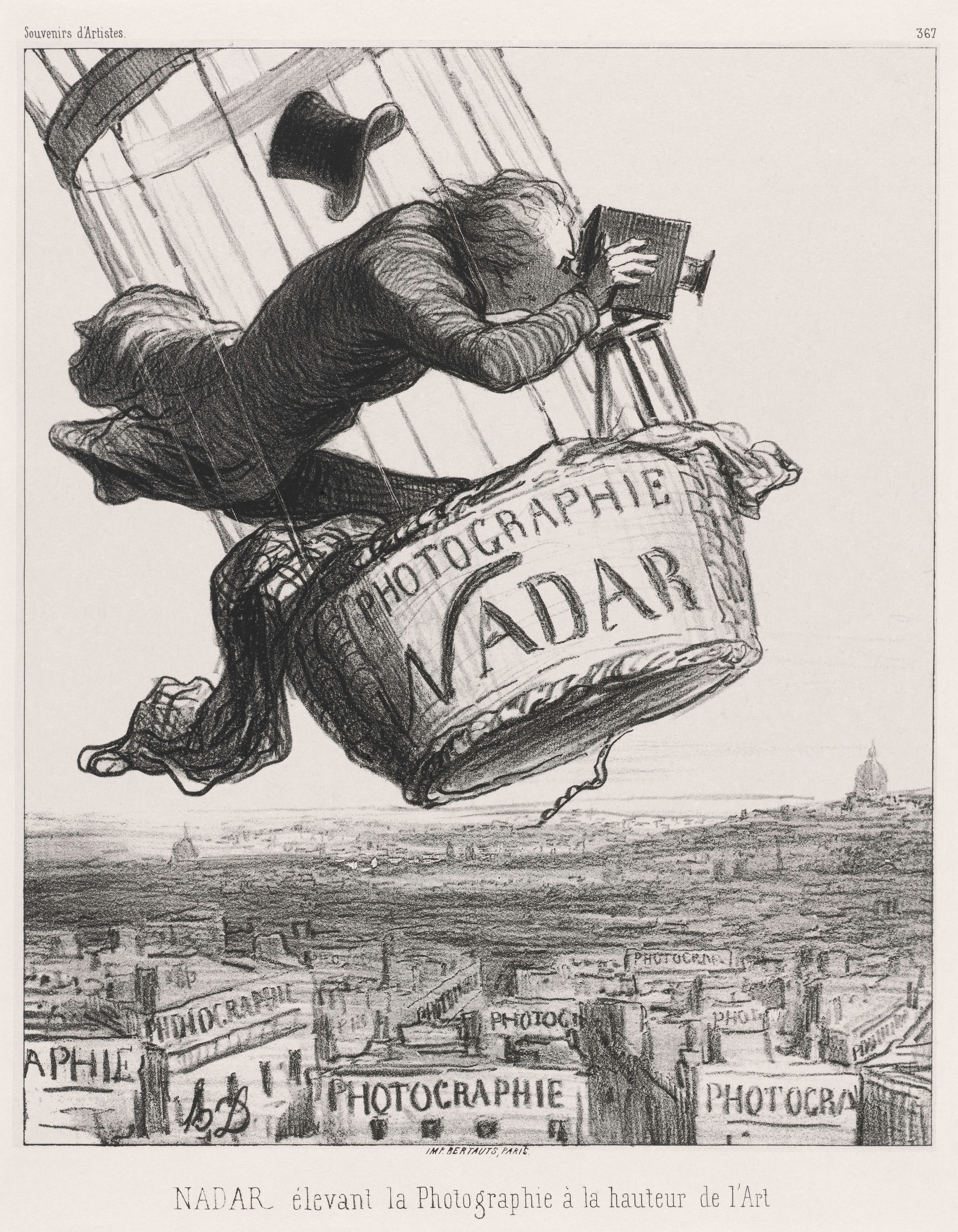
Nadar élevant la Photographie à la hauteur de l'Art ("Nadar elevating Photography to Art"). Lithograph by Honoré Daumier.

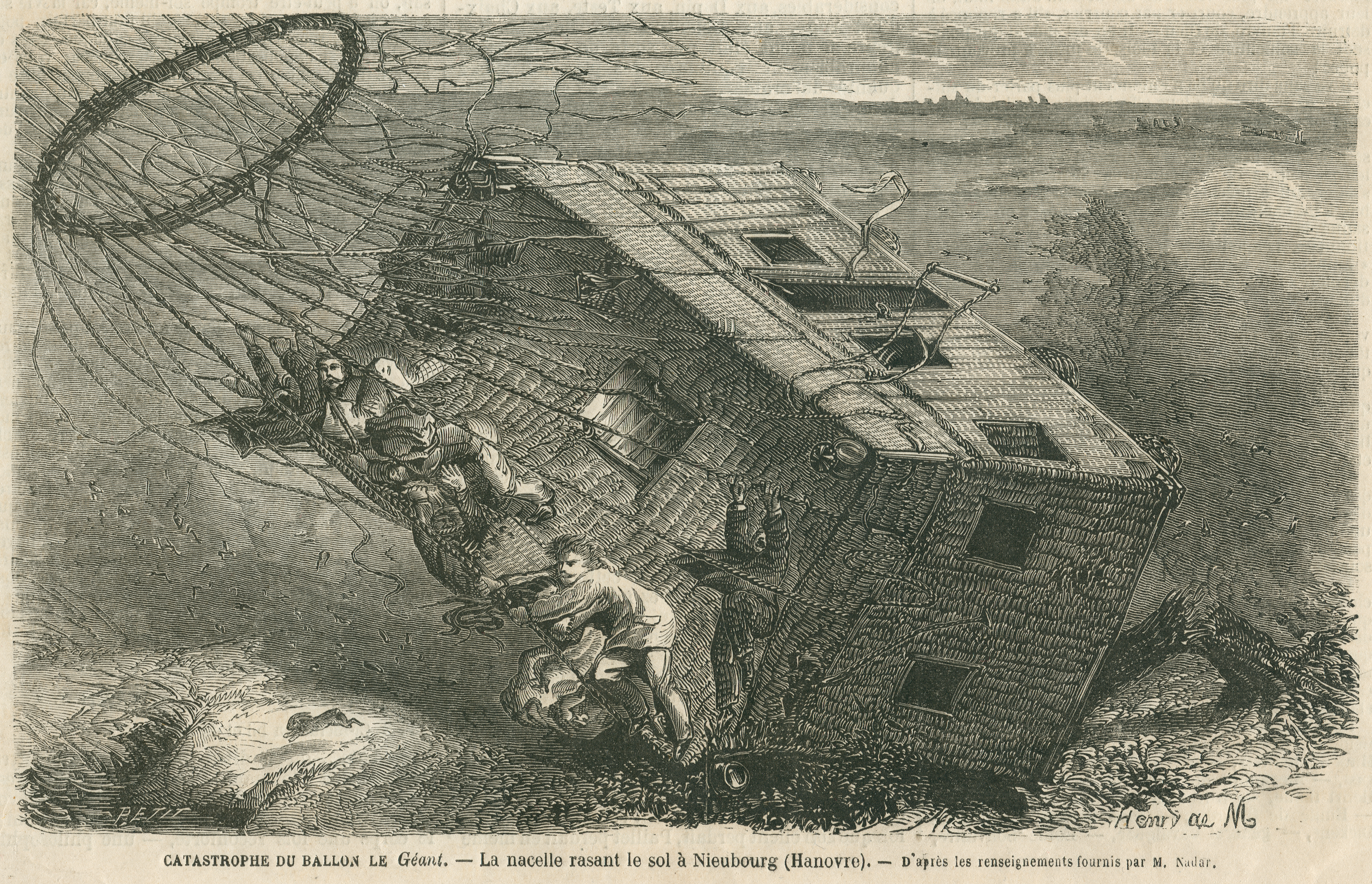
1863: Disaster with Le Géant at Neustadt am Rübenberge at Hanover. Illustration in a newspaper

In 1863, Nadar commissioned the prominent balloonist Eugène Godard to construct an enormous balloon, 60 metres (196 ft) high and with a capacity of 6,000 m^{3} (210,000 ft^{3}), and named Le Géant (The Giant). On his visit to Brussels with Le Géant, on 26 September 1864, Nadar erected mobile barriers to keep the crowd at a safe distance. Crowd control barriers are still known in Belgium as Nadar barriers. Le Géant was badly damaged at the end of its second flight, but Nadar rebuilt the gondola and the envelope, and continued his flights. In 1867, he was able to take as many as a dozen passengers aloft at once, serving cold chicken and wine.

For publicity, he recreated balloon flights in his studio with his wife, Ernestine, using a rigged-up balloon gondola. He stayed a passionate aeronaut until he and Ernestine were injured in an accident in Le Géant.

c. 1865: "Revolving" self-portrait by Nadar

Le Géant (The Giant) inspired Jules Verne's Five Weeks in a Balloon. Nadar was the inspiration for the character of Michael Ardan in Verne's From the Earth to the Moon. In 1862, Verne and Nadar established a Société pour la recherche de la navigation aérienne, which later became La Société d'encouragement de la locomotion aérienne au moyen du plus lourd que l'air (The Society for the Encouragement of Aerial Locomotion by Means of Heavier than Air Machines). Nadar served as president and Verne as secretary.

During the Siege of Paris in 1870–71, Nadar was instrumental in organising balloon flights carrying mail to reconnect the besieged Parisians with the rest of the world, thus establishing the world's first airmail service.

In April 1874, he lent his photo studio to a group of painters to present the first exhibition of the Impressionists. He photographed Victor Hugo on his death-bed in 1885. He is credited with having published (in 1886) the first photo-interview (of famous chemist Michel Eugène Chevreul, then a centenarian). His photographs of women are notable for their natural poses and individual character. Nadar was recognized for breaking the conventions of photographic portrait, choosing to capture the subjects as active participants.

As of 1 April 1895, Nadar turned over the Paris Nadar Studio to his son Paul. He moved to Marseille, where he established another photography studio in 1897. On 3 January 1909 he returned to Paris.

Nadar died on 20 March 1910, aged 89. He was buried in Père Lachaise Cemetery in Paris. The studio continued under the direction of his son and long-term collaborator, Paul Nadar (1856–1939).

== Works ==
Towards the end of his life, Nadar published Quand j'étais photographe, which was translated into English and published by MIT Press in 2015. The book is full of both anecdotes and samples of his photography, including many portraits of recognizable names.

The painter Jean-Auguste-Dominique Ingres sent some of his clients to Nadar to have their photographs taken as studies for his paintings.

=== Gallery ===
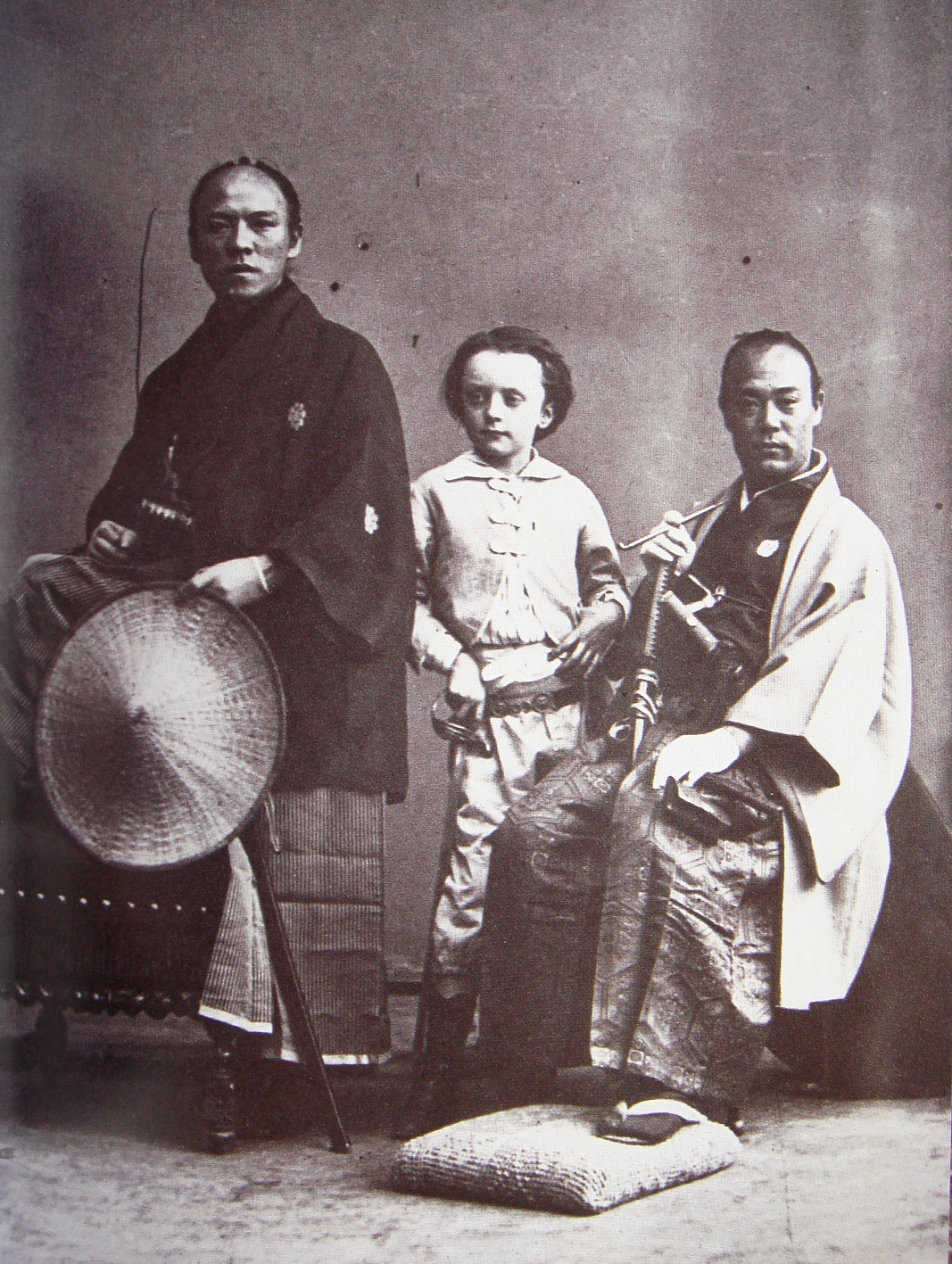
Nadar's son (center) with Yatsu Kanshiro (left) and an unnamed samurai (right), photographed by Nadar. They were members of the Second Japanese Embassy to Europe in 1863.

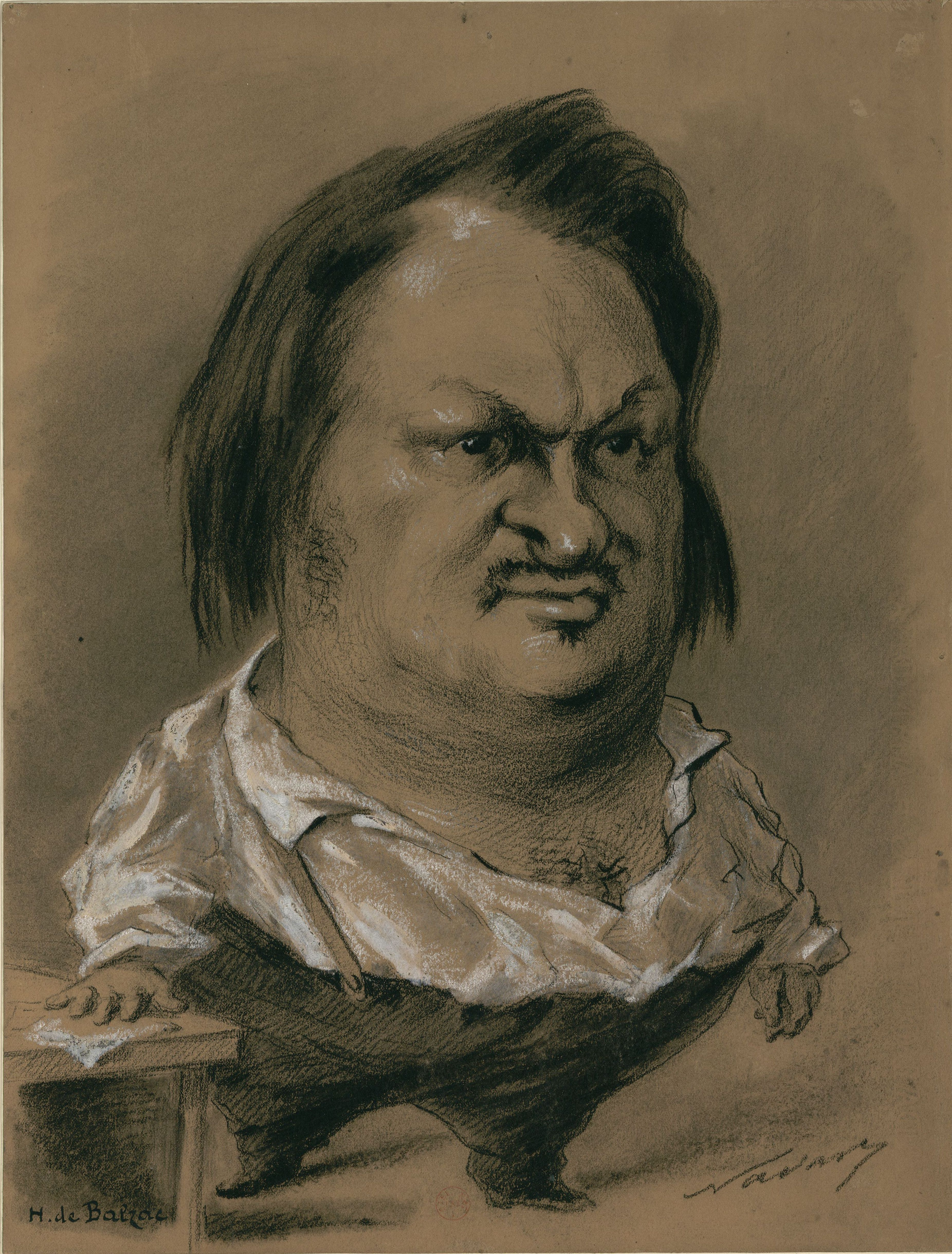
Caricature of Balzac, 1850

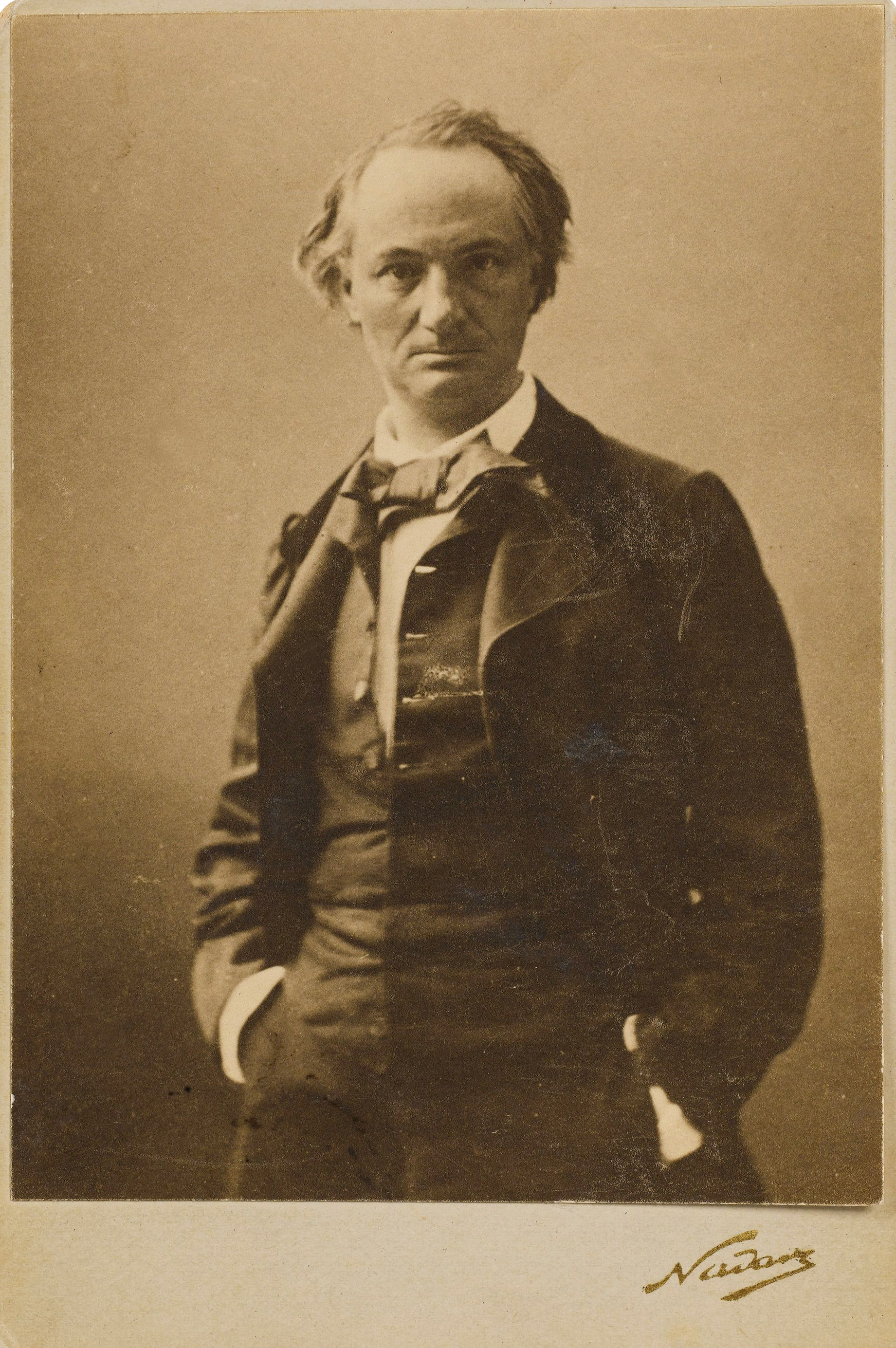
Charles Baudelaire, 1855

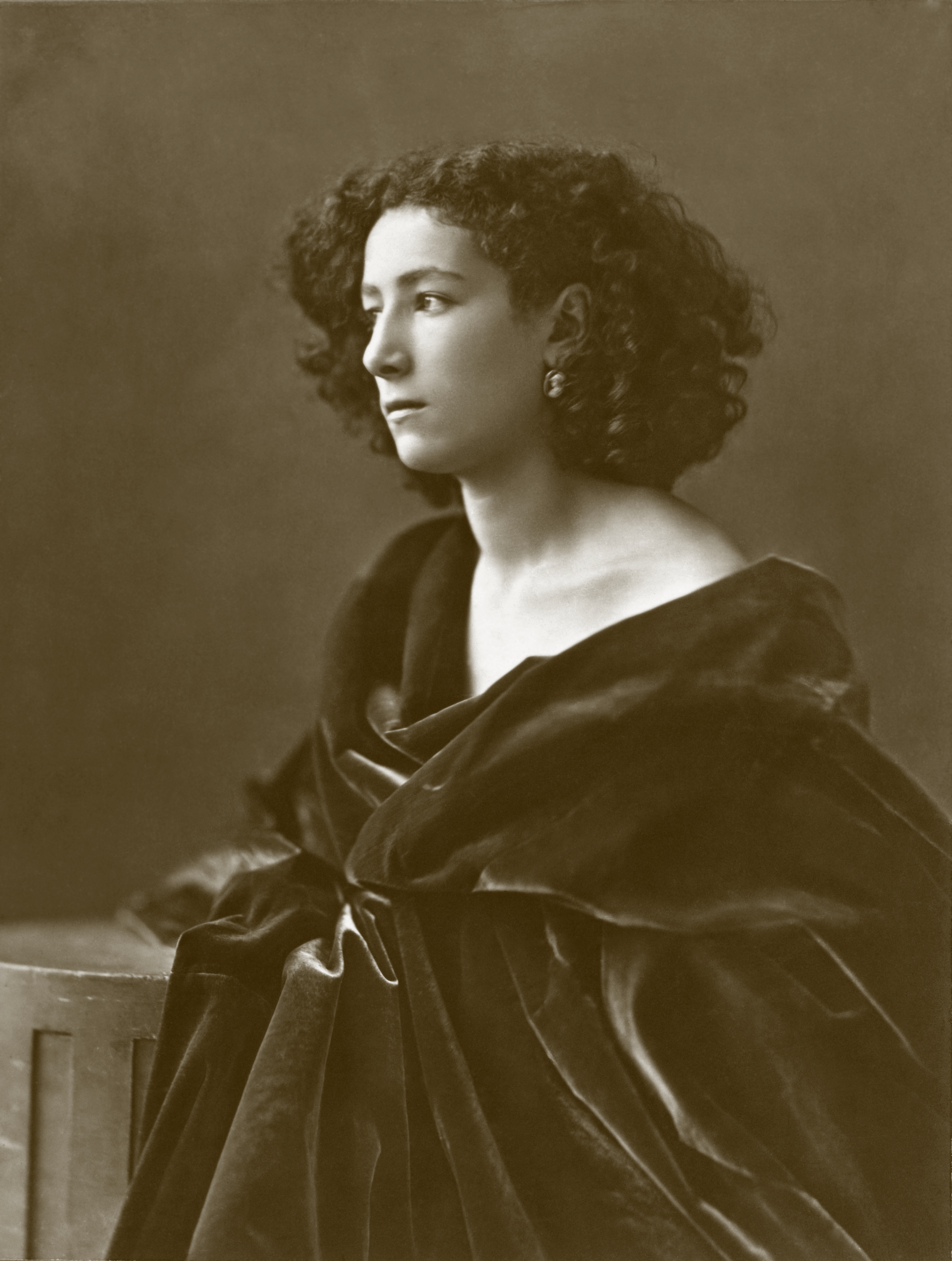
Sarah Bernhardt, c. 1864

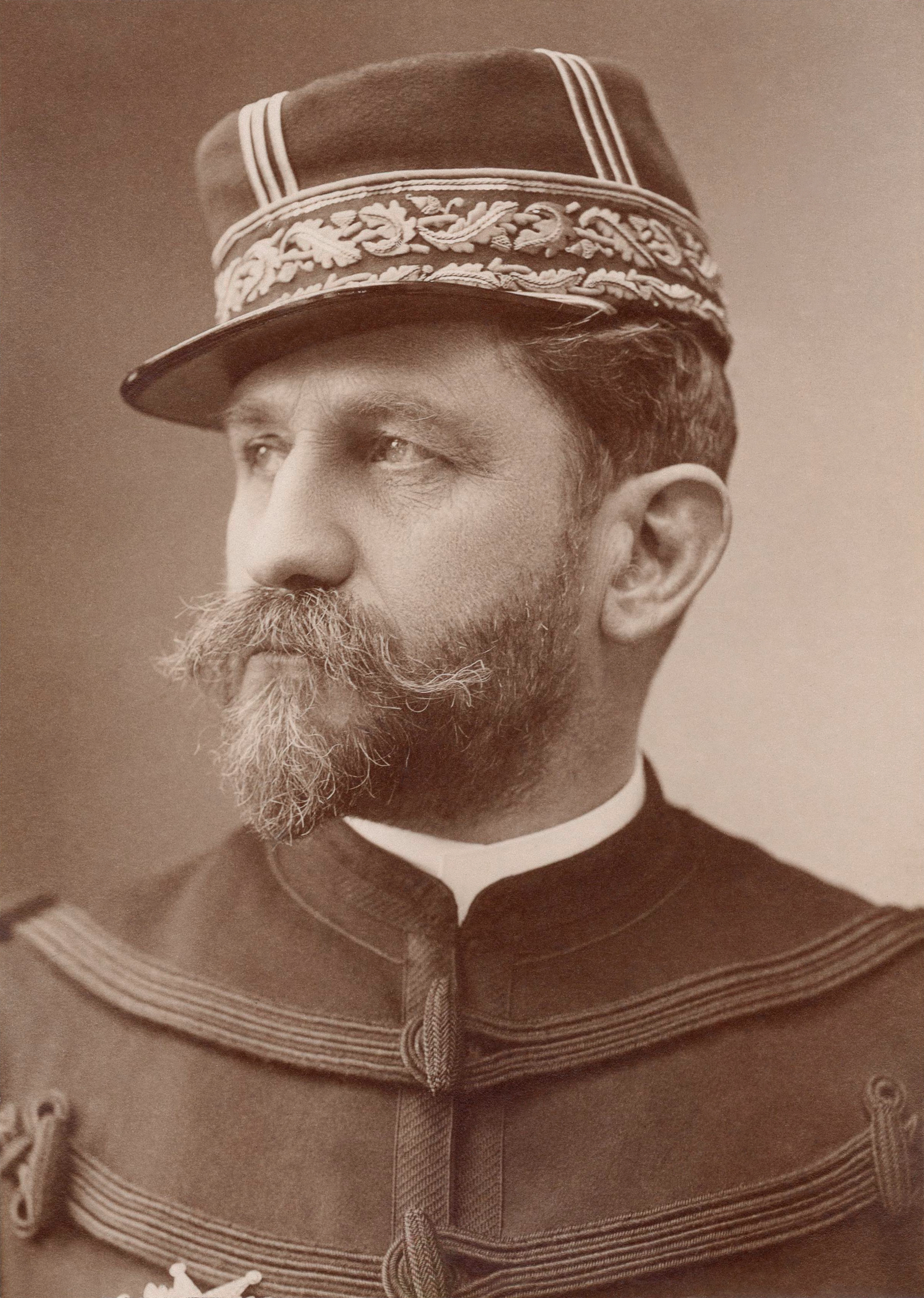
Georges Ernest Boulanger

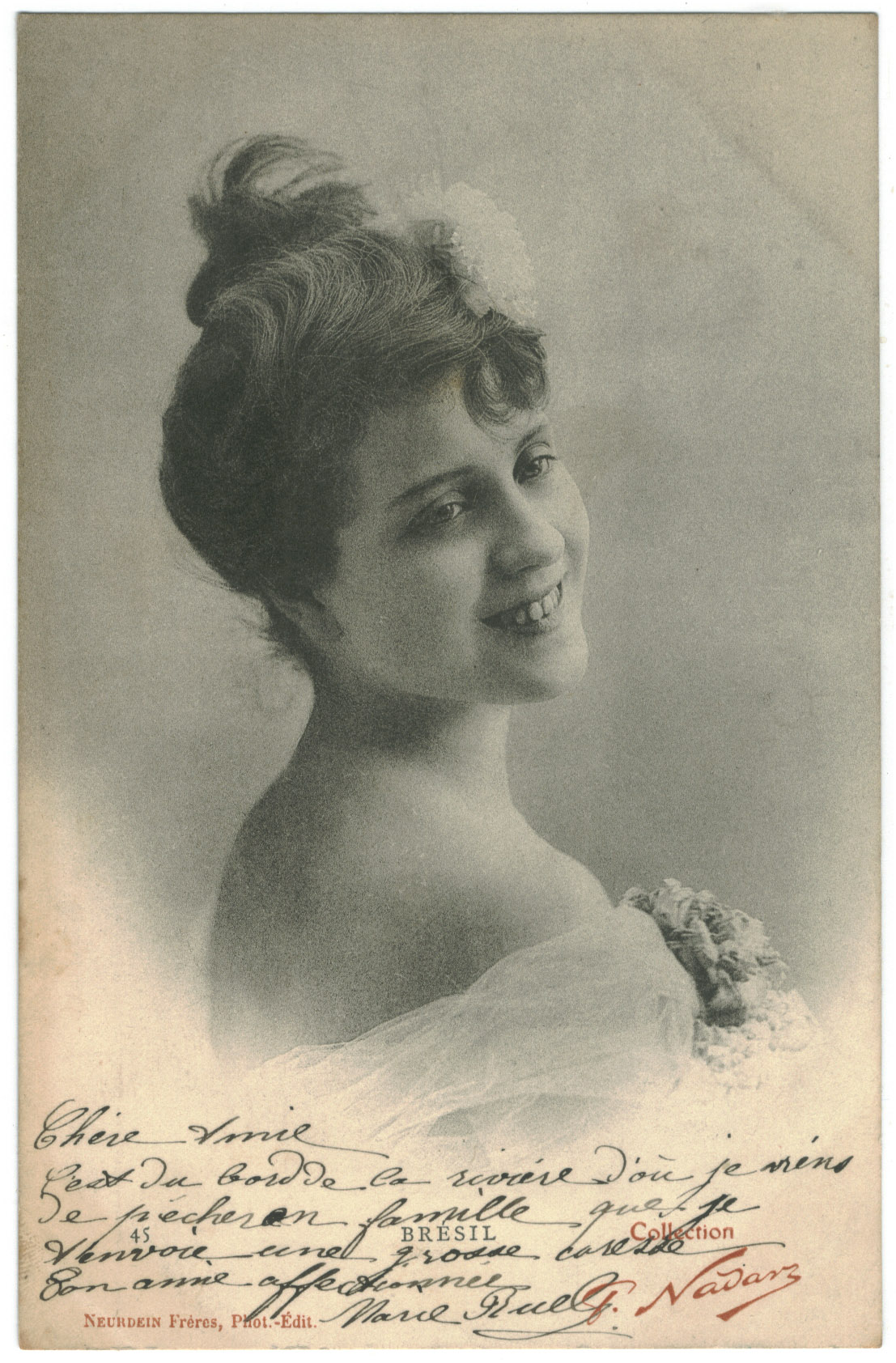
Marguerite Brésil

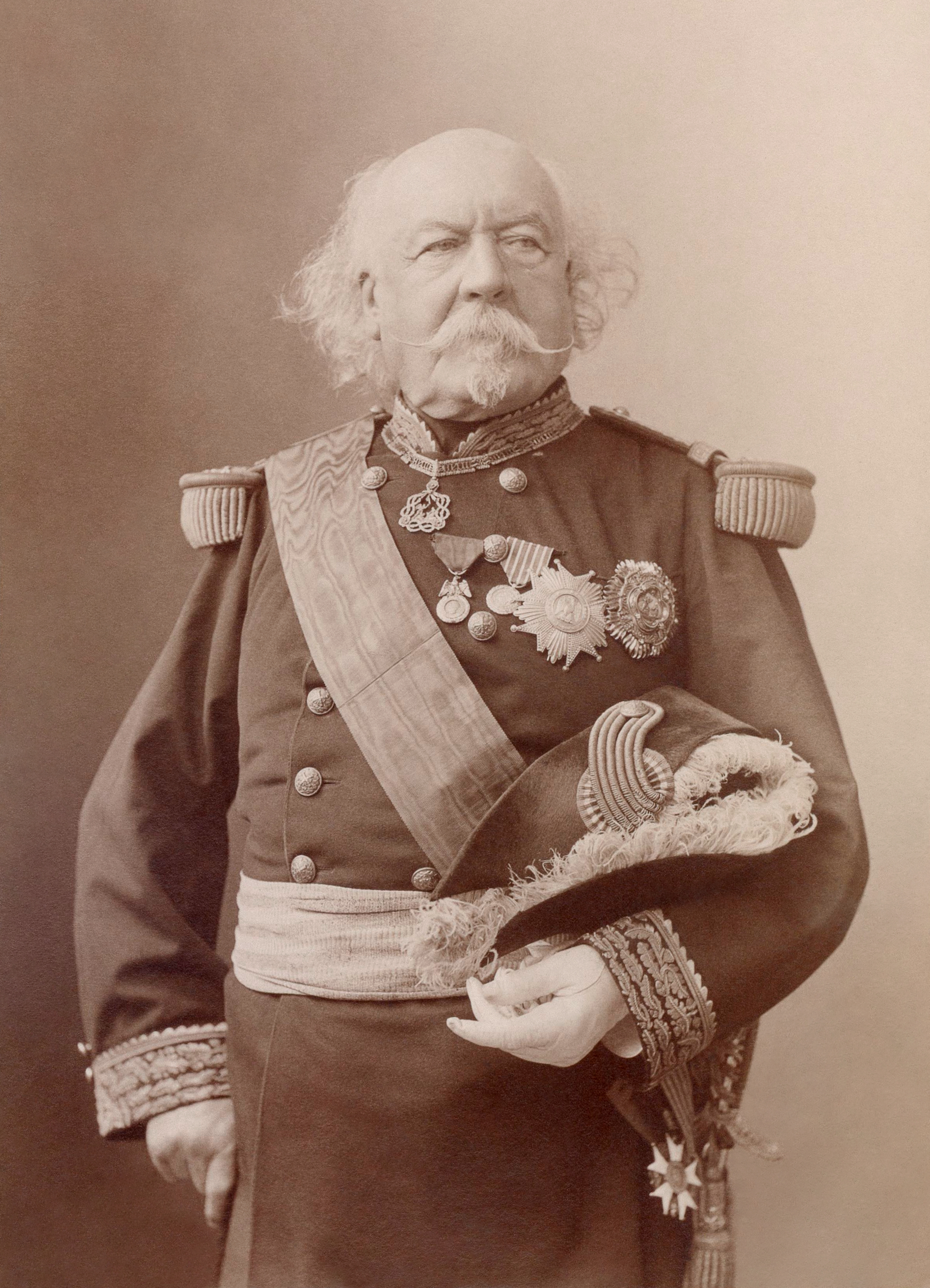
François Certain de Canrobert

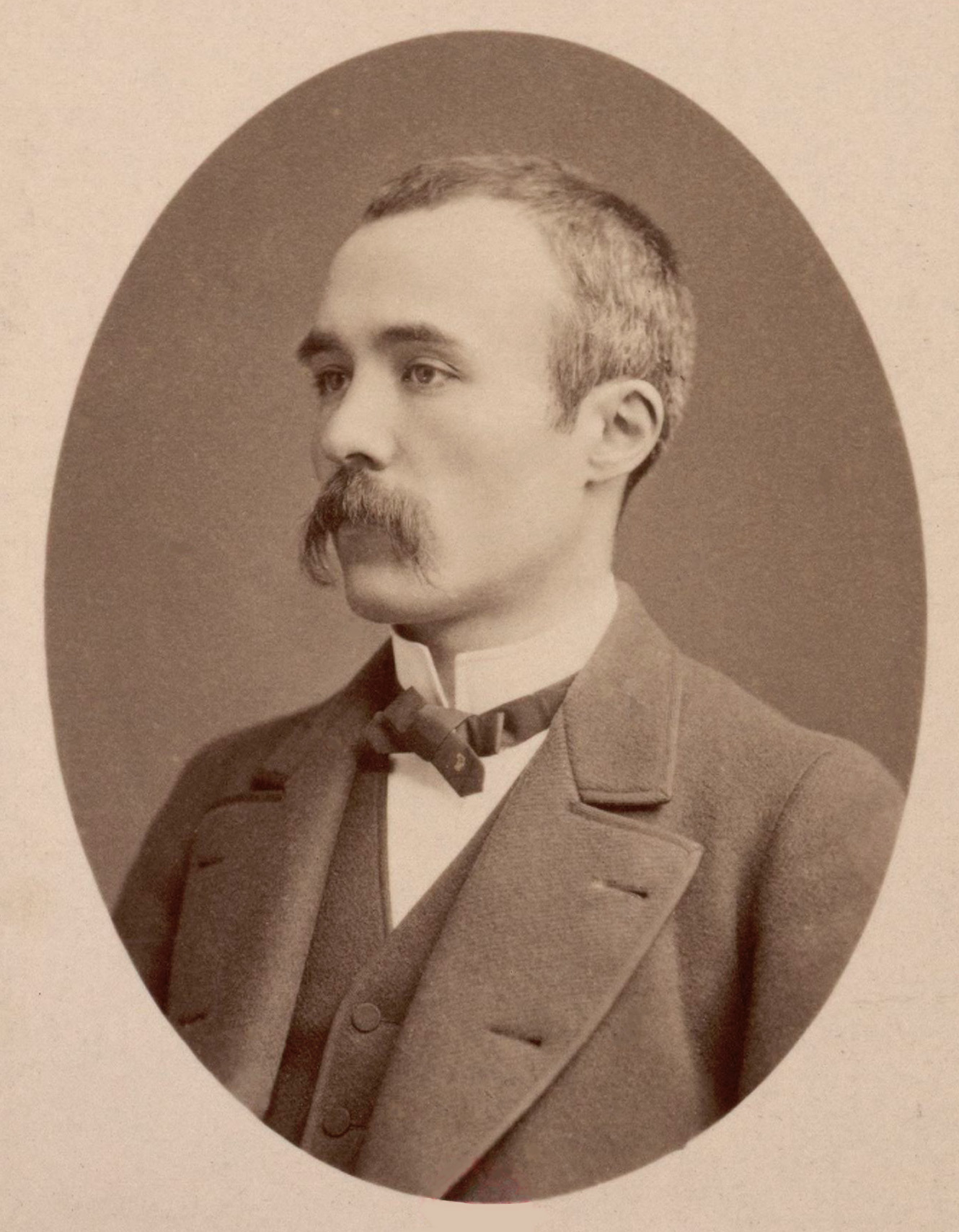
Georges Clemenceau

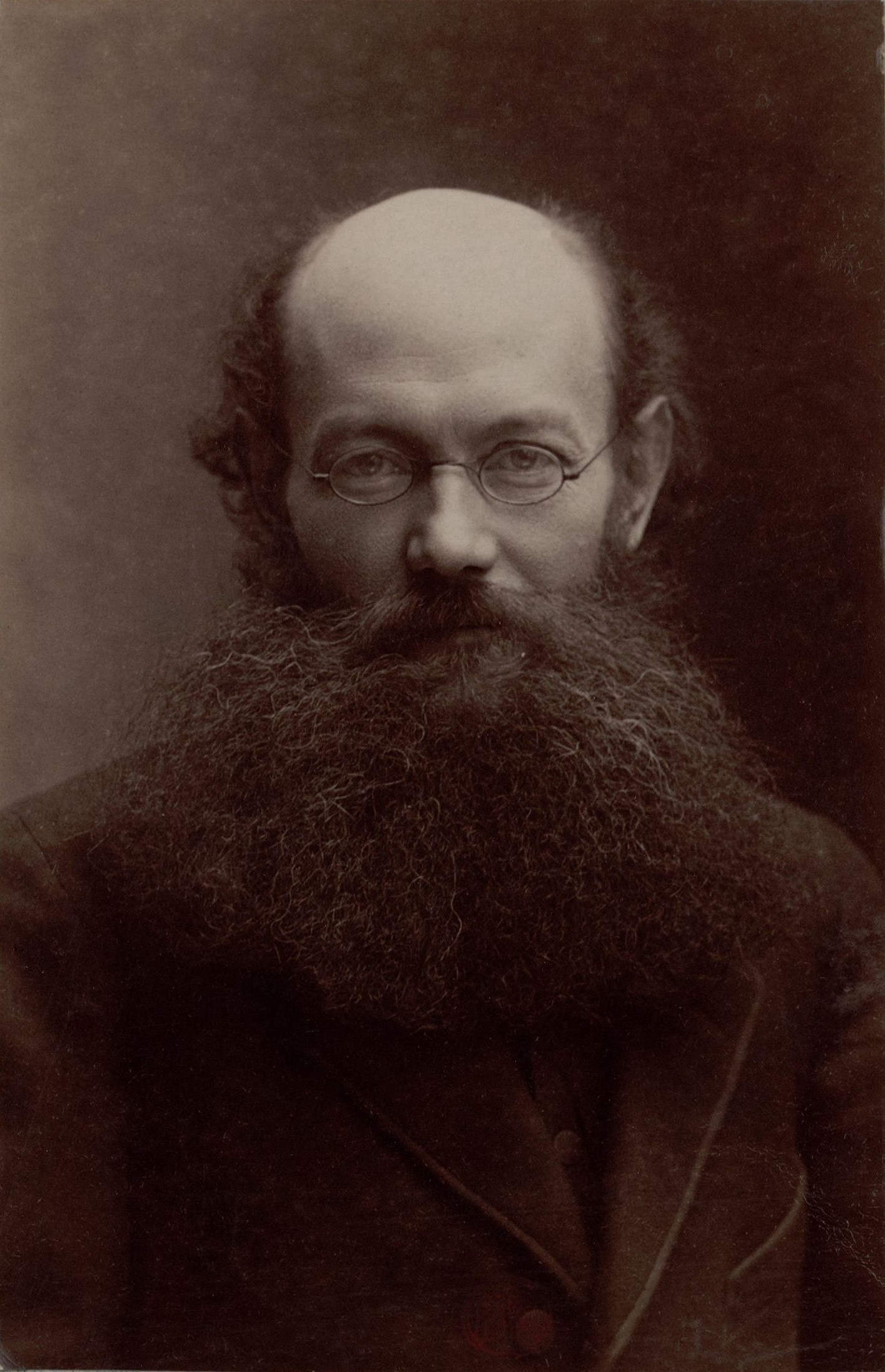
Peter Kropotkin

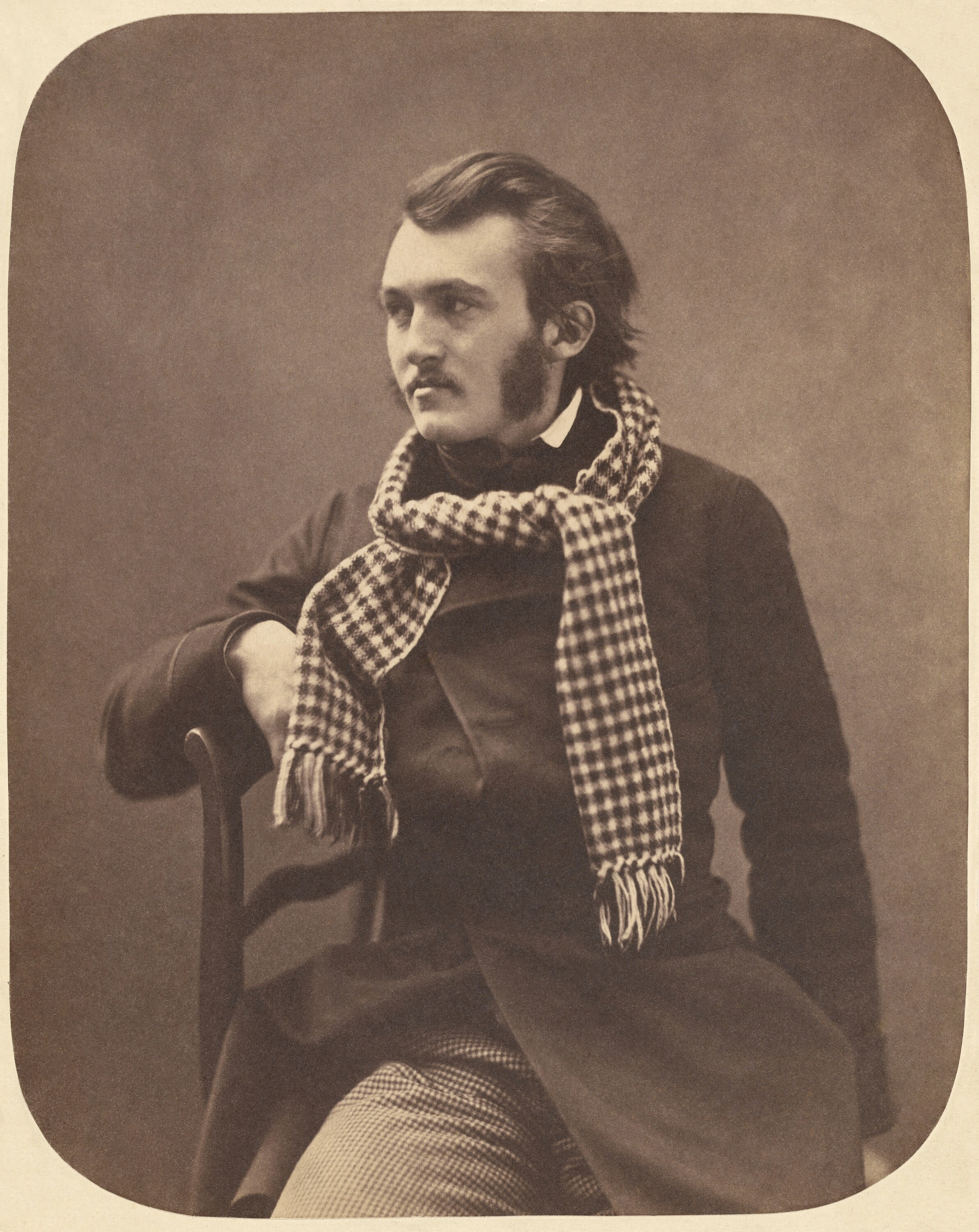
Gustave Doré, between 1856 and 1858

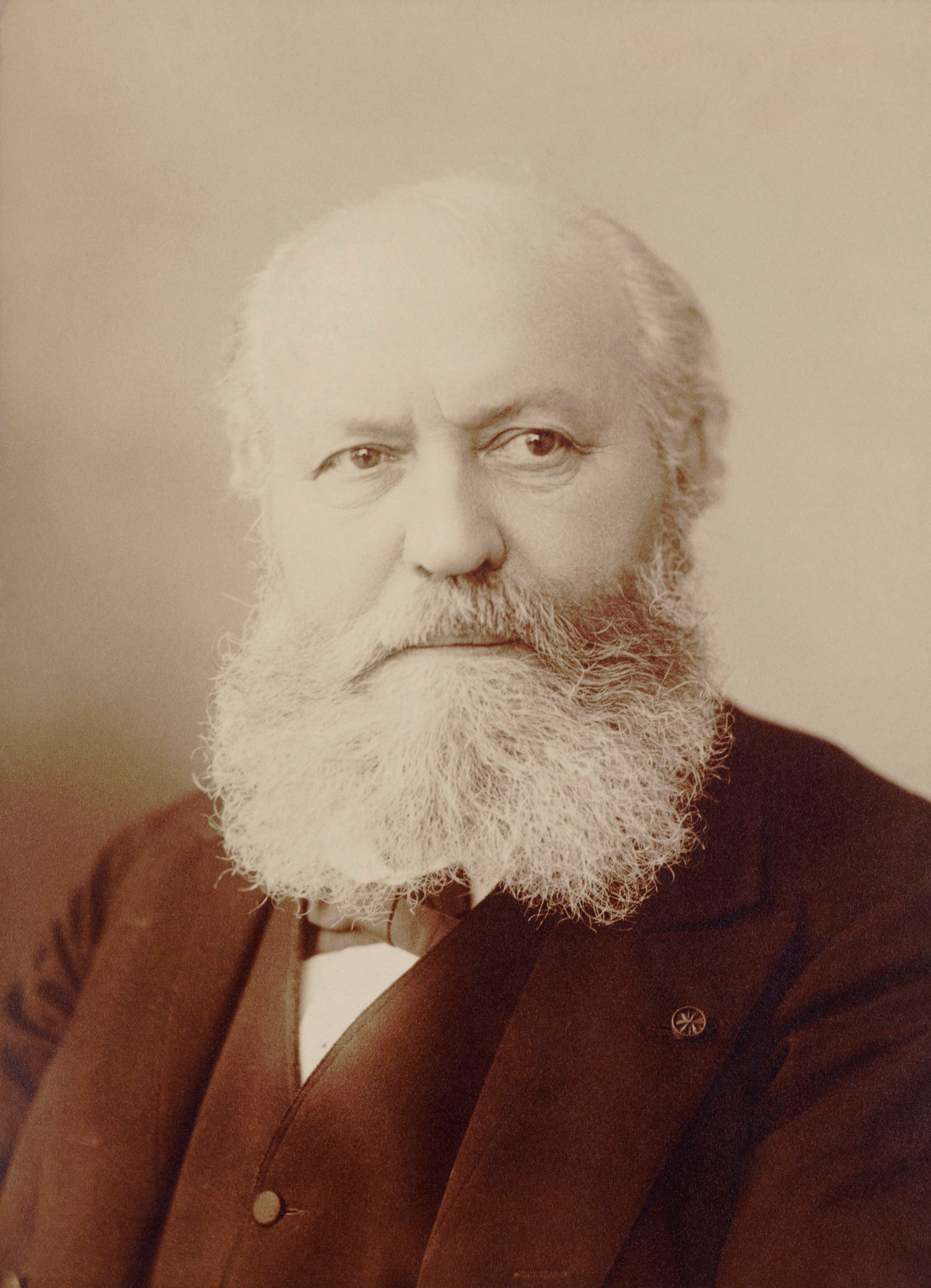
Charles Gounod in 1890

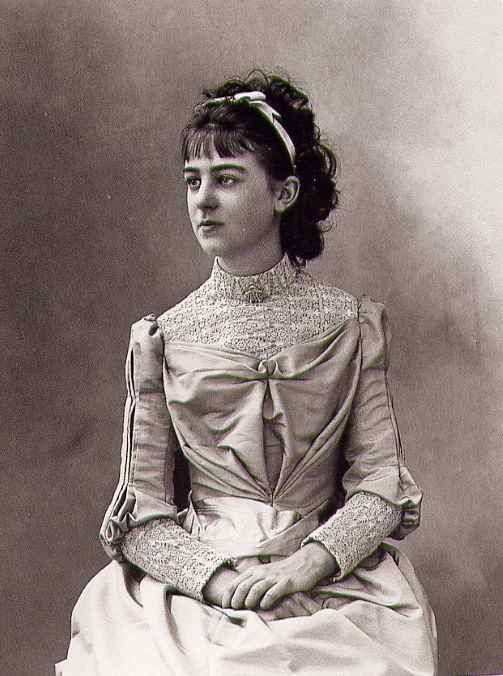
Élisabeth de Gramont, 1889

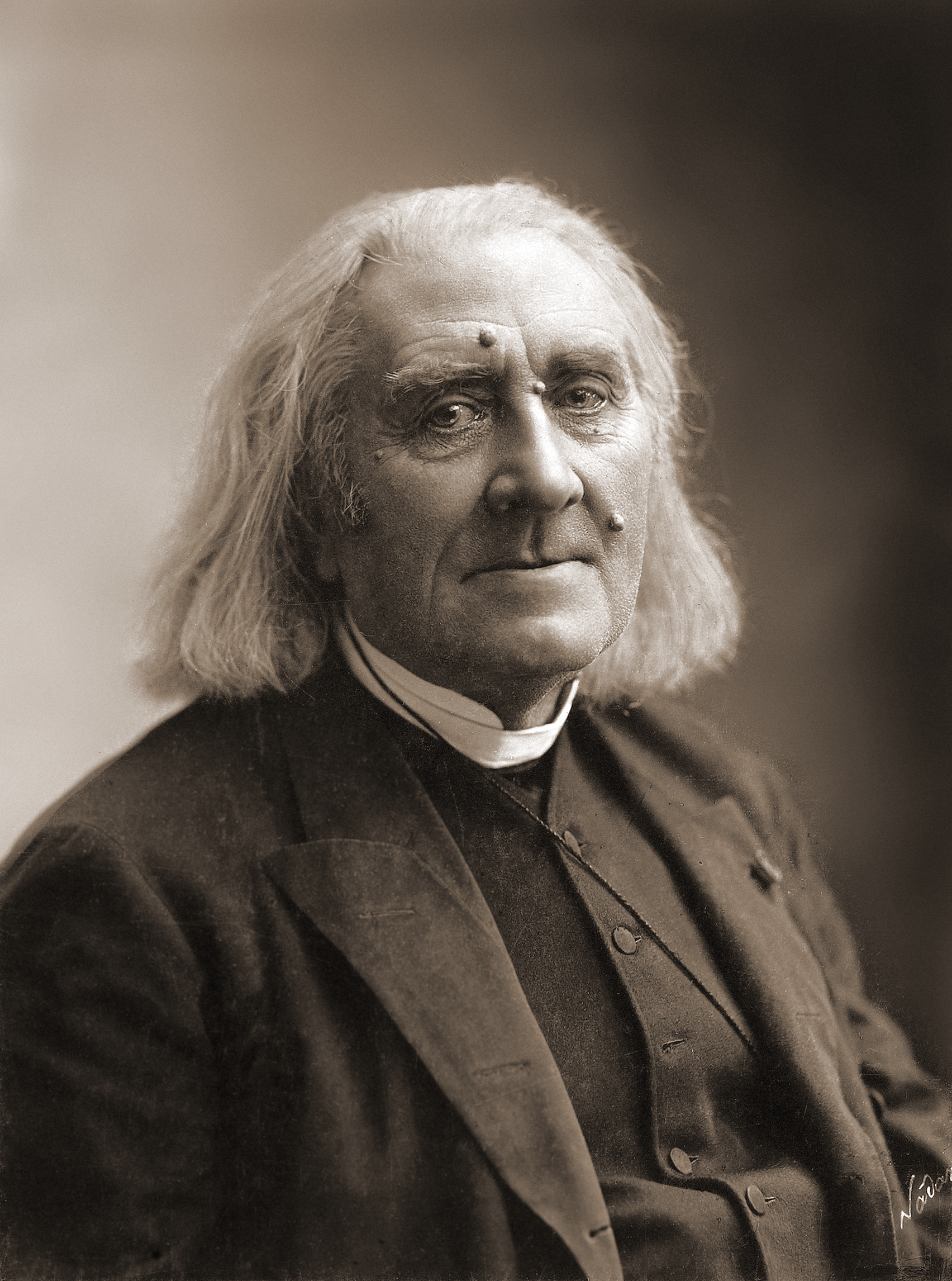
Franz Liszt

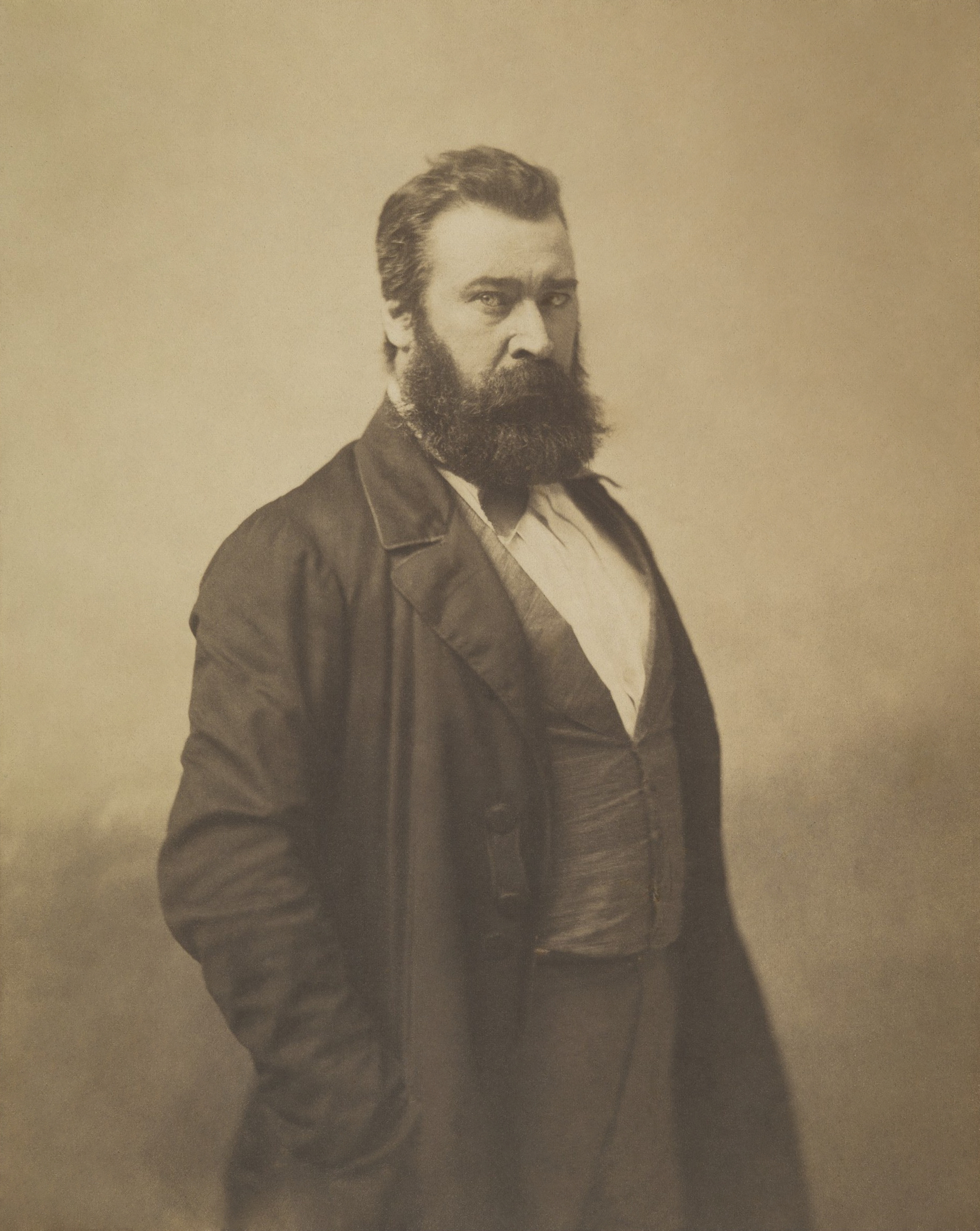
Jean-François Millet

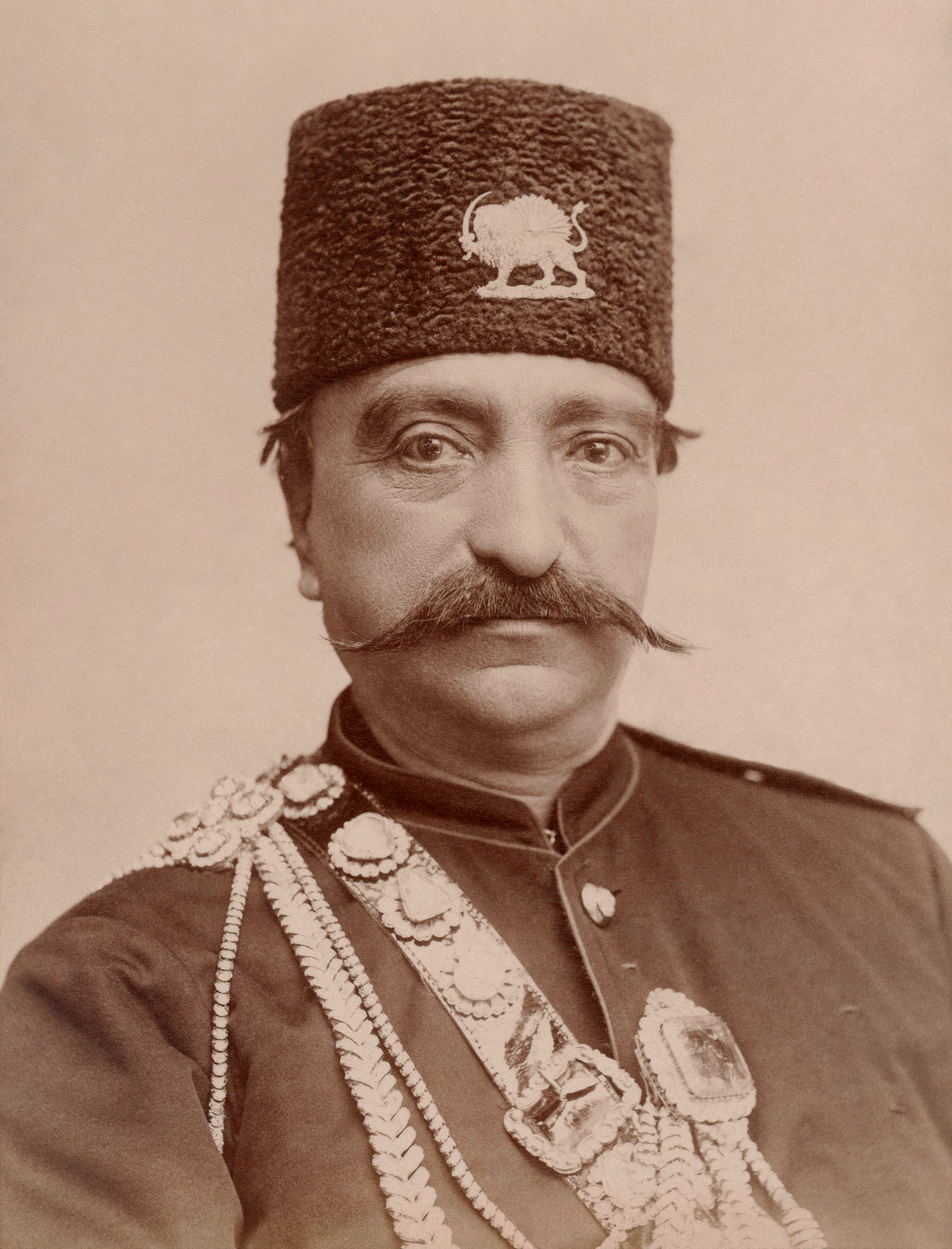
Nasser al-Din Shah Qajar, king of Persia 1848–1896

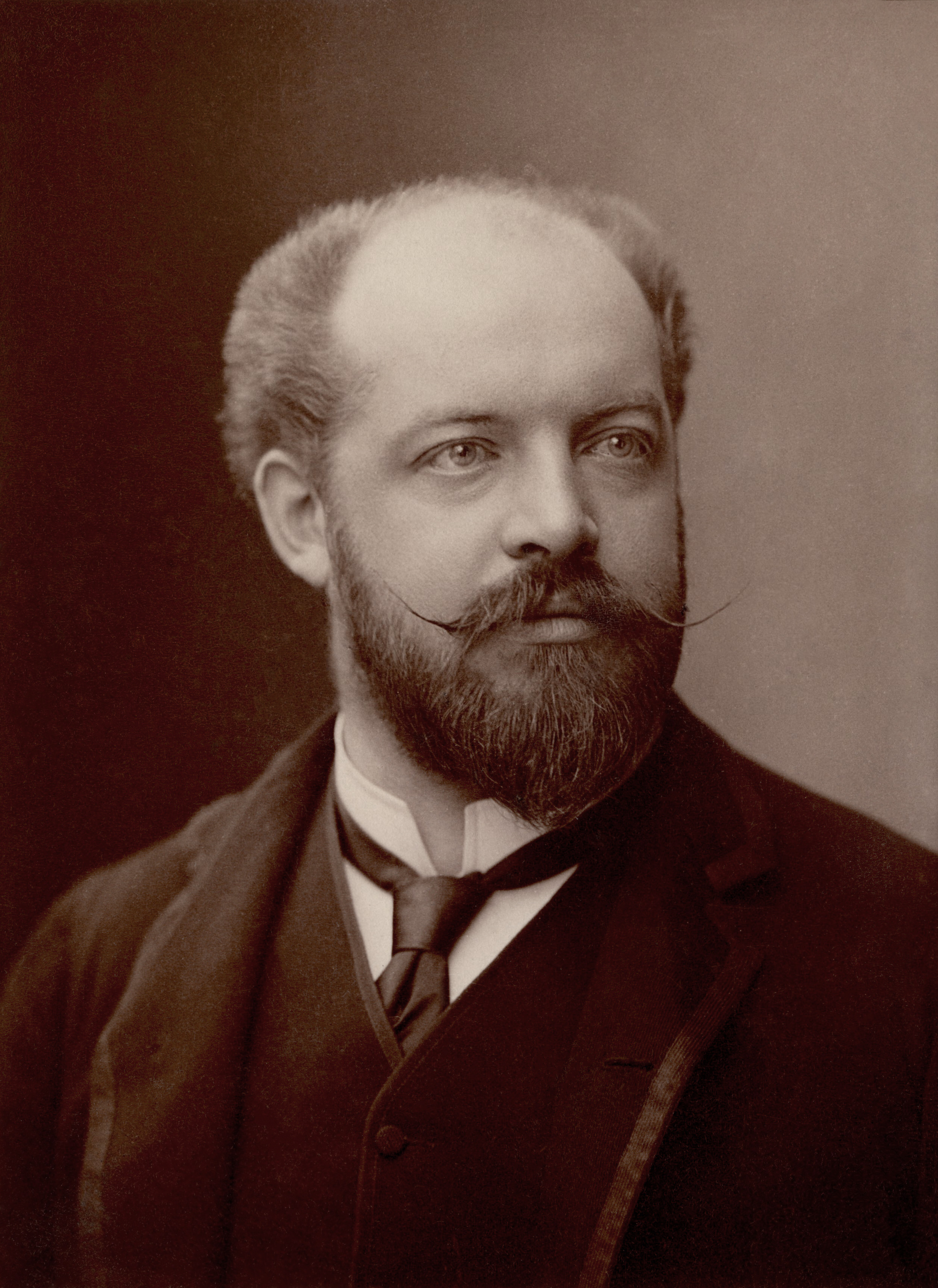
Édouard de Reszke

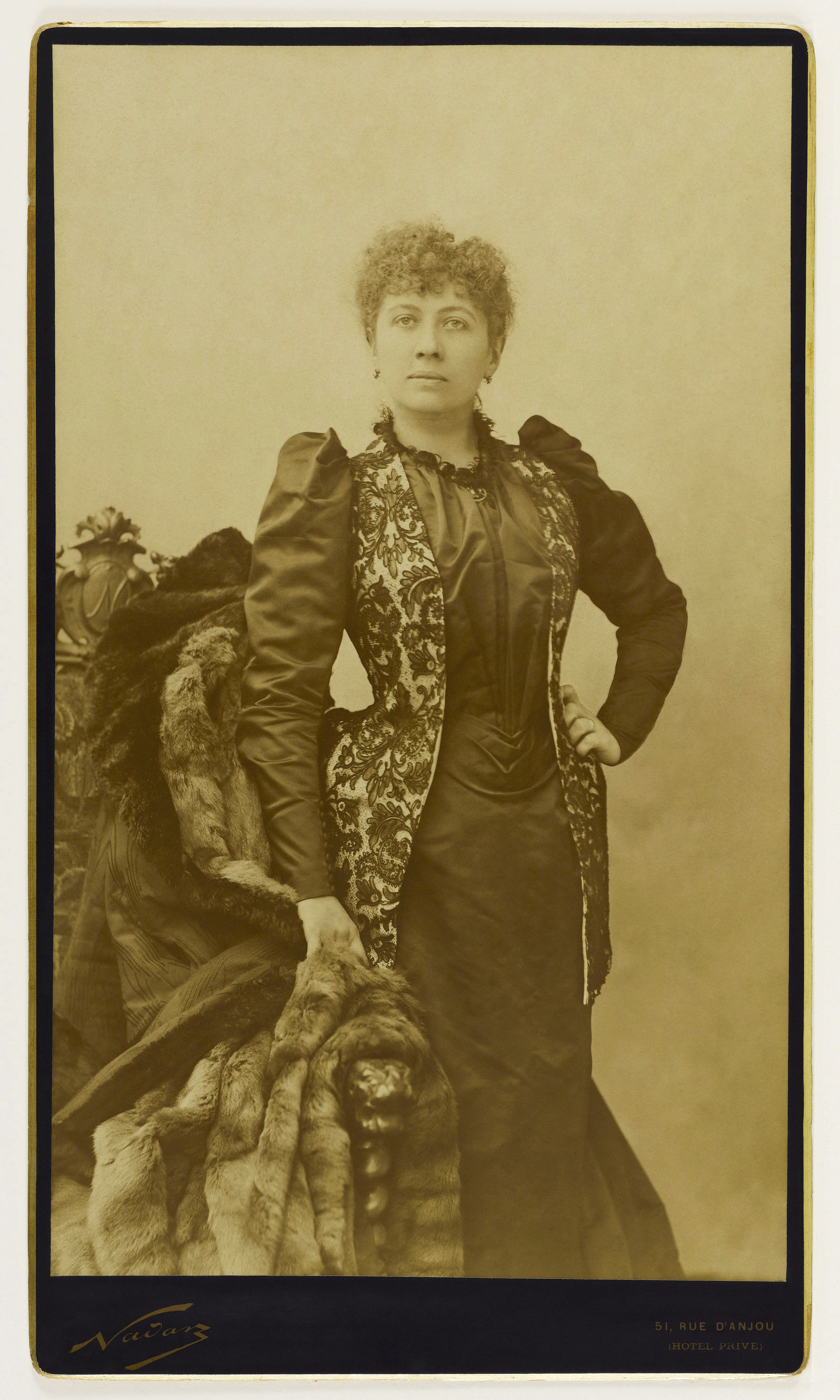
Séverine, c. 1895

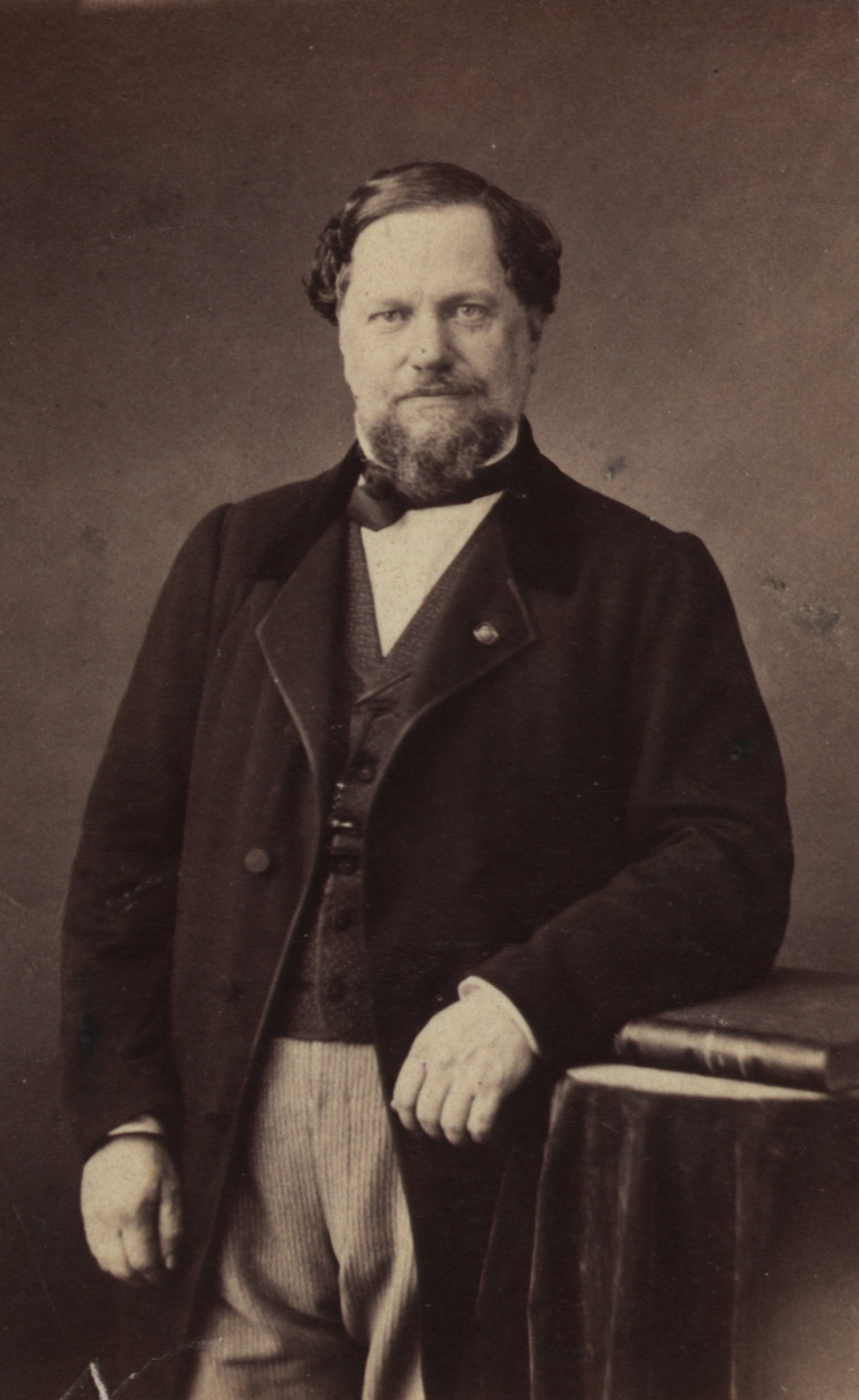
Simon Sinas

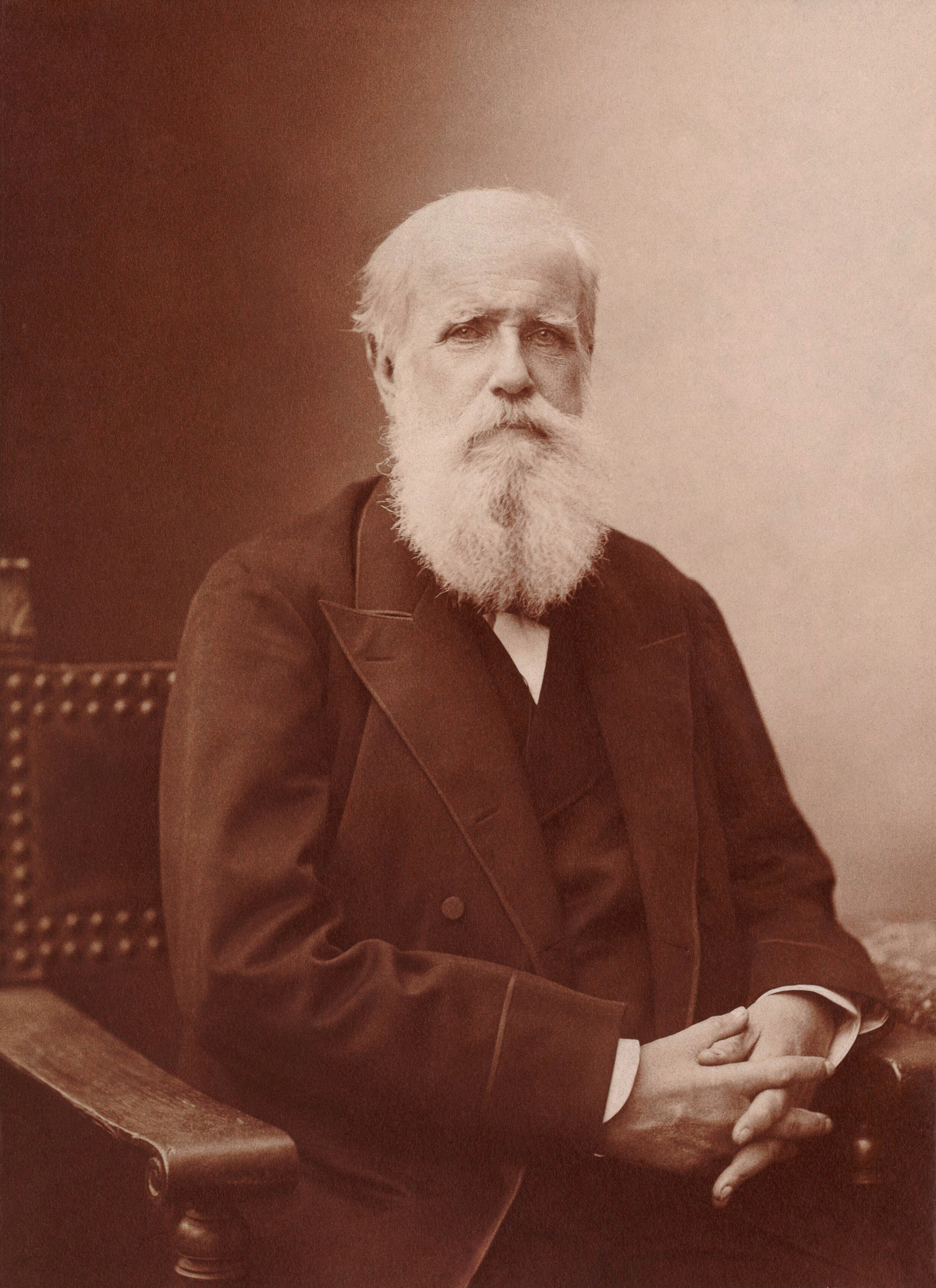
Pedro II of Brazil

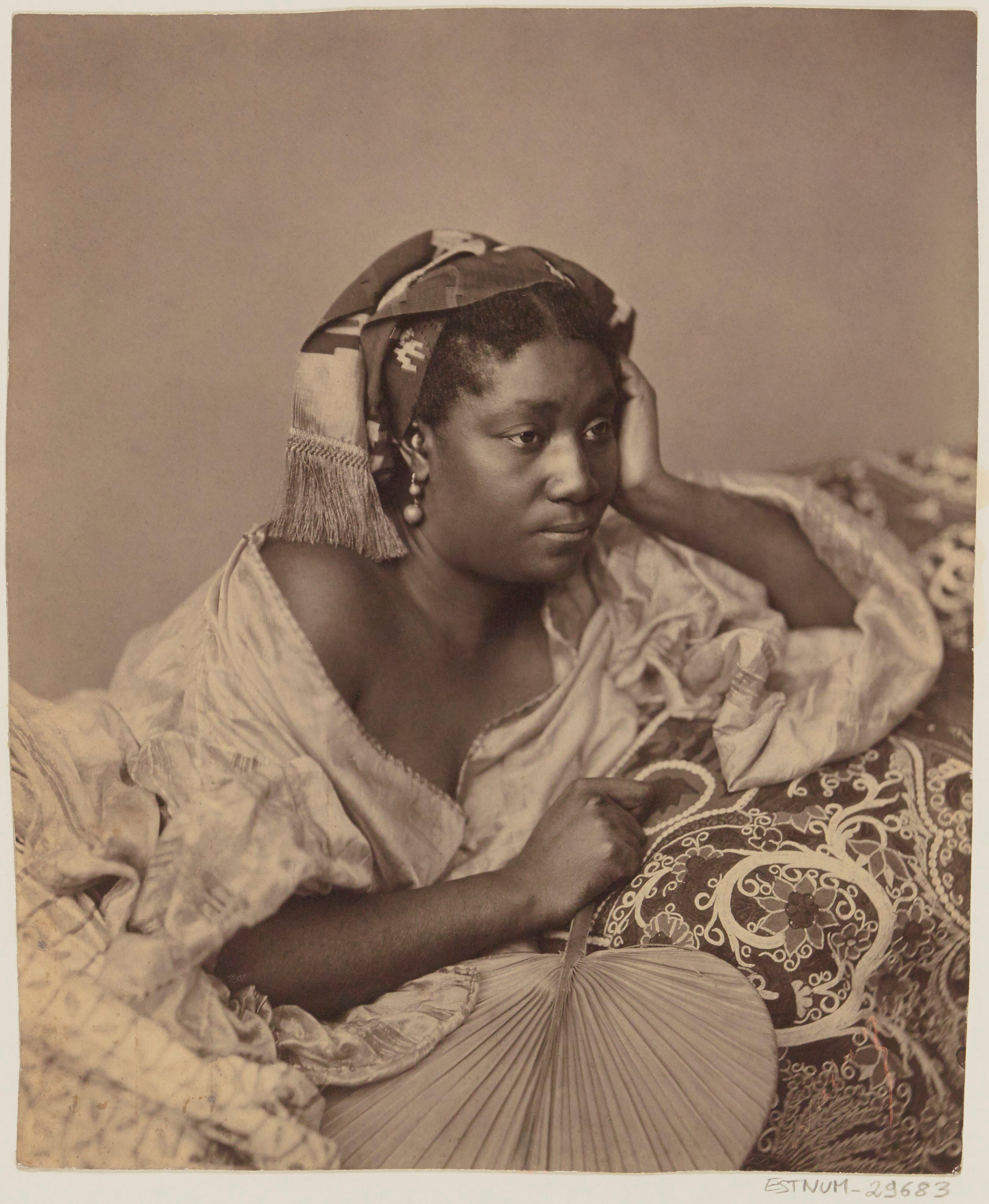
Maria l'Antillaise (1860s), tentatively identified as Maria Martínez

== See also ==
- Prix Nadar, French photojournalism prize given in Nadar's name
- Mononymous person, a person known with only one word
- Michel Ardan, a character from the 1865 novel From the Earth to the Moon who was inspired by Nadar
