= Histoire de ma vie =

Autobiography of Giacomo Casanova

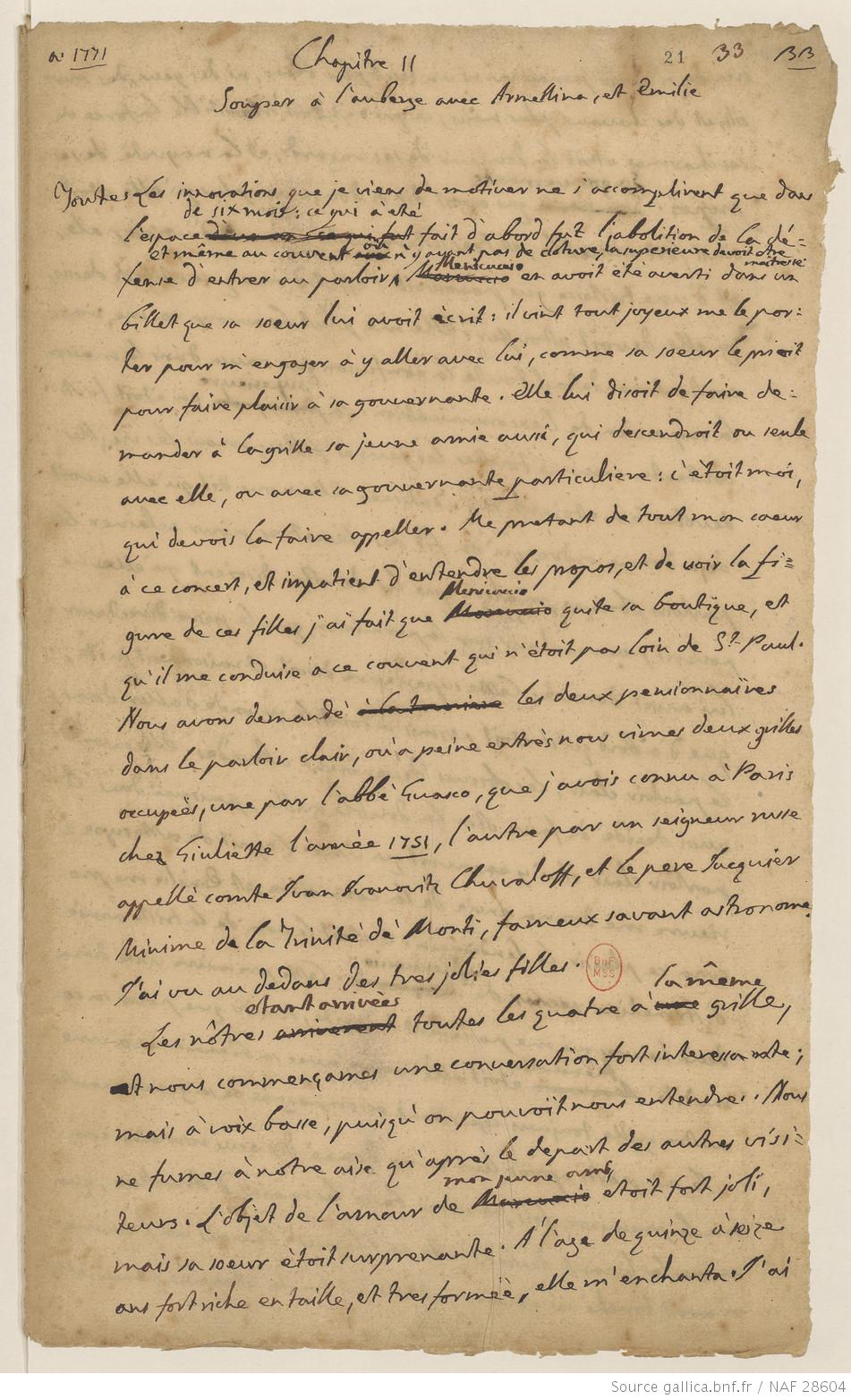
- page from the manuscript
- Author: Giacomo Casanova
- Original title: Histoire de ma vie
- Language: French
- Genre: memoir, autobiography
- Set in: Europe, 18th century
- Publication place: Kingdom of Bohemia
- Original text: Histoire de ma vie at French Wikisource

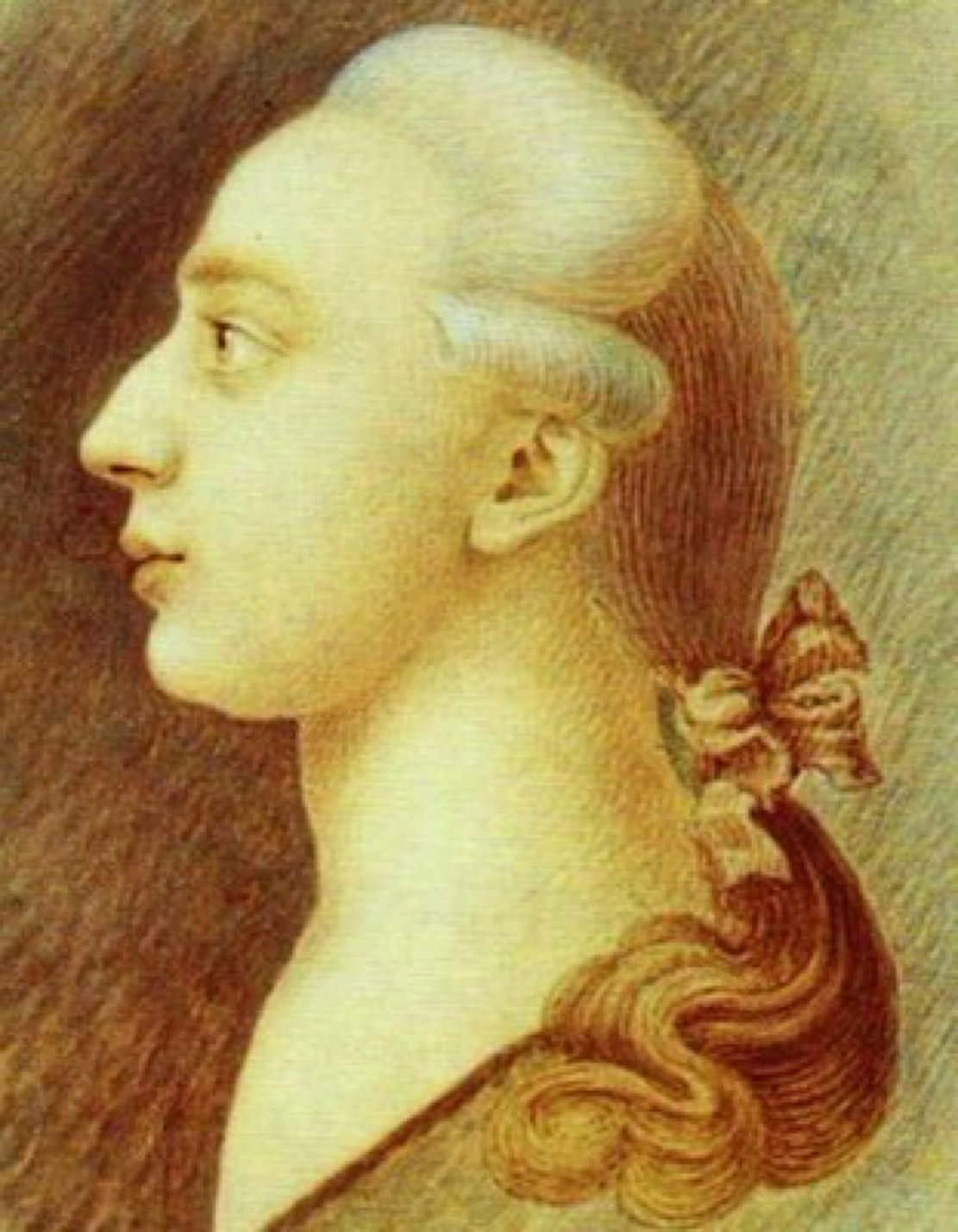
Portrait of Giacomo Casanova (made about 1750–1755) by his brother Francesco Casanova (State Historical Museum, Moscow).

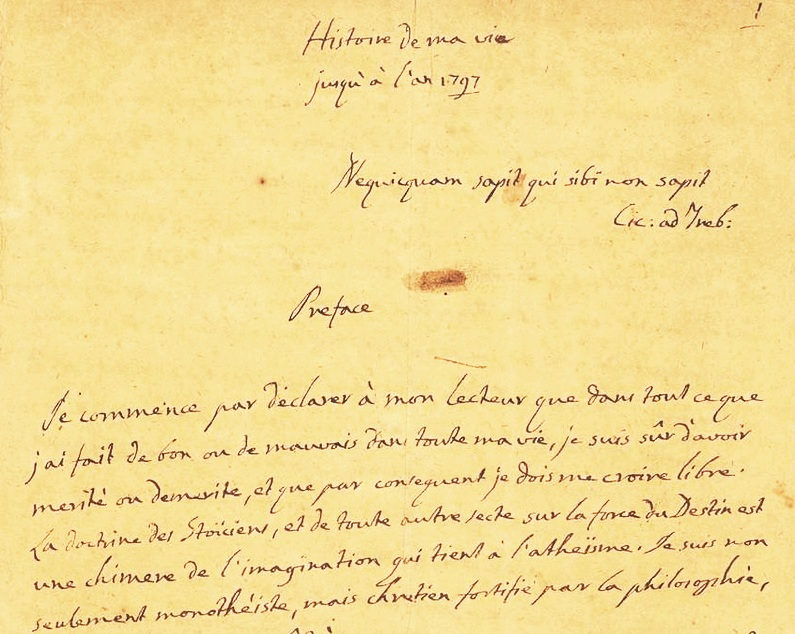
First page of Casanova's manuscript.

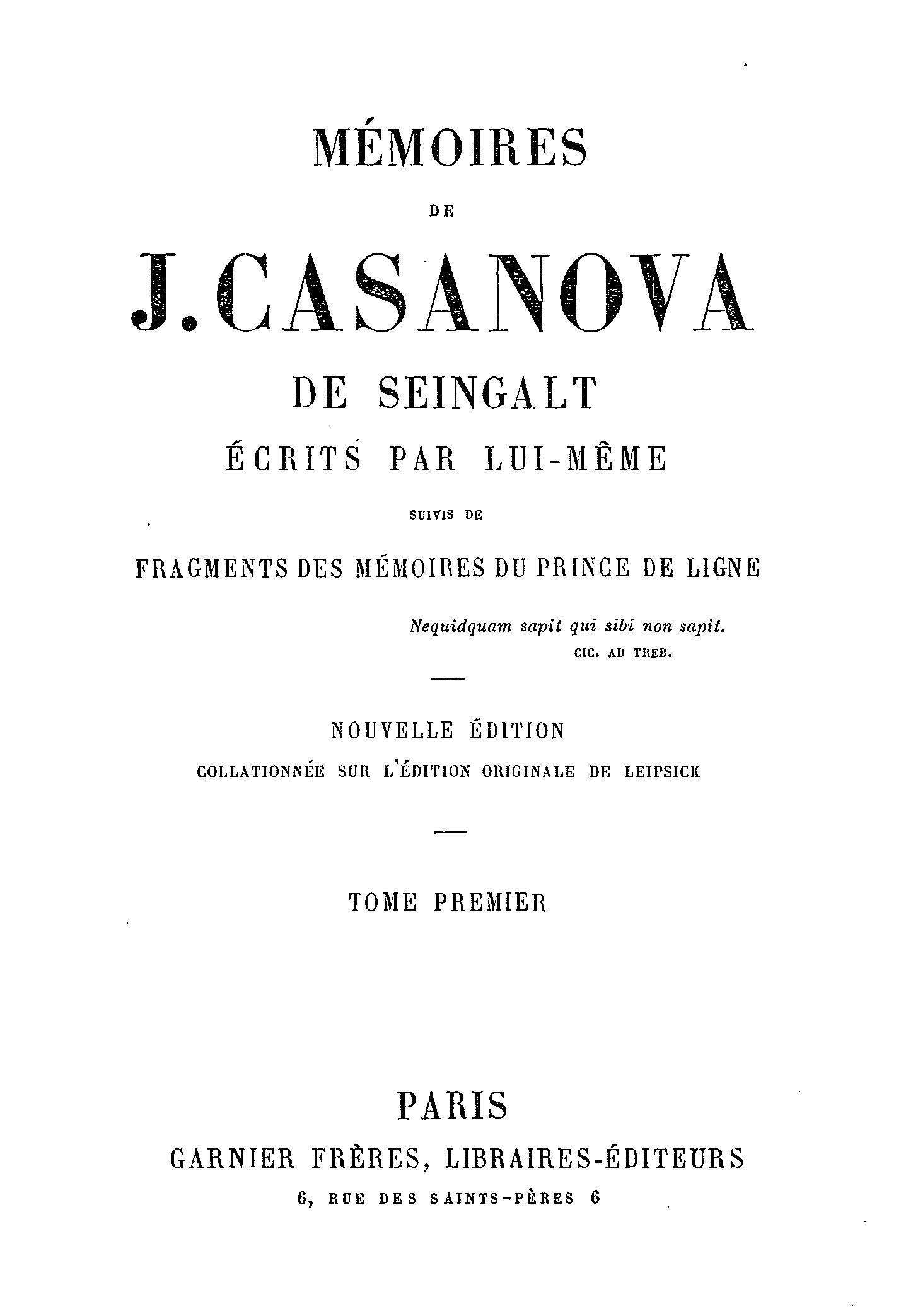
Mémoires de J. Casanova de Seingalt, écrits par lui-même

Histoire de ma vie (The Story of My Life) is both the unfinished memoir and autobiography of Giacomo Casanova, a famous 18th-century Venetian adventurer. A previous, bowdlerized version was originally known in English as The Memoirs of Jacques Casanova (from the French Mémoires de Jacques Casanova) until the original version was published between 1960 and 1962. The unexpurgated English translation was published between 1966 and 1971.

From 1838 to 1960, all the editions of the memoirs were derived from the censored editions produced in German and French in the early nineteenth century. Arthur Machen used one of these inaccurate versions for his English translation published in 1894 which remained the standard English edition for many years.

Although Casanova was Venetian, the book is written in French, which was the dominant language of the educated classes at the time. The book covers Casanova's life only through 1774, although the full title of the book is Histoire de ma vie jusqu'à l'an 1797 (History of my Life until the year 1797).

On 18 February 2010, the National Library of France purchased the 3,700-page manuscript of Histoire de ma vie for approximately €7 million (£5,750,000). The manuscript is believed to have been given to Casanova's nephew, Carlo Angiolini, in 1798. The manuscript is believed to contain pages not previously read or published. Following this acquisition, a new edition in the prestigious Bibliothèque de la Pléiade, based on the manuscript, was published from 2013 to 2015.

== Contents of the book ==
The book comprises 12 volumes and approximately 3,500 pages (1.2 million words) covering Casanova's life from his birth to 1774.

== Story of the manuscript ==
Casanova allegedly wrote the first chapters of the book in 1789, during a profound illness.

In 1794, Casanova met Charles Joseph, Prince de Ligne. The two of them established a mutual friendship. The Prince expressed a desire to read Casanova's memoirs, and Casanova decided to polish the manuscript before sending it to the Prince. After reading at least the first three tomes of the manuscript, Charles Joseph suggested that the memoir be shown to an editor in Dresden to publish in exchange for an annuity. Casanova was convinced to publish the manuscript, but chose another route. In 1797, he asked Marcolini Di Fano, minister in the Cabinet of the Saxon court, to help him with the publication.

In May 1798, Casanova was alone in Dux. He foresaw his death and asked for members of his family currently residing in Dresden to come and support him in his last moments. Carlo Angiolini, the husband of Casanova's niece, traveled without delay from Dresden to Dux. After Casanova's death, he returned to Dresden with the manuscript. Carlo himself died in 1808 and the manuscript passed to his daughter Camilla. Because of the Napoleonic Wars, the climate was not favorable for publishing the memoirs of a character belonging to a past age. After the Battle of Leipzig (1813), Marcolini remembered the manuscript and offered 2500 thalers to Camilla's tutor, who judged the offer too modest and refused.

After some years, the recession compromised the wealth of Camilla's family. She asked her brother Carlo to quickly sell the manuscript. In 1821, it was sold to the publisher Friedrich Arnold Brockhaus. Brockhaus asked Wilhelm von Schütz to translate the book into German. Some extracts of the translation and the first volume were published as early as 1822. The collaboration between Brockhaus and Schütz stopped in 1824, after the publication of the fifth volume. The other volumes were then translated by another, unknown translator.

Due to the success of the German edition, the French editor Victor Tournachon decided to publish the book in France. Tournachon had no access to the original manuscript, and so the French text of his edition was translated from the German translation. The text was heavily censored. In response to the piracy Brockhaus brought out a second edition in French, edited by Jean Laforgue (1782–1852) which was very unreliable, as Laforgue altered Casanova's religious and political views as well as censoring sexual references. The French volumes were published from 1826 to 1837. These editions were also successful, and another French pirate edition was prepared with another translation from the German edition. As the German edition was not entirely published at this time, this edition allegedly contains passages invented by the translator.

From 1838 to 1960, all the editions of the memoirs were derived from one of these editions. Arthur Machen used one of these inaccurate versions for his English translation published in 1894 which remained the standard English edition for many years.

The original manuscript was stored in the editor's head office in Leipzig until 1943, when after the closure of the office, Brockhaus himself secured them in a bank, saving them just before the 1943 bombings of Leipzig. In June 1945, it was moved to the new head office in Wiesbaden by American troops. In 1960, a collaboration between Brockhaus and the French editor Plon led to the first original edition of the manuscript.

In 2010, thanks to the support of an anonymous donor, the manuscript was purchased by the Bibliothèque nationale de France for over $9 million, the institution's most expensive acquisition to date.

== Main editions ==
=== Schütz translation (1822–1828) ===
This first edition is a censored German translation for Brockhaus (the first half was translated by Wilhelm von Schütz, the remaining parts by an unknown translator). Its "original" title is: Aus den Memoiren des Venetianers Jacob Casanova de Seingalt, oder sein Leben, wie er es zu Dux in Böhmen niederschrieb. Nach dem Original-Manuscript bearbeitet von Wilhelm von Schütz.

=== Tournachon-Molin translation (1825–1829) ===
The success of the first German edition spawns the pirate Tournachon-Molin edition, without access to the original manuscript. The first French edition is a German to French translation from the French to German Schütz translation, which results in a very approximate and imperfect text.

=== Laforgue adaptation (1826–1838) ===
In reaction to the pirate edition, Brockhaus decided to publish its own French edition. This edition was done with the original manuscript, but still heavily censored and "arranged" by Jean Laforgue. Laforgue rewrote parts of the text, and even added some others of his own. Furthermore, four chapters of the manuscript were not returned to the publisher. The edition was prepared from 1825 to 1831, but difficulties with the censors slowed the publishing of the volumes, especially after the book had been put in the list of Index Librorum Prohibitorum in 1834.

Several editions are in fact re-editions of this Laforgue edition:

- Garnier edition (1880). This is a popular and cheap edition.
- The La Sirène edition (1924–1935).
- The first Pléiade edition (1958–1960).

=== Busoni pirate edition (1833–1837) ===
The Laforgue edition success spawned a new pirate edition in France. This new edition began as a copy of the first eight published volumes of the Laforgue edition, but because the other volumes of the Laforgue edition were slow to appear (because of censorship), the publisher Paulin asked a journalist, Philippe Busoni, to take over the balance of the project. Busoni wrote the two remaining volumes using the Tournachon-Molin translation, adding new episodes he invented.

Several reeditions of the Busoni edition are:

- The Rozez reedition (1860).
- The Flammarion reedition (1871–1872).

=== The Brockhaus-Plon reference (1960–1962) ===
The manuscript remained hidden for many years because Brockhaus didn't want it to be pirated further. Then wars and economics crises slowed their edition projects until the end of the 1950s.

The first complete and authentic edition of the text was published between 1960 and 1962 (minus the 4 lost chapters, replaced by their Laforgue version with the annotations by Schütz).

=== The Éditions Robert Laffont Reedition ===
The Bouquins reedition (1993, reprinted in 1999) has since become the first French reference edition. It is a reissue of the Brockhaus-Plon and its notes, enriched with the famous notes and repertoires of the edition of the Sirène, dozens of unpublished texts from Casanova's archives, and updated with the latest Casanova discoveries. Published by Robert Laffont editions in 12 volumes in 3 tomes. Full text of the original manuscript, followed by unpublished texts. Edition presented and established by Francis Lacassin.

=== The new Pleiade edition (2013–2015) ===
Following the acquisition of the manuscript by the Bibliothèque nationale de France, a new Pléiade edition, based on the manuscript, was published from 2013 to 2015. The La Pléiade collection, published by Gallimard, offers a new edition in conformity with the original manuscript in 3 volumes published successively in 2013, 2014, and 2015. It retains Casanova's layout, punctuation and Italianisms. It is edited by Gérard Lahouati and Marie-Françoise Luna, with the collaboration of Furio Luccichenti and Helmut Watzlawick. It contains 2 prefaces, one written by Gérard Laouhati, entitled Un miroir magique (A Magic Mirror), the other written by Marie-Françoise Luna, entitled L'autre Casanova: des maîtres, des échos, des voix (The Other Casanova: the Masters, the Echoes, the Voices). This edition is enriched with footnotes that provides the translation of words or passages that may cause difficulty, the French version of Latin (or other) quotations inserted in the text and Casanova's main repentances that bear witness to his work as a writer and sometimes reveal the depth of his thoughts as well as rich endnotes.

== Additional publication history ==
- Jacques Casanova de Seingalt Vénitien, Histoire de ma vie (in French). Wiesbaden, Paris: F.A. Brockhaus; Librairie Plon. 1960. OCLC 635696012, 163781441. 12 vol. in 6; the first edition of the original text (4 lost chapters being replaced with text from the Laforgue edition), with notes coming from the Schütz edition.
- Lacassin, Francis, ed. (1993). Jacques Casanova de Seingalt, Histoire de ma vie, suivie de textes inédits (in French). Paris: Éditions Robert Laffont. ISBN 978-2-221-06520-4. OCLC 30477736. This revision of the Brockhaus-Plon edition has become the de facto reference edition.

=== Translations ===
Casanova's memoirs have been published in more than 20 languages and 400 editions, mostly in French, English, and German. The main translations are now all based on the Brockhaus-Plon reference. The only unabridged English translation based on that is by Willard R. Trask, cited below. Willard R. Trask shared the U.S. National Book Award's inaugural Award for Translated Literature for the first volume of that work.

==== English ====
- The Memoirs of Jacques Casanova ... Now for the first time translated into English. Translated by Machen, Arthur. Privately printed by Bartholomew Robson. 1894. OCLC 1346944880. This is a complete translation of the censored Laforgue text. E-book versions include:
  - The Memoirs of Jacques Casanova de Seingalt: The First Complete and Unabridged English Translation. Translated by Machen, Arthur. New York: Putnam. 1902. OCLC 1157146928 – via Internet Archive.
  - The Memoirs of Jacques Casanova de Seingalt, 1725–1798. Complete. Translated by Machen, Arthur. Project Gutenberg. 2021-06-04 [2004-11-11]. EBook-No. 2981.
- History of My Life. Translated by Trask, Willard Ropes. New York: Harcourt, Brace & World. 1966–1971. ISBN 978-0-15-141085-9. OCLC 557553. This is Trask's complete translation of the Brockhaus-Plon reference.
- The Story of My Life. Translated by Sartarelli, Stephen; Hawkes, Sophie. New York; Saint Paul, MN: Marsilio Publishers; Distributed in the U.S. by Consortium Book Sales and Distribution. 2000. ISBN 978-1-56886-063-3. OCLC 44789122. This is a concise translation of a selection from one-eighth of the Brockhaus-Plon edition of the original manuscript. Reissued by Penguin Books: OCLC 46359659, 59378537

==== German ====
- Aus den Memoiren des Venetianers Jacob Casanova de Seingalt; oder, Sein Leben, wie er es zu Dux in Böhmen niederschrieb (in German). Translated by von Schütz, Wilhelm. Leipzig: F.A. Brockhaus. 1822–1828. OCLC 609842345 – via HathiTrust. This is a censored 12 volume translation of the original manuscript that has been regularly reedited starting in 1850.
- Loos, Erich, ed. (1964–1967). Geschichte meines Lebens (in German). Translated by Sauter, Heinz. Berlin: Propyläen Verl. OCLC 58590521. This is a complete 12 volume translation of the Brockhaus-Plon edition of the original manuscript. This has been reedited starting in 1985.

==== Spanish ====
- Historia de mi vida (in Spanish). Translated by Romano Haces, Luis; Ogg, Luis. [Barcelona]: Libros y Publicaciones Periódicas. 1984. ISBN 978-84-7591-034-5. OCLC 434466360. This edition is based on the censored Laforgue version.
- Historia de mi vida (in Spanish). Translated by Armiño, Mauro. Preface by Félix de Azúa. Girona, España: Atalanta. 2009. ISBN 978-84-937247-4-0. OCLC 630188143. This is a complete translation of the Brockhaus-Plon edition of the original manuscript.

==== Italian ====
- Storia della mia vita (in Italian). Translated by Oglio, Enrico dall'; Cinti, Decio. pubblicata sotto la direzione di Gerolamo Lazzeri. Milano: Edizioni "Corbaccio". 1924–1926. OCLC 608851861 – via HathiTrust. First complete Italian translation of the censored Laforgue text. This was reedited and reissued in the 1960s:
  - Cordié, Carlo, ed. (1961–1963). Storia della mia vita (in Italian). Roma: Edizioni Cassini. OCLC 23154755.
  - Storia della mia vita (in Italian). Milano: Dall'Oglio. 1964. OCLC 13567510.
- Chiara, Piero, ed. (1964–1965). Storia della mia vita (in Italian). Milano: Mondadori. OCLC 23495079. This is a complete translation of the Brockhaus-Plon edition of the original manuscript. Reedited and reissued 1983–1989: ISBN 978-88-04-21293-5 OCLC 10323096
- Bartalini Bigi, Pietro; Grasso, Maurizio, eds. (1999). Storia della mia vita (in Italian). Roma: Grandi Tascabili Economici Newton. ISBN 978-88-8289-028-5. OCLC 875797558. Unable to confirm whether this is based on Laforgue or Brockhaus, and whether it is complete or abridged.

==== Dutch ====
Before Kars, there were translations of the Laforgue censored edition.

- De school van het leven (in Dutch). Translated by Kars, Theo. Amsterdam: Athenaeum-Polak & Van Gennep. 1991. ISBN 978-90-253-3067-5. OCLC 65686315. Republished in 2006: ISBN 978-90-253-0670-0. OCLC 150333068. This is a complete translation of the Brockhaus-Plon edition of the original manuscript, Integrale editie. Also, see Casanova's reizen at the Internet Archive.

==== Turkish ====
- Anılar [Memories] (in Turkish). İstanbul: Nisan. 1992. ISBN 978-975-7496-34-2. OCLC 66248892. This first Turkish translation is an abridgement, probably from the Laforgue version.
- Hayatım [My Life] (in Turkish). Translated by Zorlukol, Mine. İstanbul: Güncel Yayıncılık. 2004. ISBN 978-975-8621-76-7. OCLC 57653250. This first volume is a translation of the Brockhaus-Plon edition of the original manuscript. The rest of the volumes are unpublished. Of note: Hayatım is a play on words in which My Life can imply both My Biography and My Darling.

== See also ==
- Fellini's Casanova, a 1976 feature film by Federico Fellini
