= Wilhelm von Schütz =

German author and playwright (1776–1847)

Christian Wilhelm von Schütz (13 April 1776 in Berlin – 9 August 1847 in Leipzig) was a German author.

== Biography ==
Schütz was, among other things, a minor Romantic writer, who first became well-known as a playwright (with Lacrimas, in 1802). A friend of Ludwig Tieck and August Wilhelm Schlegel, he translated in 1822 Casanova's Histoire de ma vie for the 12-volume German edition of the notable memoirs. He also wrote extensively on political and philosophical topics. Notably, future Nazi propaganda minister Joseph Goebbels wrote his PhD dissertation on Schütz in 1922. From 1842 to 1846, he was the editor of the Catholic magazine Anticelsus.

== Works ==
- Lacrimas. 1803.
- Niobe. 1807.
- Rußland und Deutschland (Russia and Germany). 1819.
- Deutschlands Preßgesetz (German Press Law). 1821.
- Zur intellectuellen und substantiellen Morphologie (For an intellectual and substantial morphology). 1821 - 1823.
- Lücken der deutschen Philosophie (Gaps in the German philosophy). 1837.
- Über die preußische Rechtsansicht wegen der gemischten Ehen (About the Prussian legal opinion on mixed marriages). 1839.
