= Stephen Thomas Knight =

Australian academic (born 1940)

Stephen Thomas Knight FAHA, FEA (born 21 September 1940) is an Australian academic. He was, until September 2011, a distinguished research professor in English literature at Cardiff University; and is a professorial fellow of Literature at the University of Melbourne. His areas of expertise include medieval English and European literature, Robin Hood, Merlin, cultural studies, crime fiction, and Australian matters. He has authored over thirty books, and is well known in the public sphere for his contribution to a range of fields. His most recent books have been The Politics of Myth (2015), Towards Sherlock Holmes: A Thematic History of Crime Fiction in the 19th Century World (2017), Australian Crime Fiction: A 200-year History (2018), The Fiction of G.W.M. Reynolds: The Man Who Outsold Dickens (2019) and The University is Closed for Open Day: Themes and Scenes from 21st Century Australia (2019).

== Biography ==
Knight was educated at Bournemouth Grammar School and at Jesus College, Oxford. He graduated in 1962 and was appointed to the University of Sydney in 1963. In 1968–69 he was lecturer in English at the Australian National University, and he returned to the University of Sydney in 1970, where he was senior lecturer and associate professor. In 1986 he was appointed Robert Wallace Professor of English at the University of Melbourne, and in 1992 returned to Britain to the first chair of English at the new De Montfort University in Leicester. In 1994, he moved to a position at Cardiff University as professor and head of English; he was also head of the School of English, Philosophy and Communication, and from 2006 was appointed distinguished research professor. Knight is a Fellow of the Australian Academy of the Humanities, a Fellow of the English Association, and a Cyfaill y Celtiaid, or "Fellow of the Celts".

Much of Knight's scholarly writings have been in the areas of medieval English literature, Robin Hood, Merlin and the Arthurian myth. His long-standing interest in crime fiction generated the study Form and Ideology in Crime Fiction (1980), and several other books and essay-collections, including Continent of Mystery: A Thematic History of Australian Crime Fiction (1997), for which he was awarded the Ned Kelly Lifetime Achievement Award. He has also written sociocultural commentaries, notably The Selling of the Australian Mind (1990), Freedom Was Compulsory (1994), and a new set of socio-critical Australian essays The University is Closed for Open Day (2019).

== Major works ==
=== Robin Hood: A Mythic Biography ===
This book, which won the 2005 International Mythopoeic Society Award for Non-Fiction, traces the origins of the myth, providing insights into why Robin Hood is still such an essential and evolving figure in culture and literature. Knight presents the detailed elements and contexts of the Robin Hood myth, as he explores its changing representations and conceptions.

"To study Robin Hood," as Knight says, "is to study over five hundred years of the development of modern concepts of heroism, art, politics, and the self. It is an exciting and enthralling domain of study, that can in itself become a guide to the changing patterns and dynamics of society and culture over an enormous period."

=== A Hundred Years of Fiction: Writing Wales in English ===
After becoming Professor and Head of English at Cardiff University, Wales, Knight introduced the department's first courses in Welsh fiction in English and then produced in 2004 the first book written on this topic.

=== Merlin: Knowledge and Power Through the Ages ===
This book traces the myth of Merlin back to its earliest roots in the early Welsh figure of Myrddin and he then follows Merlin as he is re-imagined through centuries of literature and art, beginning with Geoffrey of Monmouth, whose immensely popular Latin History of the Kings of Britain (c. 1136) transmitted the story of Merlin to Europe at large. The book covers French and German as well as Anglophone elements of the myth and brings the story up to the present with discussions of a globalised Merlin who finds his way into popular literature, film, television, and New Age philosophy.

=== The Mysteries of the Cities: Urban Crime Fiction in the Nineteenth Century ===
This study describes the lengthy popular fictions that responded to the new, exciting and alarming experience of city life in the mid nineteenth century. Starting with Eugène Sue's Les Mystères de Paris (1842-3) it shows how young authors, working for newspapers and street level publishers, did not use the new power of detectives or the old patterns of aristocratic and moral control, and simply realised the multiple, overlapping, chaotic and often violent stories of modern urban crime. The mode was picked up by George W. M. Reynolds in The Mysteries of London (1844-8), and was also imitated in multiple American versions, of which the most impressive are George Lippard's The Quaker City, or The Monks of Monk Hall (1845), about Philadelphia, and The Mysteries of New York (1848) by E. C. Z. Judson (better known as 'Ned Buntline')..

The Mysteries genre spread around the world – including to Berlin, St Petersburg, Milan, and many American urban centres: the last true realisation was in gold-rich Melbourne in 1873, when Donald Cameron produced The Mysteries of Melbourne Life.

Knight shows how this material expresses and examines the drama of new megalopolitan life, how it influenced authors who sometimes claimed not to admire it such as Victor Hugo, Charles Dickens and Émile Zola, and how this genre is a massively overlooked storehouse of story, melodrama and above all urban emotional history.

=== The Politics of Myth: Social Meanings from King Arthur to Ned Kelly ===
This book argues that major myths represent a set of forces and challenges that remain relevant across time and are reworked and reinterpreted in new social contexts. Knight looks at real and mythical figures such as Guinevere, Elizabeth I, Jeanne d’Arc, Ned Kelly, Robin Hood and Shakespeare.

=== Towards Sherlock Holmes: A Thematic History of Crime Fiction in the 19th Century World. ===
Knight explores the issues and socio-cultural domains that are dealt with in the crime fiction that led to – and continued through—the dominating myth of Sherlock Holmes.

=== Australian Crime Fiction: A 200-Year History ===
In 1997 Knight published Continent of Mystery: A Thematic History of Australian Crime Fiction, a study of the genre up to 1995 which focused on separate themes, with chapters on Origins, Women, Police, Place, and Colonial/Post-Colonial. The new book differs by being a formal history of the genre, with much wider reference to authors and their contexts; it also discusses the many authors who have emerged since 1995 in the new flourishing of the genre in Australia.

=== G.W.M. Reynolds and His Fiction: The Man Who Outsold Dickens ===
Having published in The Mysteries of the Cities (2012) a chapter on George W. M. Reynolds' The Mysteries of London (1844–48), Knight grew interested in this hugely popular author of thirty-six novels, several of them multi-volume, and over twenty million words of fiction in all. Reynolds has been almost completely ignored by English literary criticism, in part because of his popular status, but also because of his politics: he was a Chartist and general supporter of the lower social orders, especially seeking their improved education. Much disliked by Dickens, largely for his radicalism, he in return called Dickens an 'aristocratic lickspittle'. This book, surveying his novels and novellas, is the first written on him.

== Media ==
Knight has appeared in the media many times, producing reviews for newspapers, magazines and radio, including for ten years from the mid-1970s a monthly column in The Sydney Morning Herald on crime fiction. He has also written radio reviews and features and has appeared on Melvyn Bragg's BBC Radio 4 programme In Our Time, discussing Robin Hood, Merlin, and the legend of the Fisher King, as well as on the 2006 BBC television production World of Robin Hood, with Jonathan Ross. He has done a range of interviews on The Politics of Myth (2015).

He received media attention across the world in 1999 through his commentary in London's The Sunday Times relating to gender roles in the Robin Hood legend, which some elements of the media took to be evidence that Robin Hood was gay.

== Bibliography ==
=== Select bibliography ===
- Knight, Stephen (1972) Rymyng Craftily: Meaning in Chaucer’s Poetry. Sydney : Angus and Robertson.
- Knight, Stephen (1973) The Poetry of the Canterbury Tales. Sydney : Angus and Robertson.
- Knight, Stephen (1980) Form and Ideology in Crime Fiction. London : Macmillan.
- Knight, Stephen (1983) Arthurian Literature and Society. London : Macmillan.
- Knight, Stephen (1986) Geoffrey Chaucer. Oxford : Blackwell.
- Knight, Stephen (1990) The Selling of the Australian Mind: From First Fleet to Third Mercedes. Melbourne : Heinemann.
- Knight, Stephen (1994) Robin Hood: A Complete Study of the English Outlaw. Oxford : Blackwell.
- Knight, Stephen (1994) Freedom Was Compulsory. Melbourne : Minerva.
- Knight, Stephen (1997) Continent of Mystery: A Thematic History of Australian Crime Fiction. Melbourne : Melbourne University Press.
- Knight, Stephen (Ed) (1998) Robin Hood: The Forresters Manuscript. Cambridge : Brewer.
- Knight, Stephen & Gustav Klaus (Eds) (2000) British Industrial Fictions. Cardiff : University of Wales Press.
- Knight, Stephen (2003) Robin Hood: A Mythic Biography. Ithaca and London : Cornell University Press.
- Knight, Stephen (2004) A Hundred Years of Fiction: Writing Wales in English. Cardiff : University of Wales Press.
- Knight, Stephen (2004) Crime Fiction, 1800–2000: Detection, Death, Diversity. London : Palgrave Macmillan.
- Knight, Stephen (2009) Merlin: Knowledge and Power Through the Ages. Ithaca : Cornell University Press.
- Knight, Stephen (2012) The Mysteries of the Cities: Urban Crime Fiction in the Nineteenth Century. Jefferson NC : McFarland.
- Knight, Stephen (Ed) (2012) Robin Hood in Greenwood Stood: Alterity and Context in the English Outlaw Myth. Turnhout : Brepols.
- Knight, Stephen (2014) Secrets of Crime Fiction Classics: Detecting the Delights of 21 Enduring Stories. Jefferson, NC : McFarland.
- Knight, Stephen & Maurizio Ascari (Eds) (2015) Romantic Sublime to Detective Crime. Monaco : LiberFaber.
- Knight, Stephen (2015) Reading Robin Hood: Content, Form and Reception in the Outlaw Myth. Manchester : Manchester University Press.
- Knight, Stephen (2015) The Politics of Myth: Social Meanings from King Arthur to Ned Kelly. Melbourne : Melbourne University Press.
- Knight, Stephen (2017) Towards Sherlock Holmes: A Thematic History of Crime Fiction in the 19th Century World. Jefferson, NC: McFarland.
- Knight, Stephen (2018) Australian Crime Fiction: A 200-Year History. Jefferson, NC: McFarland.
- Knight, Stephen (2019) G.W.M. Reynolds and His Fiction: The Man Who Outsold Dickens. New York and London: Routledge.
- Knight, Stephen (2019) The University is Closed for Open Day: Themes and Scenes from 21st Century Australia. Melbourne: Melbourne University Press.

=== Related works ===
- Evans, Fulton & Matthews (Eds.) (2006) Medieval Cultural Studies: Essays in Honour of Stephen Knight. Cardiff : University of Wales Press.
