= Joseph Wilmot; or, the Memoirs of a Man-Servant =

Victorian penny-dreadful novel by George W. M. Reynolds

Joseph Wilmot; or, The Memoirs of a Man-Servant
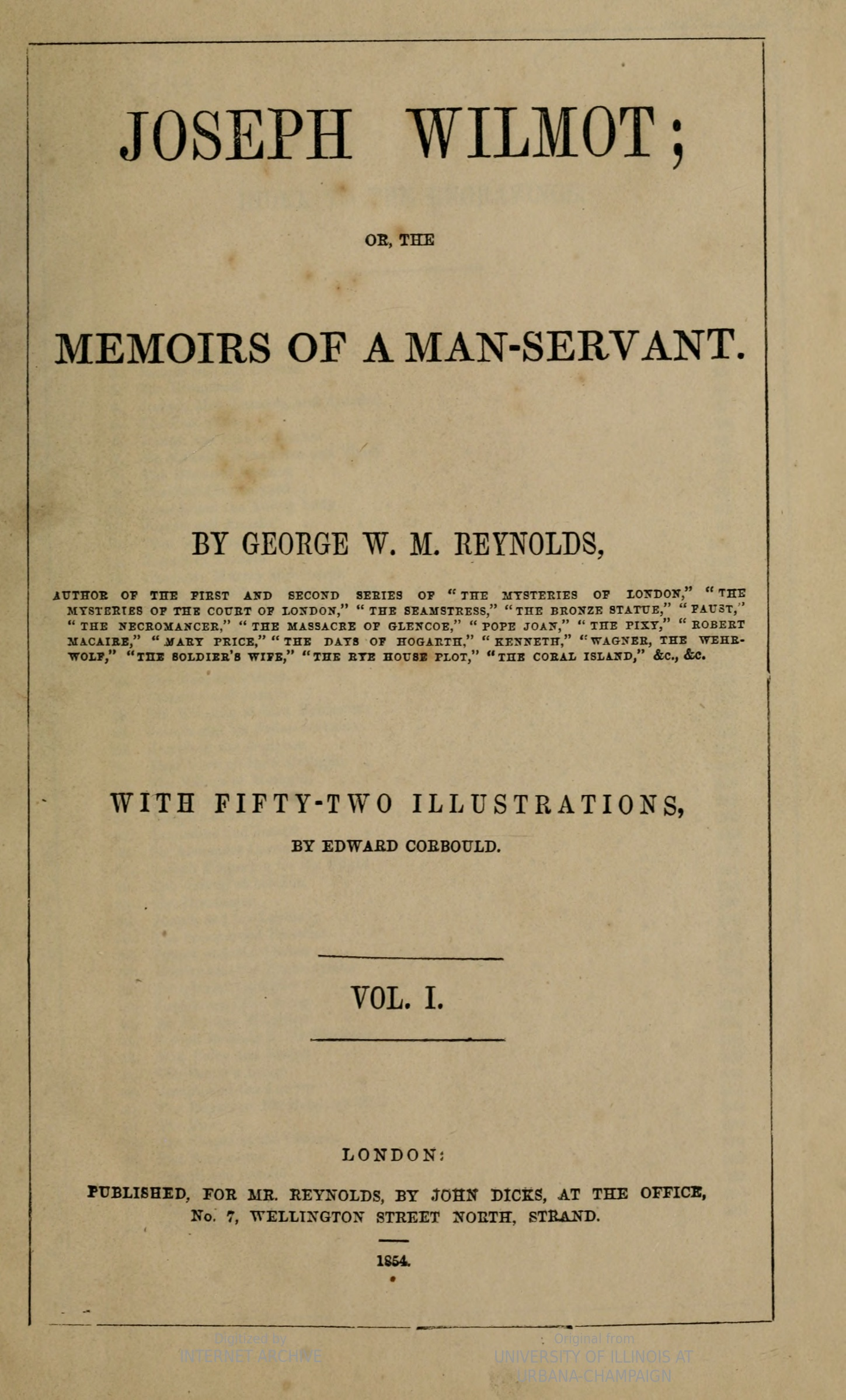
- Title page of first volume of first edition of Joseph Wilmot
- Author: George W. M. Reynolds
- Illustrator: Edward Henry Corbould
- Language: English
- Genre: Social novel
- Publisher: John Dicks
- Publication date: 1854–55
- Publication place: United Kingdom
- Media type: Print (serial and 2 vols.)

Joseph Wilmot; or, the Memoirs of a Man-Servant is a Victorian novel by the British writer George W. M. Reynolds. It was first serialized in weekly parts from 29 July 1853 to 4 July 1855, and later published in volumes between 1854 and 1855.

== Synopsis ==
Joseph Wilmot is told in the first person. This novel tells the story of the orphaned Joseph Wilmot, who as the result of a complicated conspiracy, is left to fend for himself in a hostile world, armed with nothing but his native intelligence. As in most of Reynolds's novels, the hero's struggles illustrate the evils of contemporary society and of human nature, in whose goodness Reynolds never had much faith. The novel conclude with a fairytale ending, when Joseph is revealed to be the heir to a title and fortune.

== Adaptations and translations ==
Between 1862 and 1874, Hawaiian newspapers produced three different serial versions of Joseph Wilmot. The first attempt, "He Kaaо nо Iosepa Wilamata" (A Story Regarding Joseph Wilmot) ran for nine instalments in Ko Hoku o Ka Pakipika between December 1862 and February 1863. This version omitted chapters, changed characters' names (such as Annabel to Adelaine, promoted social ranks (Mr. Delmar as "Lii Haku Delama"), and introduced characters much earlier than in the English edition. It also shifted the story from first-person narrative to third person, emphasizing adventure over introspection. Another Hawaiian newspaper, Ke Au Okoa later began translations twice. The first, in January 1866, "Ka Moolelo no Iosepa Wilimata", lasted only four numbers. Like Ko Hoku version, it was told in the third person, but even with greater liberties, including a radically altered time frame. A final Hawaiian version of Joseph Wilmot appeared on December 12, 1872, titled "He Moolelo no losepa Wilimota, Unuhi'a mai ka Buke mai a G. W. M. Reynolds, He Moolelo Walohia". Unlike earlier unfinished serials in the Ko Hoku o Ka Pakipika and Ke Au Okoa, this edition claimed to be a faithful, complete translation from Reynolds's English original work. An obituary in Ka Nupepa Kuokoa (June 1876) later named George W. Kanhua ('He Eehia') as the translator.

Between 1871 and 1873 Bengali writer Bhubanchandra Mukhopadhyay adapted Reynolds's Joseph Wilmot under the title "Ei Ek Nutan! Āmār Guptakathā!!" (This is a New One! My Secrets!!). From 1888 to 1889 the novel appeared again in a straight translation as "Bilāti Guptakathā", and later in 1904 in a reworking titled Haridāser Guptakathā, featuring a Bengali protagonist Haridās.

Afsar Siddiqui Amrohvi translated the novel into Urdu in four parts, titled Joseph Wilmot, which were published from The General Book Depot, Amroha. Another Urdu translation was rendered by Tirath Ram Ferozepuri under the title "Gardish-e-Āfāq" in 28 volumes, published by Lāl brothers, Lahore.
