= List of newspapers in Hawaii =

This is a list of newspapers in Hawaii.

== Daily and weekly newspapers (currently published) ==
- The Garden Island - Lihue
- Hawaii Catholic Herald
- Hawaii Tribune-Herald
- Honolulu Star-Advertiser
- Mauitime - Wailuku
- The Maui News - Wailuku
- Molokai Advertiser-News
- Pacific Business News
- West Hawaii Today

== University newspapers ==
- Ka Leo O Hawaii - University of Hawaii at Manoa
- Ke Kalahea - University of Hawaii at Hilo and Hawaii Community College

== Defunct ==
- Hawaii Hochi (1912-2023)
- Hawaii Holomua (Honolulu) (1891–1895)
- Hawaiian Gazette (1865-1918)
- Hawaii Island Journal
- Hilo Tribune (1895–1917)
- The Honolulu Advertiser (1856–2010)
- Honolulu Record
- Honolulu Star-Bulletin (1882–2010)
- Honolulu Weekly
- Ka Nupepa Kuokoa
- Ko Hoku o Ka Pakipika (1861-1863)
- Molokai Island Times (2004-2008)
- Pacific Commercial Advertiser (Honolulu) (1856–1888)
- Polynesian (Honolulu) (1844–1864)

== See also ==
Comprehensive

- Lists of newspapers
- List of newspapers in the United States

Frequency

- List of free daily newspapers in the United States
- List of weekly newspapers in the United States

Circulation

- List of international newspapers originating in the United States
- List of national newspapers in the United States
- List of newspapers in the United States by circulation
- List of newspapers serving cities over 100,000 in the United States

Foreign language

- List of French-language newspapers published in the United States
- List of German-language newspapers published in the United States
- List of Spanish-language newspapers published in the United States

Specialty

- List of African-American newspapers in the United States
- List of alternative weekly newspapers in the United States
- List of business newspapers in the United States
- List of family-owned newspapers in the United States
- List of Jewish newspapers in the United States
- List of LGBTQ periodicals in the United States
- List of student newspapers in the United States
- List of supermarket tabloids in the United States
- List of underground press in the United States

Other

- List of defunct newspapers of the United States
