= Jules Lermina =

French writer (1839–1915)

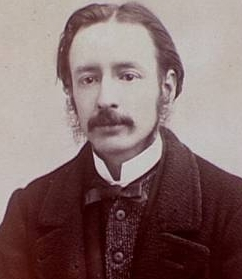
Jules Lermina

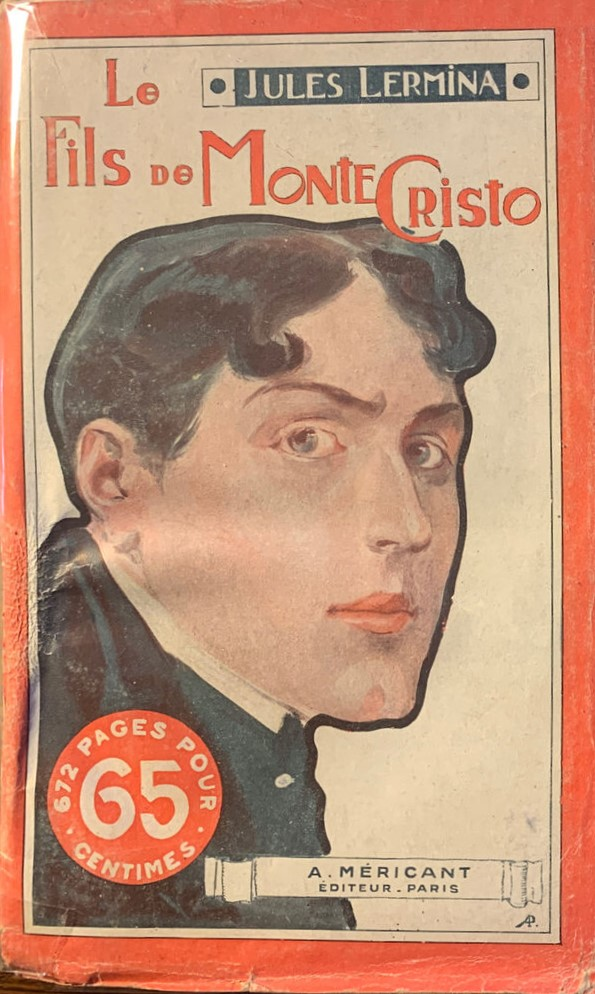
Le Fils de Monte-Cristo (1881)

Jules Lermina (27 March 1839 – 23 June 1915) was a French novelist, journalist and political activist. He began his career as a journalist in 1859, and aligned himself with the socialists, which earned him several years in prison, and also the support of Victor Hugo.

His first novels appeared under the pseudonym of William Cobb. He published extensively in his lifetime, and his works include adventure novels, including popular sequels to The Mysteries of Paris (Eugène Sue) and The Count of Monte Cristo (Alexandre Dumas}, as well as detective novels, stories inspired by his interest in the occult, a biographical dictionary and a dictionary of French slang (argot).

== Biography ==
After working in various jobs and unsuccessfully attempting to start his own business, he began a career in journalism in 1859 and became involved with the socialists, which led to several prison terms and the support of Victor Hugo.

His first novels were published under the pseudonym William Cobb. He left behind a prolific body of work, including adventure novels, notably sequels to Eugène Sue's The Mysteries of Paris and Alexandre Dumas The Count of Monte Cristo, as well as detective novels, tales inspired by his interest in the occult sciences, a biographical dictionary, and a dictionary of slang.

He is also the author of L'ABC du libertaire (The ABCs of Libertarianism), published by the libertarian colony L'Essai d'Aiglemont, and writes for the newspaper Le Libertaire . He is therefore sometimes described as an “Anarchism.”
