= Agnes; or, Beauty and Pleasure =

1857 novel by George W. M. Reynolds

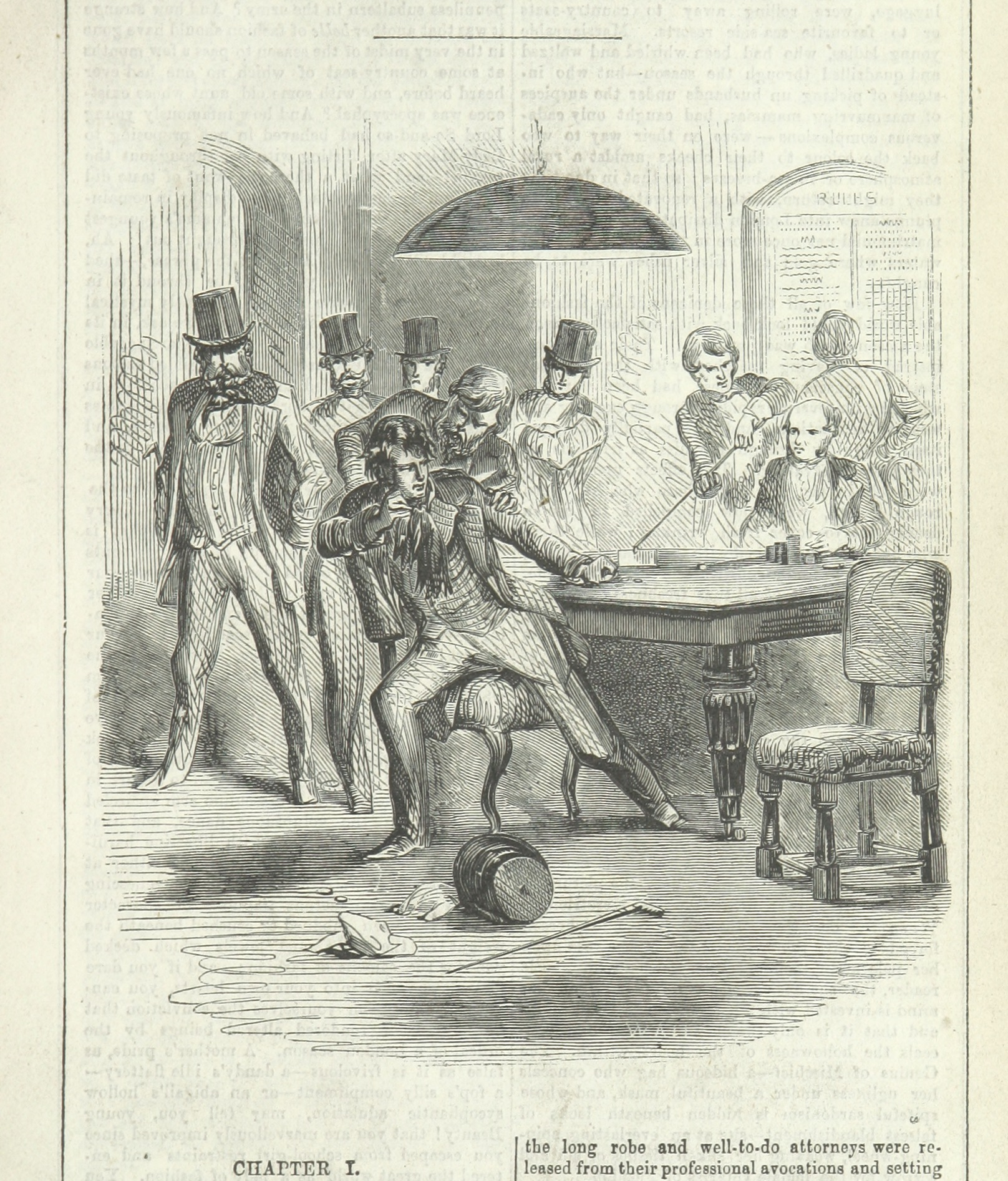
- Agnes; or Beauty and Pleasure, vol. I, pg. 13
- Author: George W. M. Reynolds
- Language: English
- Publisher: John Dicks
- Publication date: 1857
- Publication place: United Kingdom
- Media type: Print (serial and 2 vols.)

Agnes; or, Beauty and Pleasure is a novel by George W. M. Reynolds, originally serialized from 12 December 1855 to January 1857 and later published in two volumes by John Dicks in London (1857).

== Synopsis ==
The story centers on two girl cousins whose contrasting lives embody the themes of "Beauty" and "Pleasure". The cousin associated with "Pleasure" wanders across Europe in often questionable circumstances, while the cousin identified as "Beauty", Agnes, remains at home. Her role is defined by waiting for the return of her beloved, who is traveling through Europe in search of answers to the mystery of his own birth.

== Publication ==
The complete title of the novel is Agnes Evelyn; or, Beauty and Pleasure. Montague Summers records it as Agnes or, Beauty and Pleasure, issued in 104 penny numbers in 1854 and 1855. Roorbach's bibliography lists the work between 1855 and 1858 as published by T. B. Peterson (US). The 1857 date is taken from British Museum Catalogue and The Cambridge Bibliography of English Literature.

== Translations ==
Tirath Ram Ferozepuri produced an Urdu translation of Agnes; or, Beauty and Pleasure under the title "Ghuroor-e-Husn" (The Pride of Beauty). The work was issued in 28 volumes comprising a total of 3,028 pages. It was first published in Lahore by Lāl Brothers before 1939, and later republished in 1942 by Asia Book Depot, Lahore.
