= Antonio Bresciani (writer) =

Italian Jesuit writer (1798–1862)

The Reverend Antonio Bresciani
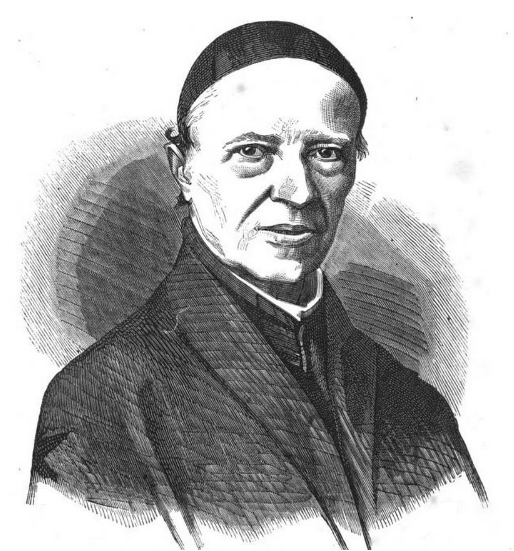
- Illustration of Bresciani
- Born: Antonio Bresciani Borsa; 24 July 1798; Ala, Trentino, Holy Roman Empire
- Died: 14 March 1862 (aged 63); Rome, Papal States
- Resting place: Church of the Gesù, Rome
- Occupations: Jesuit; novelist; journalist
- Parent(s): Leonardo Bresciani and Vittoria Bresciani (née Alberti)
- Writing career
- Pen name: Tionide Nemesiano
- Language: Italian
- Period: 1838–1862
- Genres: Novel; feuilleton
- Notable work: L'Ebreo di Verona
- Movements: linguistic purism; Romanticism

Signature
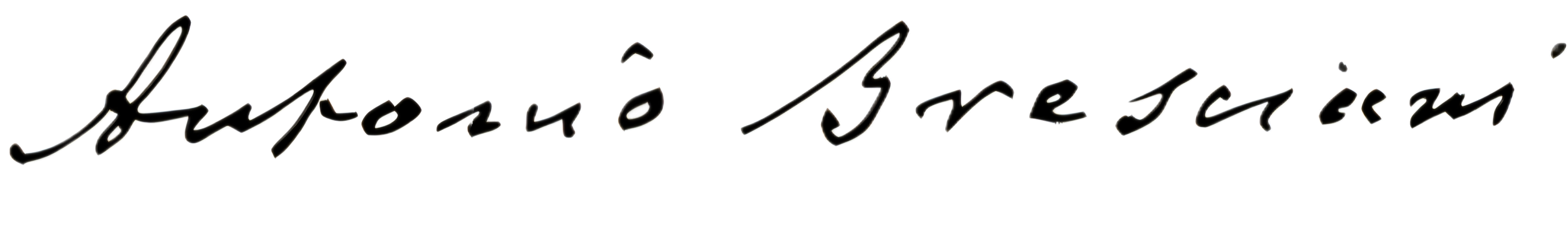

Antonio Bresciani Borsa (Italian pronunciation: [anˈtɔːnjo breʃˈʃaːni ˈborsa]; 24 July 1798 – 14 March 1862) was an Italian Jesuit, novelist and journalist, known for his opposition to liberalism and the Risorgimento.

== Biography ==
Antonio Bresciani was born into an impoverished noble family in Ala, near Trento, in 1798. In 1814, he moved to Verona and attended the St. Sebastian College. Following the completion of his studies there, in 1818 he joined the Seminary of Verona, where he studied theology. Ignoring his father's wishes that he become a lawyer, he was ordained priest in Brixen in 1821. Once ordained, he travelled to Rome with the intention of entering the Society of Jesus. In 1824, he was admitted to the Jesuit novitiate of St. Andrew. In 1826, Bresciani gained his father's permission to enter the Jesuit order and in 1828 he made his religious vows as a Jesuit in the house of novitiate in Chieri. Then he was sent to Genoa to the Jerome's Academy. Between 1834 and 1848 as rector, he moved from one college to another around Italy: in 1834 at the Carmine College in Turin, in 1837 at the College of St. Bartholomew in Modena and in 1846 at the Pontificio Collegio Urbano de Propaganda Fide.

On 9 January 1850, he was invited to Naples to take part in the first meeting of the editorial board of the review La Civiltà Cattolica. His task was to write novels. When he joined the founders of La Civiltà Cattolica Bresciani already had a large literary production and was a member of the prestigious Academy of Arcadia, under the pseudonym Tionide Nemesiano.

During his tenure as literary editor at La Civiltà Cattolica, Bresciani launched his serialised trilogy of novels: The Jew of Verona (1851), The Roman Republic and Lionello (1855). All of them became bestsellers. They dramatised how Freemasonry and related sects were working in secret to bring about anarchy, Christianity's destruction and Satan's triumph.

The typical elements of the feuilleton-novel, such as police intrigue, murder, rape, love, and betrayal were all central themes in Bresciani's novels. The Risorgimento was portrayed as the result of a "satanistically inspired conspiracy by secret societies". Liberals and nationalists would bring "moral corruption, political disorder and devil worship". The secularism and liberalism of the French Revolution and the Risorgimento were connected to Protestantism and pinned to the heinous motives of a foreign occupation and invasion. Bresciani supported a united Italy but opposed the violent, secular, or revolutionary path of the Risorgimento. Instead, he upheld a neo-Guelph political stance: "We love Italy, but we'd like her to be modest, kind, gentle, learned, industrious, but above all Catholic and respectful of the Holy See, mother and teacher of true believers."

Before dying, Bresciani had likely coined the Italian word for the revolver rivoltella.

Antonio Bresciani published extensively on socio-economic issues in La Civiltà Cattolica. He died in Rome on 14 March 1862, at the age of 63. His complete works in seventeen volumes were edited in 1869 by Civiltà Cattolica.

== Works ==
Antonio Bresciani was a prolific writer and a novelist. His novels were published in serial form in the feuilleton section of La Civiltà Cattolica — at that time the paper with the widest circulation in Italy, with more than 60,000 subscribers.

Bresciani had understood that to keep Italian youth close to the Catholic Church it was not enough to provide lives of the saints, catechisms and moral literature, but full scale 'lay' novels whose religious content was far more subtly inserted.

The dominant tone of Bresciani's fiction was polemical. The villains represented the forces of Jacobinism, the secret societies of the early Risorgimento, and Freemasonry. Conspiracy was a constant theme. The leitmotifs of anti-Jesuit polemic depicting the Society of Jesus as an occult conspiratorial organization were in turn deployed by the Jesuit writer against Freemasonry. Bresciani's theories posited a satanic conspiracy among secret societies and Jews to undermine the Christian order.

His novel L'Ebreo di Verona, published in the first six volumes of Civiltà Cattolica from 1850 to 1851, was enormously popular and was quickly translated into most European languages, including English, French, German, and Portuguese. The novel went through at least seventeen editions from ten publishers in five cities. According to some scholars, his popular novel L'Ebreo di Verona shaped religious antisemitism for decades in Italy, as did his work for La Civiltà Cattolica. The title of the novel is an ironic reference to the anti-Jesuit novel by Eugène Sue, The Wandering Jew, a favorite among Italian liberals. L'Ebreo di Verona treated the influence of secret societies during the Italian Revolution of 1848, revealing the presence of dark Masonic forces working behind the scenes to foment the nationalist movements that would erupt into mass revolt.

In 1850, Bresciani published an ethnographic book in two volumes, Dei costumi dell'isola di Sardegna, comparing the Sardinian life and customs with the “oldest oriental peoples.” Bresciani's comparison relied mainly on the Bible, Homer, Herodotus and other ancient historians, but also on the works of modern scholars, such as Bochart and Vico.

== Literary style ==
Bresciani was a polished literary prose writer. A follower of Antonio Cesari, the most renowned among Italian purists, Bresciani was a staunch opponent of Romanticism, that he considered an outgrowth of liberal, revolutionary ideology. In a treatise on Romanticism (1839), he asserted: “Romanticism is not natural in itself ... is not natural to Italian taste ... [and] is harmful to the Christian religion, to good political regimen and to morality”. Despite his anti-Romantic stance, however, Bresciani's fiction betrayed many influences from the Romantic culture of the Risorgimento that he claimed to despise.

Literary critic Francesco de Sanctis wrote that Bresciani expropriated revolutionary language for the cause of reaction, in a harshly critical review of Bresciani's novels. Bresciani's style was admired by several Italian writers, including Alfredo Panzini, who, in a passage of his Vita di Cavour [Life of Cavour], called the Jesuit father "a powerful narrator." Marxist intellectual Antonio Gramsci used the terms "Brescianism" and "Father Bresciani's progeny" to describe literature of a conservative and populist bent. Gramsci described Bresciani as a paradigm example of a particular type of Italian intellectual characterized by a reactionary attitude towards modernity. Gramsci draws a parallel between Bresciani's reaction to 1848 and that of the bourgeois press to the October Revolution.

== In fiction ==
Bresciani served as an inspiration for the creation of Father Bergamaschi, one of the main characters of Umberto Eco's novel The Prague Cemetery.

== Selected works ==
- Vita del giovane egiziano Abulcher Bisciarah. Rome: tipografia del Collegio Urbano. 1838.
- L'Ebreo di Verona, 4 vols., Bologna: Presso Marsigli e Rocchi, 1850–51.
- Della Repubblica Romana. Appendice a L'Ebreo di Verona, 2 vols., Milan, 1855.
- Lorenzo o il coscritto, racconto ligure. Milan: Boniardi-Pogliani. 1856.
- Ubaldo ed Irene: racconti storici dal 1790 al 1814. Naples: Andrea Festa. 1858.
- La contessa Matilde di Canossa e Iolanda di Groninga. Milan: tip. e libr. arcivescovile. 1858.
- La casa di ghiaccio o il cacciatore di Vincennes. Milan: Boniardi-Pogliani. 1861.
- Olderico, ovvero Il zuavo pontificio, racconto del 1860. Naples: Giannini. 1862.
- Lionello o delle Società Segrete (sequel to La Repubblica Romana).
- L'assedio di Ancona (unfinished)
