= Roorbach =

Roorbach is a surname. Notable people with the surname include:

- Bill Roorbach (born 1953), American novelist, short story writer, memoirist, journalist, blogger and critic
- Eloise Roorbach (1868–1961), American artist, writer, editor and critic
- Orville Augustus Roorbach (1803–1861), American publisher and bibliographer
