= The Wandering Jew (Sue novel) =

1844 novel by Eugène Sue

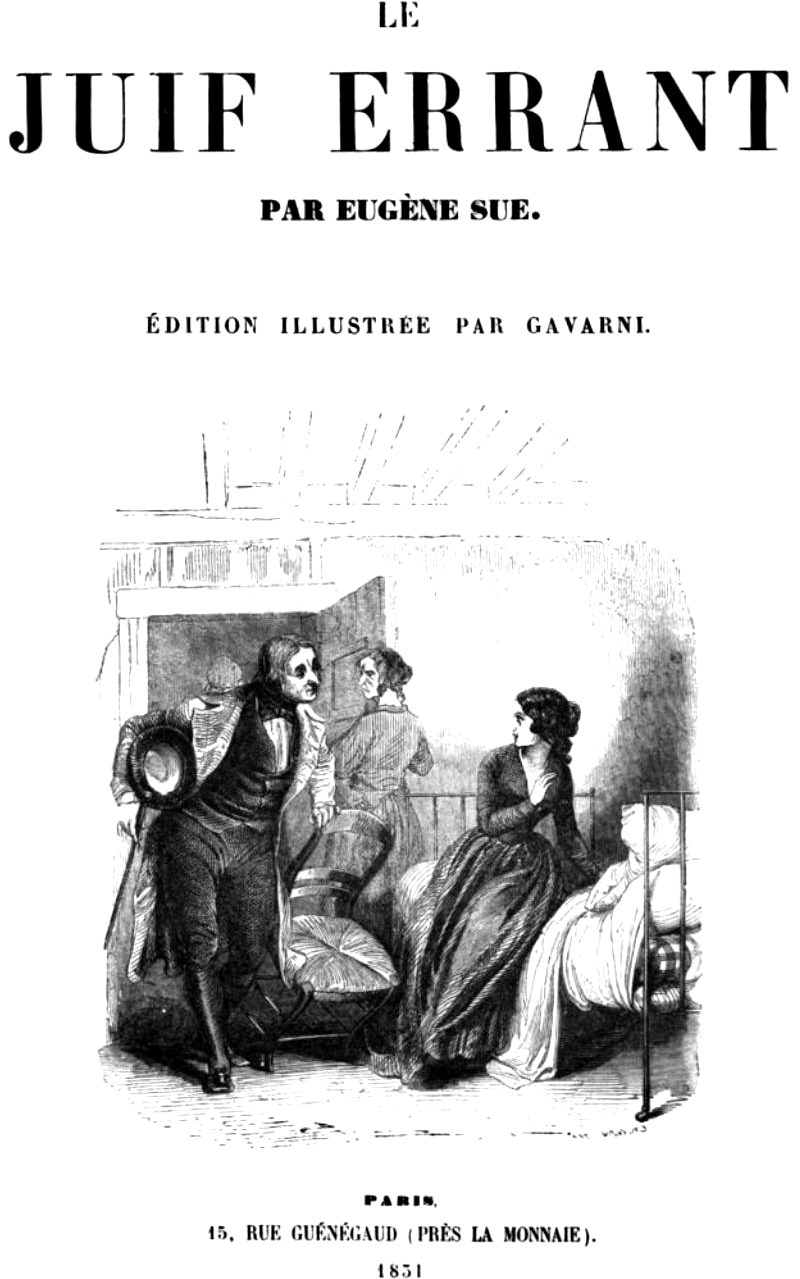
- Title page of an 1851 edition
- Author: Eugène Sue
- Original title: Le Juif errant
- Language: French
- Publication date: 1844
- Publication place: France
- Media type: Print

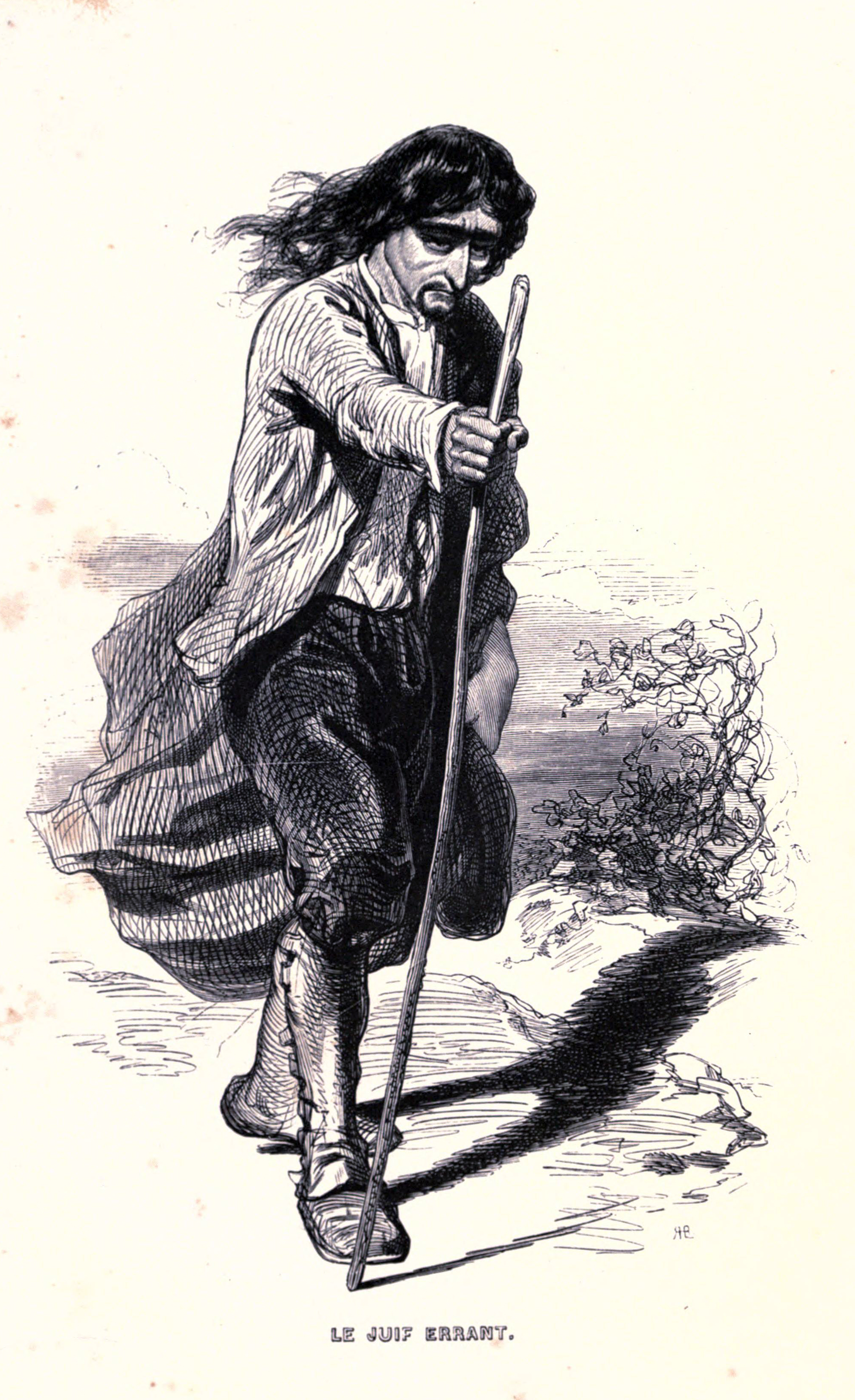
Le Juif errant

The Wandering Jew (French: Le Juif errant) is an 1844 novel by the French writer Eugène Sue. It tells the story of the descendants of a persecuted Huguenot whose fortune had been entrusted to a Jewish banker for 150 years. Scattered across the globe, they have inherited medals instructing them to reunite in Paris on 13 February 1832 to claim the fortune. While the Jesuit Order manipulates events and places obstacles in their paths, they are protected by the Wandering Jew and his sister, who are cursed to ensure the family's survival.

Combining adventure, mystery and social criticism, The Wandering Jew was one of the greatest literary successes of France at the time and helped establish the popularity of the feuilleton genre. Sue's second serial novel after The Mysteries of Paris, it was originally published from June 1844 to August 1845 in Le Constitutionnel and subsequently released in volumes. The left-leaning newspaper greatly benefited from the novel's instant success, with a readership rising from 3,600 to 23,600.

== Plot ==
Two figures cry out to each other across the Bering Straits. One is the Wandering Jew, the other his sister, Hérodiade. Wherever the Wandering Jew goes, the cholera epidemic follows in his wake.

The siblings are condemned to wander the Earth until the entire Rennepont family has disappeared from the Earth, as Hérodiade's descendants are also the descendants of Marius de Rennepont, Huguenots persecuted under Louis XIV by the Jesuits. The siblings are compelled to eternally protect that family.

The Renneponts, meanwhile, are unaware that their protectors exist.

The family lost its position and most of its wealth during the French persecution of the Protestants (after the revocation of the Edict of Nantes in 1685). A small fortune was given to a Jewish banker before the Renneponts dispersed all over Europe and Asia, and this fortune has grown into a huge sum, because of compound interest. In 1682, each Rennepont got a bronze medal telling them to meet back in Paris 150 years later, at which time the fortune will be divided among the surviving members. So much time has passed, however, that almost none of the still-living Renneponts have any idea why they need to come to Paris. They nevertheless set out from India, Siberia, America, France, and elsewhere to make their way to rue Saint-François No. 3 in Paris by 13 February 1832.

The members of the family are not only dispersed all over the world, but also all over the social ladder, as laborers, factory owners and the independently wealthy. In India, one Rennepont is a prince.

The Jesuits have heard of this huge fortune and want to have it. Jesuit Père d'Aigrigny is in charge of obtaining the money for the Society of Jesus and dispossessing the Renneponts. Their plan is to have only the unwitting Gabriel Rennepont, the Jesuit missionary, show up to claim the fortune. Since he is a monk and can have no possessions of his own, the fortune will go to the Jesuits. Gabriel entered the order because his pious mother, manipulated by the Jesuits, persuaded him to become a member.

The Jesuits have spies all over the world and use them to put obstacles in the paths of the Renneponts as they make their way back to Paris.

The principal obstacles are as follows:

- Dagobert, friend of the Rennepont family and guardian of the orphans Rose and Blanche has his papers and medal stolen by Morok, an animal tamer and accomplice of the Jesuits. Dagobert's horse, Jovial, is eventually killed by Morok's panther. Forced to travel on foot without papers, he is arrested for vagrancy and later freed by Hérodiade. He is then lured to a false meeting with a notary pretending to have messages from Général Simon.
- Rose and Blanche, twins coming from Siberia. Because of being under Dagobert's protection, they are also arrested and put in jail for vagrancy. Also, they are put in a convent by Dagobert's wife while Dagobert is at the notary meeting. She is made to swear by the Jesuits that she will not tell Dagobert where they are.
- Général Simon, father of Rose and Blanche, has been exiled from France and his family for so long that he does not even know he has daughters. He thinks he has one son. He does not arrive for the meeting, either.
- Djalma, Indian prince Rennepont, comes from the Far East. In Java, Djalma is accused of belonging to the "Étrangleurs", a murderous sect. A Jesuit henchmen tattoos Djalma with the Étrangleur tattoo on the inside of his arm while he is asleep. Djalma tries to prove that he is not an Étrangleur, but because of the tattoo is thrown in jail. This causes him to miss the boat to Paris. Later arriving in Paris, he is poisoned by Farighea (whom he had thought was his friend) and goes into a prolonged sleep. The Jesuits then kidnap him.
- Jacques Rennepont, a Parisian workman, was given papers by his father that explain his fortune but does not know how to read or write. The Jesuits send a money lender to him; when he cannot repay the loan, he is thrown into debtors' prison.
- François Hardy, progressive factory owner in Paris, is betrayed by his best friend who, under the influence of d'Aigrigny, lures Hardy to central France, ensuring that he will not arrive on 13 February.
- Adrienne de Cardoville, who is Parisian and independently wealthy, lives with her aunt, a former mistress of d'Aigrigny. The aunt, d'Aigrigny, and Jesuit doctor Baleinier connive to put Adrienne in an insane asylum that is next to the convent where Rose and Blanche are trapped.

Only Gabriel shows up to the meeting, but at the last minute Hérodiade makes an appearance. She goes to a drawer and pulls out a codicil that explains that the parties have three and a half months from 13 February to present themselves. Upon this turn of events, d'Aigrigny is fired, and Jesuit Rodin replaces him. He decides to use cholera to annihilate some of the Renneponts. He maneuvers Rose, Blanche, and Jacques in front of the cholera epidemic and rids himself of them.

With François Hardy, Rodin shows him how Hardy's best friend has betrayed him. He also arranges for Hardy's mistress to leave for the Americas, and has Hardy's factory burn to the ground (all this on the same day). Hardy takes refuge among the Jesuits, who persuade him to enter their order.

Knowing that Djalma is in love with Adrienne, the Jesuits make him think that she has been unfaithful, and he poisons himself. While Djalma dies slowly, Adrienne finds out what he has done and poison herself with his bottle, too.

On the day of the second meeting, none of the Renneponts show up (Gabriel having quit the Jesuits), and Rodin alone presents himself. But Samuel, the guardian of the house, realizes the injustices that have taken place. He brings the coffins of all the Renneponts back to show Rodin his wickedness and burns the testament that would have given Rodin access to the money.

Gabriel and Hardy die as a matter of course, which means that the Wandering Jew and Hérodiade can finally rest in peace. Together, they joyfully encounter their final "death".

== Publication ==
The Wandering Jew was a serially published novel which attained great popularity in Paris and beyond. According to historian John McGreevy, the novel was intensely and deliberately "anti-Catholic". Its publication, and that of its predecessor The Mysteries of Paris, greatly increased the circulation of the magazines in which they were published; in addition, they are held to have influenced legislation on the Jesuits, and caused a general "jesuitophobie". Antonio Bresciani's L'Ebreo di Verona (The Jew of Verona, 1850) was intended as an answer to Sue's The Wandering Jew. The novel is over 1,400 pages long. An opera, Le Juif errant, by Fromental Halévy, was based on elements of the novel.
