= City mysteries =

19th-century genre of popular novel

City mysteries are a 19th-century genre of popular novel, in which characters explore the secret underworlds of cities and uncover corruption and exploitation.

The "mysteries" originated with the wildly successful serial novel The Mysteries of Paris (1842) by Eugène Sue, which had many imitators and lent the genre its name. The novels were usually first serialized in newspapers, and were (like their less-respectable contemporaries the penny dreadfuls) controversial for their frank depiction of violence and sexual deviancy. They were broadly popular in both Europe and the United States, where The Quaker City (1844) held the title of fiction bestseller until unseated by Uncle Tom's Cabin.

== Examples ==
Prominent examples include:

- Les Vrais Mystères de Paris (1844) by Eugène François Vidocq
- Los misterios de Barcelona (1844) by Josep Nicasi Milà de la Roca
- Los misterios de Madrid: miscelánea de costumbres buenas y malas con viñetas y láminas á pedir de boca (1844) by Juan Martínez Villergas
- The Quaker City, or The Monks of Monk Hall (1845) by George Lippard
- Los Misterios del Plata (1846) by Juana Manso
- Venus in Boston (1849) by George Thompson
- City Crimes (1849) by George Thompson
- Life and Adventures of Jack Engle (1852) by Walt Whitman
- The Mysteries of Lisbon (1854) by Camilo Castelo Branco
- The Slums of Petersburg (1866) by Vsevolod Krestovsky
- Les Mystères de Marseille (1867) by Émile Zola
- The Mysteries of London (1844) by George W. M. Reynolds
- Les Mystères de Londres by Paul Féval
- Les Mystères de Lyon (featuring the Nyctalope) by Jean de La Hire
- I misteri di Napoli by Francesco Mastriani,
- Les Nouveaux Mystères de Paris by Léo Malet,
- Die Mysterien von Berlin by August Brass,
- Die Geheimnisse von Hamburg by Johann Wilhelm Christern,
- De Verborgenheden van Amsterdam by L. van Eikenhorst
