= The Mysteries of London =

1844 novel by George W. M. Reynolds

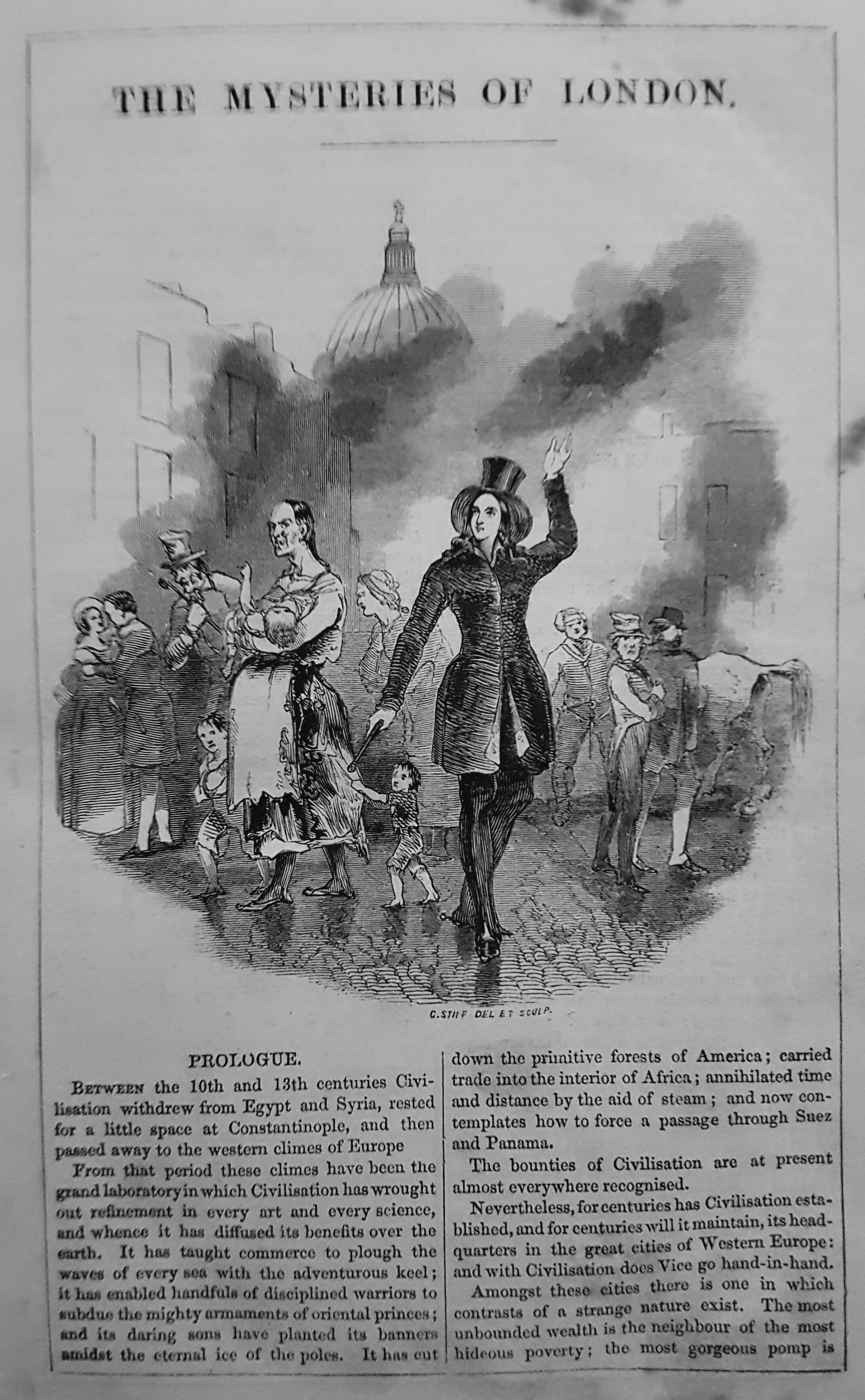
Title Page to the First Edition of The Mysteries of London

The Mysteries of London is a "penny blood" or city mysteries novel begun by George W. M. Reynolds in 1844. Recent scholarship has uncovered that it "was almost certainly the most widely read single work of fiction in mid-nineteenth century Britain, and attracted more readers than did the novels of Dickens, Bulwer-Lytton or Trollope." There are many plots in the story, but the overarching purpose is to reveal different facets of life in London, from its seedy underbelly to its over-indulgent and corrupt aristocrats. Reynolds wrote the first two series of this long-running narrative. Thomas Miller wrote the third series and Edward L. Blanchard wrote the fourth series of this immensely popular title.

The original text was published serially in 52 weekly parts. Installments were published weekly and contained a single illustration and eight pages of text printed in double columns. Upon its conclusion in 1845 all the parts were bound together in volume form and sold as a book by George Vickers of London.

Michael Anglo in Penny Dreadfuls and Other Victorian Horrors writes:

Reynolds had read Eugène Sue while in Paris, and he was impressed by his novel Les Mystères de Paris (The Mysteries of Paris). It inspired Reynolds to write and publish the penny part serial The Mysteries of London (1845), in which he paralleled Sue's tale of vice, depravity, and squalor in the Parisian slums with a sociological story contrasting the vice and degradation of London working-class life with the luxury and debaucheries of the hedonistic upper crust. An early socialist and a Chartist sympathizer, Reynolds had a genuine social conscience, and he contrived to stitch into the pages of his books diatribes against social evils and class inequities.

Later Victorian editions of The Mysteries of London carried the subtitle: Stories of Life in the Modern Babylon.

After Reynolds quit The Mysteries of London, he began a new title: The Mysteries of the Court of London, which ran from 1848 until 1856. Reynolds considered The Mysteries of London and The Mysteries of the Court of London to be one continuous work.

== Plot ==
The closest the stories have to a hero is the character Richard Markham, and the most villainous of the cast of villains is the Resurrection Man, a serial killer.
