= Eliza O'Flaherty =

Australian writer and stage actress

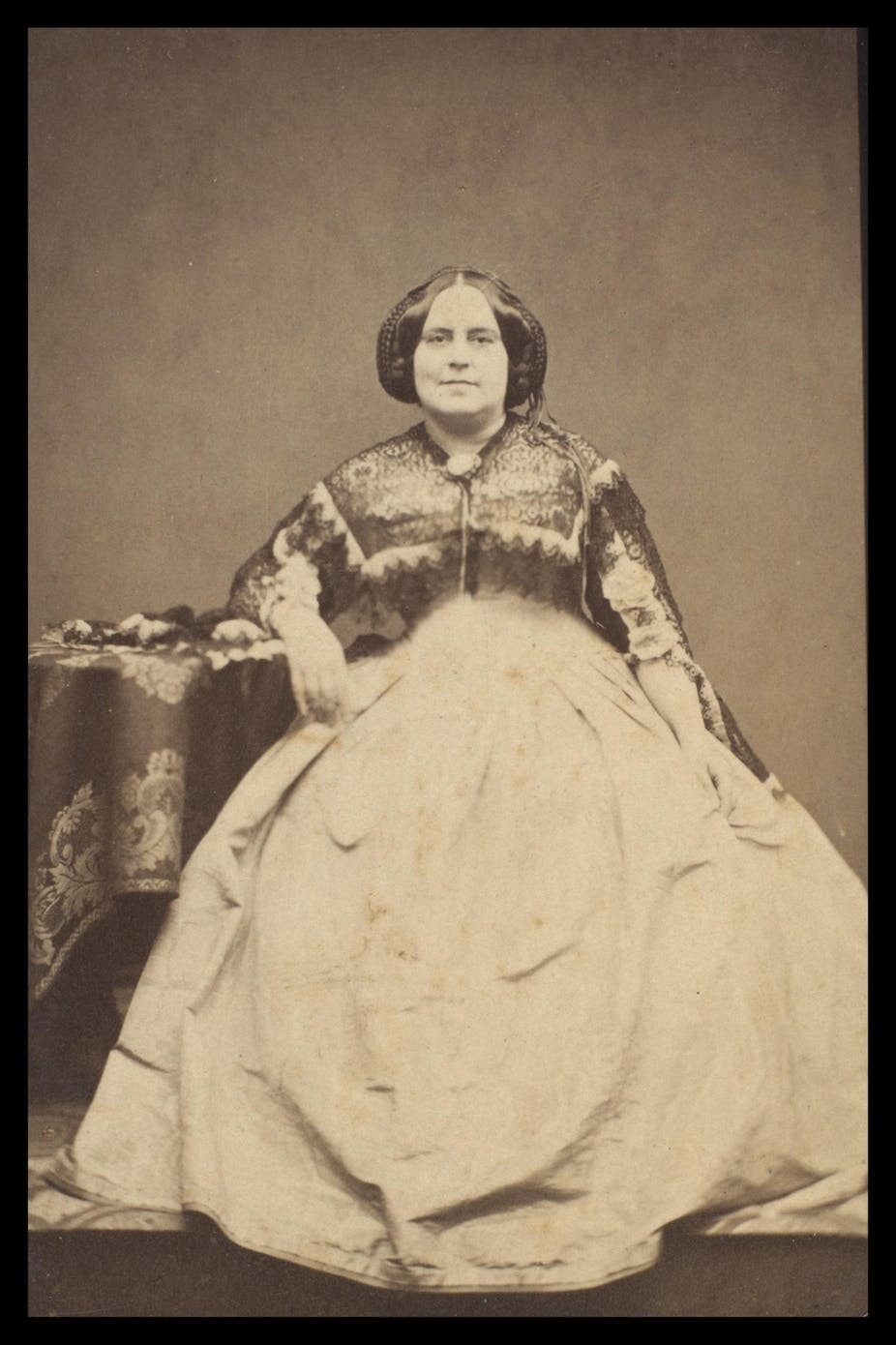
- c. 1860
- Born: Eliza Winstanley; 1 September 1818; Blackburn, Lancashire, England
- Died: 2 December 1882 (aged 64); Sydney, Australia
- Occupations: stage actress and writer

Eliza O'Flaherty (née Winstanley; 1 September 1818 – 2 December 1882) was an Australian writer and stage actress.

O'Flaherty was born on 1 September 1818 in Blackburn, Lancashire, England, daughter of William Winstanley and Eliza Finch, and emigrated to Australia with her family in 1833. She debuted at the Theatre Royal, Sydney, on 31 October 1834: this was the first theatre in Australia, newly opened, and she would thereby have belonged to the very first women active as professional actors in Australia. Her father was a decorator at the theatre, and her sister Ann was engaged as singer and dancer.

She married a theatre colleague, the actor Henry Charles O'Flaherty (d. 1854), in 1841. She managed the Olympic Theatre in Sydney with her spouse in 1842, where she caused a scandal by playing Richard III; at the time, women playing men's roles was not common in Australia, where theatre in itself had only recently been introduced.

O'Flaherty left Australia for England in 1846, where she enjoyed a successful acting career, performing privately for Queen Victoria on several occasions. She also toured the United States. She has been referred to as the first Australian actor to have an international career. She joined Charles Kean's London company in 1850.

Towards the end of her acting career, O'Flaherty started a new career as a writer, and by 1864 she had given up the stage entirely. She returned to Australia around 1880 and died in Sydney.

== Works ==
- Lucy Cooper, anonymous, 1854
- Shifting Scenes in Theatrical Life, 1859
- Bitter-Sweet—So Is the World, as by Ariele, 1860
- Margaret Falconer, 1860
- Twenty Straws, London, 1864

Books as Mrs Eliza Winstanley:

- The Mistress of Hawk's Crag, 1864
- Voices From the Lumber Room, 1865
- The Humming Bird, 1865–66
- Desmond, or the Red Hand, 1866
- The Cockletop, 1866
- Carynthia, a Legend of Black Rock, 1866–67
- What Is To Be Will Be, London, 1867
- Who Did It?, 1867
- The Queen of Clitherly, 1867
- Astrutha, an Irish Story, 1867
- Entrances and Exits, 1868
- For Her Natural Life: A Tale of 1830, 1876
- Imogen Hubert, 1876

Magazines edited:

- Bow Bells: A Weekly Magazine of General Literature and Art, published by John Dicks
- Fiction for Family Reading, published by John Dicks
