= City Crimes =

1849 American novel

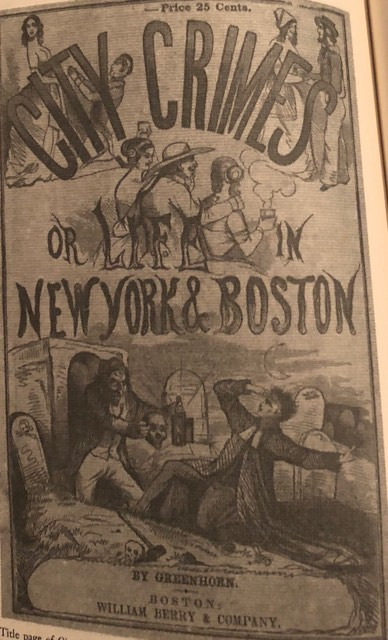
- Cover of City Crimes, first published in 1849
- Author: George Thompson
- Language: English
- Genre: Urban Mysteries/ Gothic
- Publication date: September 1st, 1849
- Publication place: United States

City Crimes; Or, Life in New York and Boston is an 1849 novel by George Thompson, writing under the penname of "Greenhorn". The novel was written for the working class and meant to give a shock to its readers through its use of graphic violence among several characters and sexual promiscuity, specifically among women. It is considered by critics to fall within several genres such as sensational literature and urban gothic and to have laid the groundwork for the city mysteries genre.

== Background ==
Sensational urban stories such as City Crimes were extremely popular in the 1840s and 1850s, which is around when slave narratives gained traction in the public sphere. Some parts of City Crimes borrow from these slave narratives, such as Narrative of The Life of Henry Box Brown. Another contemporary genre was the domestic novel, a sort of antithesis to the more sensational novels such as City Crimes. Where domestic novels avoided topics such as the body and sexuality altogether, sensational novels strove to deliver both in a way as gripping as possible to the audience. They tended to be concerned with greed and virtue, often intertwined with sexuality (a trend which City Crimes follows), where men and women alike are cautioned to avoid or repress their sexual impulses. Sensationalist books like City Crimes tended to be considered as lesser than other types of literature, and as such sold as cheap books for travelers. They were written to appeal to a masculine audience, specifically those in cities, and books like City Crimes are seen as a reaction both to domestic novels and to the rise of urban life.

== Characters and plot ==
Though the narrator generally follows the protagonist Frank Sydney, it bounces around between characters. It tends to show the city in very close-up and claustrophobic ways, as opposed to broadly, and favors individual experience over crowd experiences. The reader follows the narrator as they reveal to the reader the dark underbelly of life in the city. It features several characters at odds with one another, chief among them being Frank Sydney and The Dead Man.

=== Main characters ===
==== Frank Sydney ====
Frank Sydney is the protagonist of the story. He is engaged to Julia Fairfield, and has an affair with Maria Archer during this time. Some of his exploits include thwarting robbers intending to steal from him and helping to rehabilitate other characters and turn them away from crime. Early on, he's a rich man who abandons his life to help people, but is quickly whisked into the crime-ridden city and finds himself the victim of extreme violence. In the course of this he stumbles into several perilous situations, including facing imprisonment and torture by The Dead Man. He's often reliant on others to help him understand this world he enters, and uses guides on his journeys into, and escape out of, The Dark Vaults.

==== The Dead Man ====
The main antagonist in City Crimes is The Dead Man. The Dead Man is a character who, in order to conceal his identity, horribly disfigured and scarred his face through chemical means. Throughout the book, he commits several violent crimes, including blinding Josephine Franklin with sulfuric acid. He held several positions in the past, including that of a physician and temperance supporter, and reveled in immorality in these roles until he eventually turned to remorseless murder and crime.

When the book takes place, he lives in the underground "Dark Vaults", characterized by violence, cannibalism, sexual taboos such as incest, and decaying animals and human corpses. His familial ties begin when he murder's a woman's husband, blinds and murders her two children, and has two children by her. One is called "The Image", and is a ghoulish subhuman creature that lives hidden away. The other is a criminal child taught to disregard morality and seek success in criminal acts. Some of his other wicked deeds in the book include torture, rape, mutilation, and arson. At the end of the story, he, after undergoing torture himself, is blown up and thus killed.

==== Maria Archer ====
Maria Archer is a prostitute who witnessed her parents cheat on each other as a child. This marked the beginning of her slip into social and moral decay, which culminates in her husband, Fred, forcing her into prostitution. Due to her upbringing and oppressive husband, her prostitution is partially apologized for by the narrator, though she still ends up dead (like the other women in the novel) at the hands of her husband when she refuses to keep paying him the money she earns. Later on, Fred becomes trapped in a vault and suffocates within, meeting his end.

==== Julia Fairfield ====
Julia Fairfield, while in a relationship with Frank Sydney, resists Frank physically, and has an affair with the African-American servant Nero. Frank is furious with her for cheating on him and separates from her, an act which Julia celebrates as it gives her newfound freedom to pursue her desires. As a result of this affair, Julia becomes pregnant. She kills the child of the affair with Nero soon after giving birth to it, then moves on from her relationship with Frank Sydney to a man named Mr. Hedge. Julia marries Mr. Hedge for his money, which facilitates her lifestyle, until eventually she kills him and then herself.

==== Sophia Franklin ====
The only non-sexually aggressive woman in the novel is Sophia Franklin. She is fully non-sexual, rebuffing advances made on her, until she unites with Frank Sydney at the end of the book. She is upheld by the narrator as a pillar of good, and is meant as the example to be followed for women. Beyond this, she plays an insignificant role in the story. Her sister Josephine and mother Lucretia, however, are both incredibly deviant sexually and morally, and greatly overshadow her in the book. Lucretia connives with Josephine to have her husband, Edgar Franklin, killed, so she may pursue her desires with pride, and encourages her daughters to do the same. After being blinded and facially disfigured by The Dead Man, Josephine marries a man named Thurston, and, upon the revelation that her face is now horrifically scarred, both parties kill themselves.

== Genre ==
City Crimes belongs to a number of different genres, one of which being sensationalist literature. As a member of the sensationalists, City Crimes emphasizes decadence in city life. The genre tended to highlight the downsides of the urban world, and uphold the idea of the simple rural life. Part of this emphasis on urban ills involves showing what they dub the "real" world, as opposed to what readers would want to see the real world as. Though they made use of violence and sex as shocking devices, they did so as a cautionary tale against sex and violence. Sexuality is seen as a vice as well as a tool, used by characters for financial gain and security, and is punished accordingly. This is seen in City Crimes specifically when the sexually active women, such as Maria Archer, die at the end of their arcs.

City Crimes is also considered an urban gothic book, exhibiting a penchant for grotesque and deformed characters and horror elements, and considered to have lain the foundation for the City-Mysteries genre that Thompson and later writers wrote in. Thompson draws on the Gothic with his use of underground passages and hideouts, supernatural-seeming entities, and disfigured servants of evil such as The Dead Man and his hidden dwarf-like child "The Image". This is further exemplified with the use of scenes of graphic violence.

== Reception ==
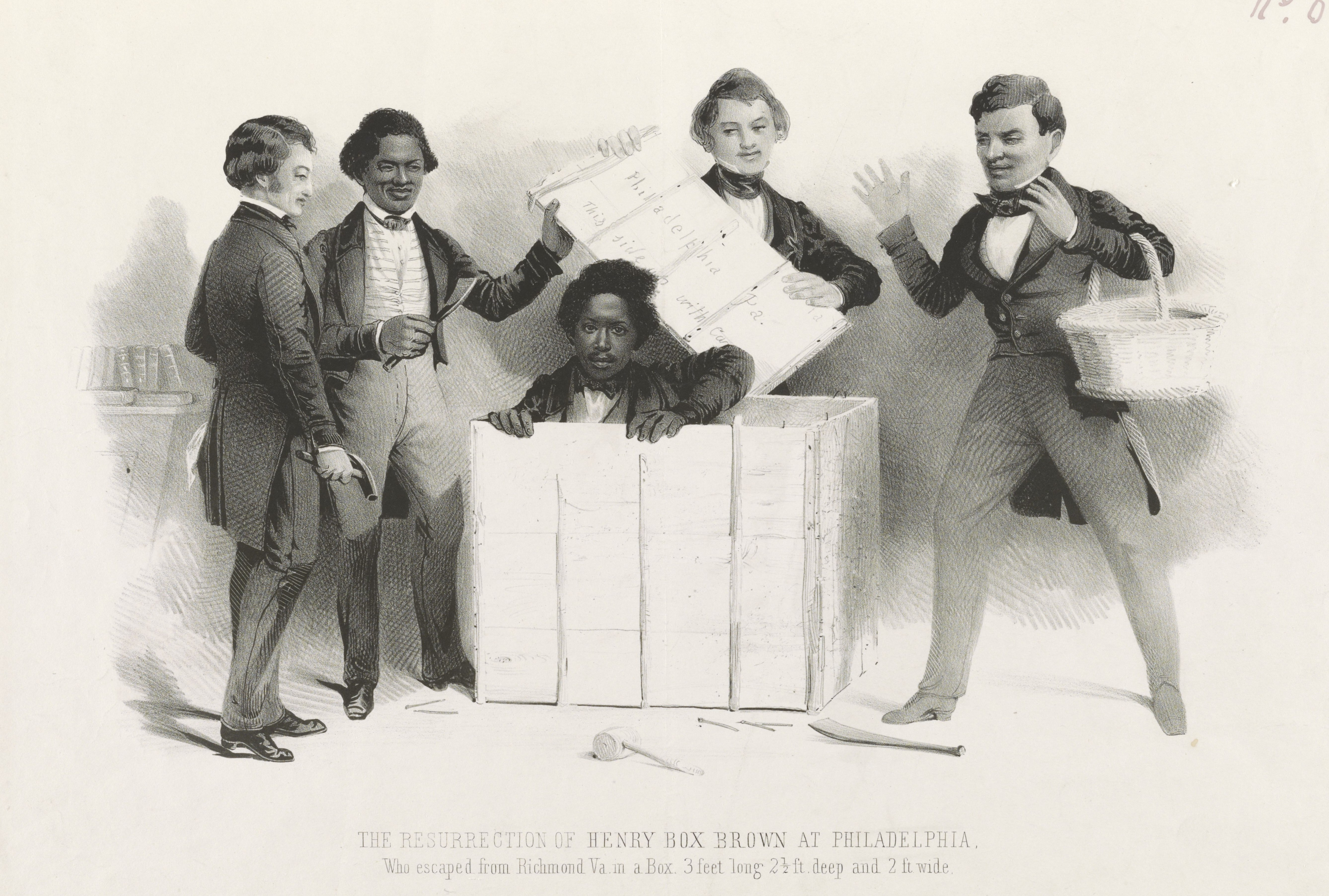
City Crimes draws from the life of Henry Box Brown.

The reception of City Crimes at the time of publication was fairly negative, and remained as such for much of its existence. Overall, for contemporary readers and for critics reading when it was first published, City Crimes has a mixed reception.

One criticism by Carl Ostrowski of City Crimes is that Thompson profits off of slave narratives, such as that of Henry Box Brown.

In Henry Box Brown's narrative, he escapes slavery by physically mailing himself away in a package. He prepared a few supplies for his journey, but was met with a new trouble when the box he encased himself in was stored upside-down for transit. As a result, Henry wrote of painful complications involving the blood rushing to his head.

Drawing from this, in City Crimes, the antagonist, The Dead Man, does the same thing, mailing himself out of Sing Sing prison and encountering the torment of being stored upside-down. Thompson makes a few changes to Henry Box Brown's story as he details a grotesque flow of blood from The Dead Man, while also sizing up the dimensions of the box as compared to Henry Box Brown's. The connection between The Dead Man's fictional trouble and Henry Box Brown's factual experience is further strengthened by the fact that City Crimes was published soon after Narrative of the Life of Henry Box Brown, which suggests the prison escape of Thompson's was adapted from Henry Box Brown's work.

Another criticism by Zaren White is that City Crimes is pornographic in its extreme interpretation of the Gothic genre and treats male and female sexuality differently. Where both are criticized, sexual women in the novel are killed and meet terrible fates, where sexual men are apologized for. Further, male sexuality isn't connected as closely to crimes such as murder as female sexuality is.

Scholars such as David S. Reynolds, however, assert that, though City Crimes and sensational novels like City Crimes have been shunned by critics, they have a place in the greater context of literature. Sensational literature like City Crimes was cheaper than the other side of the literary coin of the time, domestic novels, and had an incredibly wide readership, making City Crimes, as a popular sensational novel, an important part of literary history. Further, City Crimes subverted the status quo in terms ideas of institutions and power, as well as prevalent ideas of righteousness, and helped open up the idea that literature didn't have to have a distinct moral compass.

== Analysis ==
Throughout City Crimes, the sexuality of women is something to be repressed and fought against. Any deviation from the sexual norm for women is punished in the story. Female sexuality and crime are linked together, creating an association in the narrative between sex and immorality. It seeks to be a cautionary tale about rampant sexuality, and swings from explicit violence to heavily implicit sexual encounters. It seeks also to show the failings of the city's moral fiber and use exciting material to grab a reader's attention. To keep this interest, it employs use of titillating images and couples it with shocking revelations.

City Crimes also has several social concerns, such as a concern for the danger of being a prostitute and the reluctant life of prostitution in the city, as illustrated by Maria Archer, and some concerns for working class struggles. It's also very concerned with class structure. Thompson portrays the rich as enemies of the middle class, and while the protagonist is a rich man, he's associated with the "lower" classes, and is abandoned by his upper echelons (who he also doesn't hesitate to criticize). Thompson also illustrates how the rich are held less accountable than other people when, in one scene, a police officer pardons Frank when he finds out who he is, disgusting frank. A judge pardons another character, Dr. Sinclair, in a similar fashion, and is also depicted stealing money through the corrupt legal system. It then continues with social commentary to bemoan how prisoners are treated excessively poorly. Religious systems are also up for scrutiny, as Thompson showcases drunken temperance speakers and other hypocrisies of priests and reverends.

City Crimes, as a city-mysteries novel, appealed mainly to the working class, and used an underlying upset with the upper class as a means to be relatable for the working class readership. Upper-class people being immoral and wicked in the book tended to be the result of such a design, and the book portrayed itself as shining a light on something unspoken in society.

For example, after The Dead Man mails himself out of Sing Sing Prison, he arrives at a warehouse, where, from within the box, he overhears the owner boast about taking advantage of prison labor to pay lower wages. He also overhears the same man say his insurance will no longer be covering the warehouse. He burns down the warehouse in the name of the working class, making the scene a sort of sympathetic scene for The Dead Man to Thompson's readership (middle class workers). In this way, Thompson utilizes and warps what was effective about Henry Box Brown's narrative to appeal to a different audience, including language such as "master" to keep a similar emotional attachment.

== Publication ==
City Crimes was published in the newspaper Sporting Chronicle on September 1, 1849, under the pseudonym "Greenhorn." It was then published again in two parts, with the first part being published in June 1850 in Police Gazette. City Crimes was also included in a book list in The Miscellany in 1857, though Thompson himself was never explicitly mentioned.
