= Hawaii Holomua =

American newspaper founded in 1891

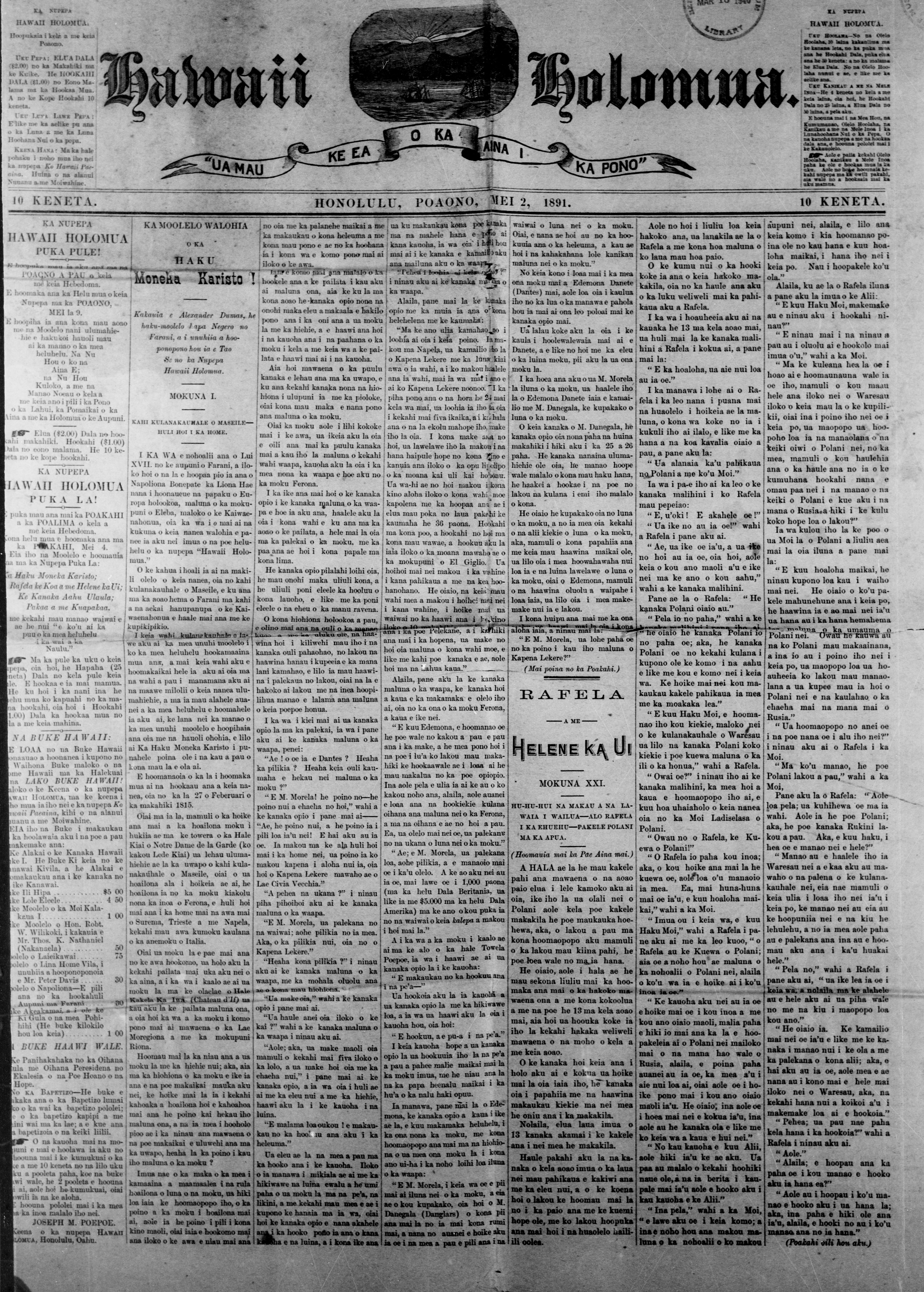
- May 2, 1891, front page
- Type: Daily and weekly
- Founder: Joseph Mokuʻōhai Poepoe
- Founded: May 2, 1891
- Ceased publication: January 5, 1895
- Language: Hawaiian; English
- City: Honolulu
- Country: United States
- ISSN: 2163-4653
- OCLC number: 11847419

The Hawaii Holomua ('Hawaiian Progress' or 'Improving Hawaii') was a Hawaiian daily and weekly newspaper published in both Hawaiian and English. It was founded in 1891 with four editions: two versions were published in solely Hawaiian daily and weekly; and another two were published in both Hawaiian and English, also daily and weekly. The bilingual versions were replaced by an English-only version in 1893, following the newspaper's purchase by the Holomua Publishing Company. The newspaper was a vocal supporter of the Hawaiian Kingdom, and actively opposed the Provisional Government of Hawaii following the kingdom's 1893 overthrow. It was the only newspaper in Hawaii to publish Queen Liliʻuokalani's protest against the overthrow and her appeal to U.S. President Grover Cleveland. The Hawaii Holomua and its various editions suddenly ceased publication in 1895.

== History ==
The Hawaii Holomua was founded on May 2, 1891, by Joseph Mokuʻōhai Poepoe. Its name can be translated in English to "go-ahead Hawaii". Poepoe served as its inaugural editor. The newspaper began with four editions: daily and weekly Hawaiian-language versions and daily and weekly English-language versions. In the editorial of the first issue of the Hawaii Holomua, they said that it did not hold any affiliation with the two major parties—the Liberal Party and the National Reform Party—and hoped that the newspaper brought unity and ended disagreements amongst Native Hawaiians. Poepoe seemed to have resigned as the Hawaii Holomua's editor in February 1892, returning to law. He was succeeded as editor by Kahikina Kelekona; by 1893, G. Carson Kenyon had become a co-editor of the paper. During the 1892 elections for both chambers of the legislature of the Hawaiian Kingdom, the Hawaii Holomua did not stand for a specific party, but rather any party supporting Native Hawaiians. In 1893, the newspaper was purchased by the Holomua Publishing Company. With its purchase, an English-only edition of the newspaper titled the Hawaii Progress Holomua replaced the bilingual version. Its first issue was published on September 18, 1893. The newspaper was published every afternoon with the exception of Sundays and holidays. Its motto was "The Life of the Land is Established in Righteousness." In 1893, the total circualation of the Hawaii Holomua and all its versions was estimated to be around 5,000.

On January 5, 1895, the Progress Holomua abruptly ceased publication. In their final issue, the paper stated that they did not believe that there was "the slightest reason for fear of uprisings." The following day, the 3-day Wilcox rebellion, which attempted to restore the monarchy in Hawaii, broke out. Throughout the 1890s, opposition papers, including the Hawaii Holomua, accounted for nearly 85% of readers in Hawaii.

== Political positions ==
The Hawaii Holomua was a vocal supporter of the Hawaiian Kingdom. The Progress Holomua opposed the Provisional Government of Hawaii and was the sole newspaper in Hawaii to publish Queen Liliʻuokalani's protest against the overthrow and her appeal to Grover Cleveland, the then-president of the United States. Norrie called the provisional government "bogus" and "fraudulent", saying that most people in Hawaii disavowed the provisional government; in the December 21, 1893, issue of the Progress Holomua, he stated: "For the provisional government to pretend to represent the Hawaiian people is an outrageous absurdity, induced by their fear of taking a vote of the people, knowing that it would overthrow them." From 1893 to 1895, the provisional government created laws to discourage newspapers from "incident and seditious language" and "conspiracy", in fear of newspapers opposing the government sparking a counterrevolution. As a result, Norrie was arrested five times and made to pay a $100 fine three separate times.

On June 27, 1893, Waimea deputy sheriff Louis Stolz was murdered by Kaluaikoʻolau "Koʻolau" in the Kalalau Valley, who had fled there in order to escape forceful relocation to Molokaʻi. A manhunt for Koʻolau took place soon after, but was ultimately unsuccessful and left three soldiers dead, with Koʻolau becoming a folk hero to Native Hawaiians. Although the pro-monarchist papers in Hawaii favored Koʻolau, the Hawaii Holomua and their sister publication, the Daily Bulletin, called for "justice at any cost" for Stolz, siding with the annexationist papers. The Hawaii Holomua also blamed William Owen Smith, attorney general of the provisional government, for prematurely starting the manhunt and ending it without having captured Ko‘olau. In the lead up to the upcoming constitutional convention in 1894, the Hawaiian Holomua frequently ran attacks against it. In the article "By the People", its editors demanded "the return to the constitutional government approved and supported by the people, previous to [U.S. Minister to Hawaii John Leavitt Stevens'] coup d'état," and stated that they would continue to advocate for a government "by the people of the people and for the people."

The Hawaii Holomua was also very critical of the use of spies during the provisional government and into the Republic of Hawaii, established in 1894, to monitor their opposition. The paper's editorial described the use of spies as "an act which is both unnecessary and expensive," and that "many of the men thus clothed with authority, or supposed to be, are not of good character, and their training and instincts make them an undesirable element for the peacefully disposed citizens of Honolulu to come in contact in the light or dark." In April 1894, the Hawaii Holomua identified spies stationed at Washington Place by name. The paper continued to criticize spies even in their final issue.

== See also ==
- List of newspapers in Hawaii
