= Vsevolod Krestovsky =

Russian writer

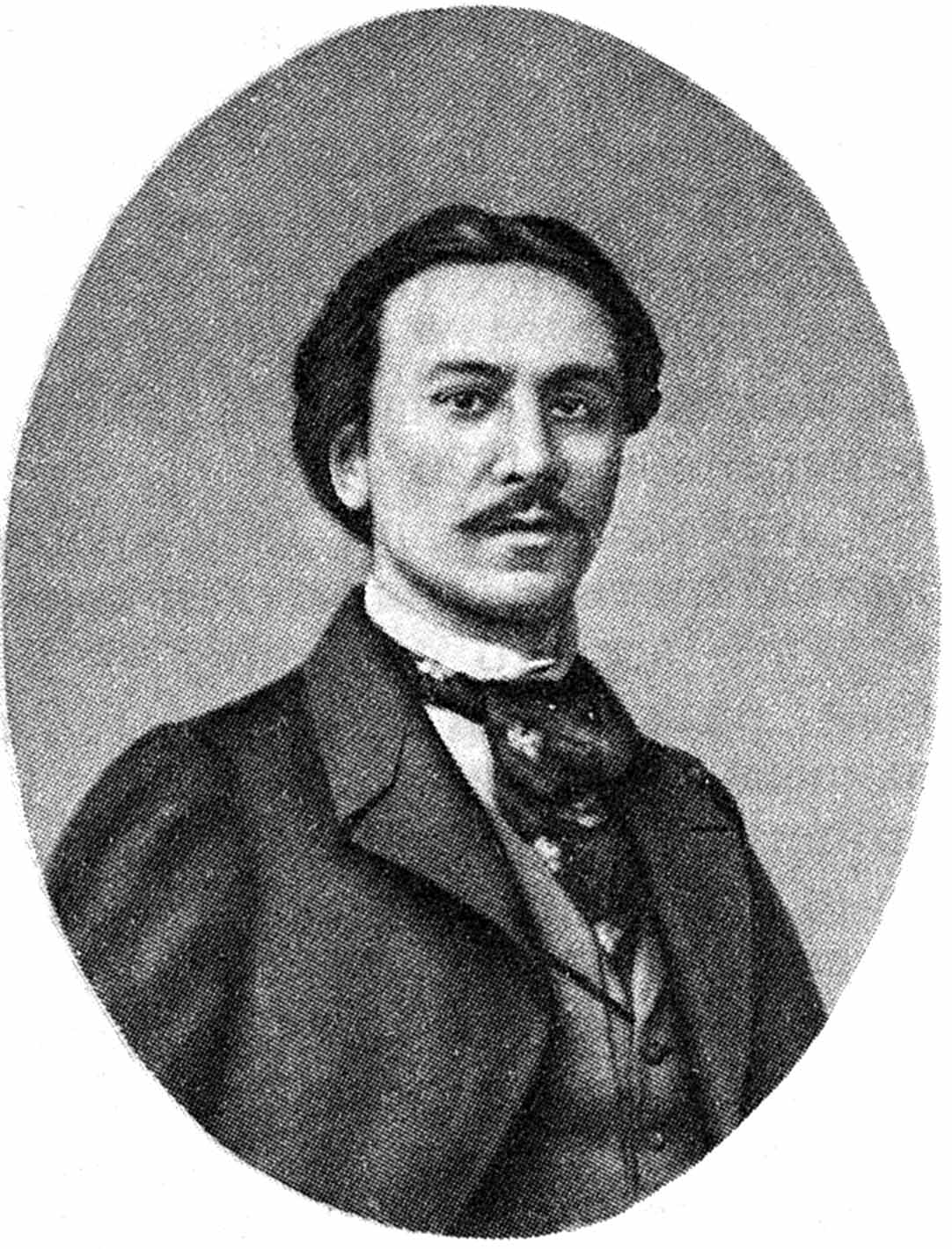
- Born: February 23, 1840; Kiev Governorate, Russian Empire
- Died: January 30, 1895 (aged 54); Warsaw, Poland

Vsevolod Vladimirovich Krestovsky (Russian: Все́волод Влади́мирович Кресто́вский; February 23, 1840 – January 30, 1895) was a Russian writer who worked in the city mysteries genre.

== Biography ==
Krestovsky came from an old family of Polish gentry (szlachta) with roots in nowadays Ukraine. In 1857 he enrolled in the Historico-Philological faculty of St Petersburg University. At the university he became friends with the radical critic Dmitry Pisarev, and wrote for the magazine Russian Word.

After his short association with the radical camp, he joined a group of moderate slavophiles which included Apollon Maykov, Lev Mei and others, and began publishing his works in Notes of the Fatherland, Time and Epoch. In 1860 he left the university to become a professional writer. His novel The Slums of Saint Petersburg (1864), a product of many hours of personal observation, gained him considerable popularity.

In 1863 he traveled to Warsaw to take notes for his novel The Flock of Panurge (1869), about the January Uprising. In 1874 he wrote another novel, The Force, on the same subject. Both novels were reactionary in nature. In the 1880s Krestovsky became frankly and openly antisemitic in his political and social views. His blatantly antisemitic trilogy The Jews are Coming was published between 1888 and 1892. He died in Warsaw in 1895.

== English translations ==
- Knights of Industry, from Mystery Tales, The Continental Classics, Volume 17, Harper and Brothers, NY and London, 1909. from Archive.org
