= John Dicks (publisher) =

English publisher (1818–1881)

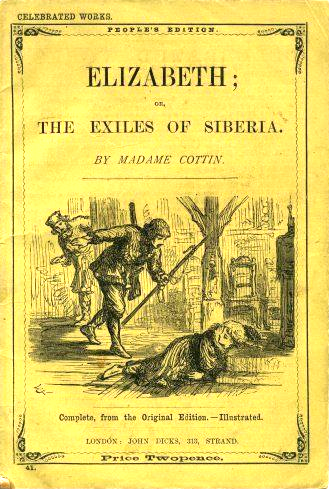
Cover of Cottin's Elizabeth or the Exiles of Siberia, published by John Dicks, Strand, London, circa 1880s.

John Thomas Dicks (1818–1881) was a publisher in London in the 19th century. He issued popular, affordably priced fiction and drama, such as "shilling Shakespeares and wonderfully cheap reprints of Scott and other standard authors." Earlier in his career he worked with Peter Perring Thoms and George W. M. Reynolds. Employees included illustrator Frederick Gilbert. Readers included Thomas Burt and Havelock Ellis. Dicks retired in the 1870s, when his sons took over the firm which continued into the 1960s.

== Works issued by John Dicks ==
- Musical Treasures (sheet music series); numbered list

=== Drama ===
- The British drama: illustrated, vol. 1–4, John Dicks, 1864–66
- Dicks' British Drama, 1866–, 1866 (series)

==== Dicks' Standard Plays ====
- Dicks' Standard Plays, 1874–1907 (series)
- List of Dicks' Standard Plays and Free Acting Drama, 1883, OL 7225611M – arranged by number, title, author (Ainsworth, Dickens, Lytton, Scott, etc.), and theme (nautical, dumb hero, ghost, Irish, Scotch, military, temperance, fairy, equestrian, etc.)
List of Dicks' Standard Plays

| Number | Title | Author | Image | Fulltext |
|---|---|---|---|---|
| 10 | Iron Chest | George Colman | Cover | |
| 14 | Honeymoon | John Tobin | | Internet Archive |
| 354 | Alice Gray, the suspected one | John T. Haines | | HathiTrust |
| 368 | Factory Assassin | | | |
| 388 | Bleak House | George Lander, adapted from Charles Dickens | | |
| 398 | Old Curiosity Shop | George Lander, adapted from Charles Dickens | | |
| 400 | Jane Eyre | | Cover | |
| 409 | Culprit; and, The boarding school | | | HathiTrust |
| 432 | The Fairy Circle; or, Con O’Carrolan’s Dream, in two acts | H. P. Grattan | | |
| 460 | Black Doctor | Ira Aldridge | | |
| 465 | St. Patrick's Day | Richard Brinsley Sheridan | | Internet Archive |
| 469 | Nicholas Nickleby | H. Simms, adapted from Charles Dickens | | |
| 485 | Yew tree ruins | John Thomas Haines | Cover | HathiTrust |
| 561 | Pic-Nic and The Railway Hotel | | | Google Books |
| 571 | Infant Phenomenon | H. Horncastle, adapted from Charles Dickens | | |
| 571 | Captain Cuttle | John Brougham | | |
| 626 | Jane, the Licensed Victualler's Daughter | J.P. Hart | | |
| 636 | Bardell & Pickwick | Adapted from Charles Dickens | | |
| 641 | Factory Boy | John Thomas Haines | | |
| 666 | Bringing Home the Bride | | | Google Books |
| 669 | Angeline | | | Google Books |
| 671 | Noyades | | | Google Books |
| 673 | Love, Law and Physic | | | Google Books |
| 790 | Factory Strike | G.F. Taylor | | |
| 809 | Lesson for Ladies | John Baldwin Buckstone | | HathiTrust |
| 898 | Court Beauties | James Planché | | |
| 930 | Factory Lad | John Walker | | |
| 1001 | Battle of Life | Adapted from Charles Dickens | | |
| 1004 | Nine too many | J.B. Buckstone | | HathiTrust |
| 1004 | Wigwam | Shirley Brooks | | HathiTrust |
| 1052 | No Thoroughfare | | | |

=== Fiction ===
- George W. M. Reynolds. Mysteries of the Court of London.
- Dicks' English Novels (series); numbered list
- Dicks' English Library of Standard Works (series).
  - Dicks' English Library of Standard Works, v.33 (via British Library on Flickr)
  - WorldCat. Dicks' English Library of Standard Works (series)
- Dicks' Celebrated Works (series); numbered list

=== Periodicals ===
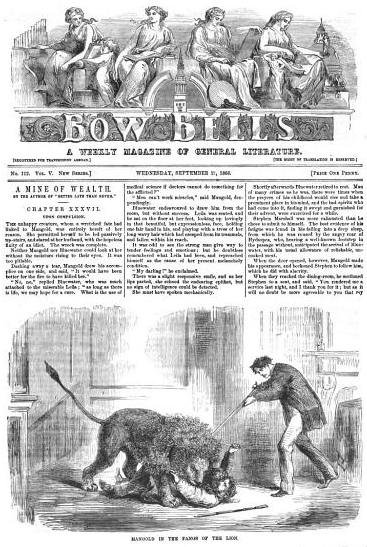
Bow Bells, 1866 (with illustration of "Mangold in the fangs of the lion")

- Bow Bells: A Weekly Magazine of General Literature and Art, 1862, pp. 83 v – authors included George Manville Fenn, George Augustus Sala
  - Fashion plate, 1865
  - Fashion plates, 1870s
- Reynolds' Miscellany
- Halfpenny Gazette, 1861–1865
- Every Week, 1869–1896
- Penny Illustrated Weekly News
- Fiction, edited by Eliza Winstanley – weekly

=== Catalogues ===
- Shakespeare, William (c. 1860s), List of Books Published by John Dicks
- John Dicks' Catalogue, 1874, OCLC 500243028
