= Honolulu Weekly =

Defunct newspaper in Honolulu, Hawaii

- Type: Alternative weekly
- Format: Tabloid
- Founder: Laurie V. Carlson
- Publisher: Laurie V. Carlson
- Editor: Mindy Pennybacker (2011–2013)
- Founded: July 17, 1991; 35 years ago
- Ceased publication: June 5, 2013; 13 years ago
- Language: English
- Headquarters: Honolulu, Hawaii, U.S.
- Circulation: 45,000 (as of 2005)
- Price: Free
- Sister newspapers: Hawaii Island Journal (2005–2008)
- ISSN: 1057-414X
- Free online archives: eVols

Honolulu Weekly was a free alternative weekly newspaper published in Honolulu, Hawaiʻi, from 1991 to 2013. Founded by Laurie V. Carlson, it combined investigative reporting, consumer features, arts and entertainment coverage, and political commentary. From 1999 to 2002 the paper was involved in a legal dispute with the city of Honolulu over a law banning free publications from coin-operated newsracks. The Weekly published its final issue on June 5, 2013, after its finances had become unsustainable.

== History ==
=== Founding and early years ===
Honolulu Weekly was founded by Laurie V. Carlson, who started the paper as both a business and an effort to uphold journalist ideals, writing that "a strictly bottom line approach undermines the value of the press to society." The first issue was published on July 17, 1991, with a cover story focused on evictions on Honolulu's Tusitala Street. The paper's founding editors were Julia Steele and Derek Farrar. They were replaced by Elizabeth Kieszkowski as sole editor by late 1997. The paper underwent a series of editorial changes in the early 2000s, cycling through at least four until Mindy Pennybacker retained the post from 2011 until the paper's closing in 2013.

In 1997, a local ordinance was passed that required publishers in Waikiki to use city-built newsracks rather than their own. The Honolulu Weekly was opposed to this, as the paper was forced to share space in free newsracks with tourist publications and coupon books rather than news-oriented publications. The paper eventually won space in dedicated coin-operated newsracks and planned to disable the coin mechanisms but were stopped by the city. In response, the paper sued the city and won a preliminary injunction, with U.S. District Judge Susan Oki Mollway stating that excluding free publications from the coin-operated racks was not narrowly tailored to the city's interests in safety and aesthetics. Mollway struck down the law entirely in 2001, but that decision was overturned by a three-judge Ninth Circuit panel the following year.

=== Hawaii Island Journal and competition ===
In 2005 the paper's owner purchased the Hawaii Island Journal, a free twice-monthly paper. That same year, the Honolulu Weekly was distributing 45,000 copies a week and had developed plans to expand to Maui and Kauai. Hawaii Island Journal was shut down in June 2008. In September of that year, one of the paper's journalists, Joan Conrow, was charged with trespassing after covering a protest against a house being built over 30 Hawaiian graves. The charges were dropped after the police determined that Conrow was "covered by the First Amendment."

A red Honolulu Weekly box (third from right) among newspaper vending machines in Honolulu, 2007

In 2010 the paper's primary competitors, The Honolulu Advertiser and the Honolulu Star-Bulletin, came under the same ownership and were merged. The new owner also shut down the Star-Bulletin's printing press, which had been used by the Honolulu Weekly as well, forcing them to move their printing from Kāneʻohe to Maui.

=== Closure ===
The paper announced its closure on June 5, 2013, with the final issue published that same day. Carlson, the paper's publisher, stated that the paper's finances had gone "from manageable with great stress to bleak" and that there were not enough new advertisers for the paper to sustain itself. Ikaika Hussey, publisher of the Hawaii Independent, called the closure a loss for the community. The paper's editor, Pennybacker, said that she was considering restarting the paper as a nonprofit alongside the Nation Institute and a group of former writers and editors launched a successor blog, "HI Spy," later that year.

== Archive ==
In 2017 the University of Hawaiʻi at Mānoa Library announced that they would host the paper's full run online in its eVols digital repository. The library said that the paper's embrace of "advocacy journalism" had drawn accusations of bias but that the paper consistently published letters critical of its own content.
