= Hawaii Island Journal =

Newspaper in Hawaii, United States

- Type: Three Saturdays a month
- Format: Recommended: Broadsheet, Tabloid, Digital-only
- Owner(s): Michael Gibson (1992-2001), Lane Wick and Karen Valentine (2001-2008)
- Publisher: Pacific Catalyst Publishing LLC
- Editor: Peter Serafin
- Founded: 1992-2008
- Ceased publication: June 14, 2008
- Language: English
- Headquarters: Hilo, Hawaii
- Circulation: 24,000
- Website: Home page does not exist anymore Last remaining article

The Hawaii Island Journal was a free newspaper founded in 1999 and published on the Big Island of Hawaii three Saturdays a month. Originally based in the Kona town of Captain Cook and later headquartered in Hilo, the Journal focused on political, environmental, and cultural news. The print paper shut in 2008 and as of 2014, the website has not been updated since 2011.

== History ==
The Hawaii Island Journal grew out of the Big Island news and opinion magazine Ka'u Landing, which had been publishing since 1992. Both publications were established and edited by Michael Gibson. Ka'u Landing was noted for its glossy covers featuring works by local artists (the inside pages were newsprint). After seeing a marked decline in Ka'u Landing's circulation over the past several years, Gibson decided to start an islandwide community newspaper. The content was eclectic, ranging from reprints of a contributor's grandmother's letters to lengthy articles on environmental issues. In 2001 Gibson sold the newspaper to Lane Wick and Karen Valentine, who shifted the Journal 's focus to local politics and environmental news.

From 2002 to 2005, Gretchen Currie Kelly served as editor, expanding the paper's focus to include comprehensive coverage of Native Hawaiian issues as well as investigative reporting of development issues on the island. HIJ's format allowed for in-depth exploration of topics that were only being superficially covered in the island's dailies, and the paper became a uniquely valuable source of information for island residents. Award-winning journalist Alan McNarie, who had begun writing for Ka'u Landing, continued with HIJ and was the paper's senior contributor.

Between 2001 and 2007, HIJ's circulation grew to 24,000, making it the widest-circulation paper on Hawaiʻi island. Honolulu Weekly acquired the Journal in the spring of 2005. Peter Serafin was named as HIJ's new editor.

An article in the June 11, 2008 issue of The Honolulu Advertiser reported that the Journal would close in June.

== Competition ==
In a letter published in the July 19, 2006 issue of Honolulu Weekly, publisher Laurie V. Carlson noted the Stephens Media Group has offered to buy the Journal, but Honolulu Weekly refused its offer. She added, "Apparently Stephens sees the Journal as a threat to their printing and daily newspaper monopoly because they are launching what they refer to as an alternative (to what, one might ask?) publication. We suspect that whatever they come up with will be entertainment heavy and will avoid the serious issues that can draw criticism and cancelled advertising orders from the advertising community."

In December 2006 the aforementioned Stephens publication made its debut as Big Island Weekly. Speaking on the Journal's demise, Carlson told the Honolulu Star-Bulletin that "[Stephens] can run something that was heavily subsidized and we can't. It's a very sad thing."
