= George W. M. Reynolds =

British writer (1814–1879)

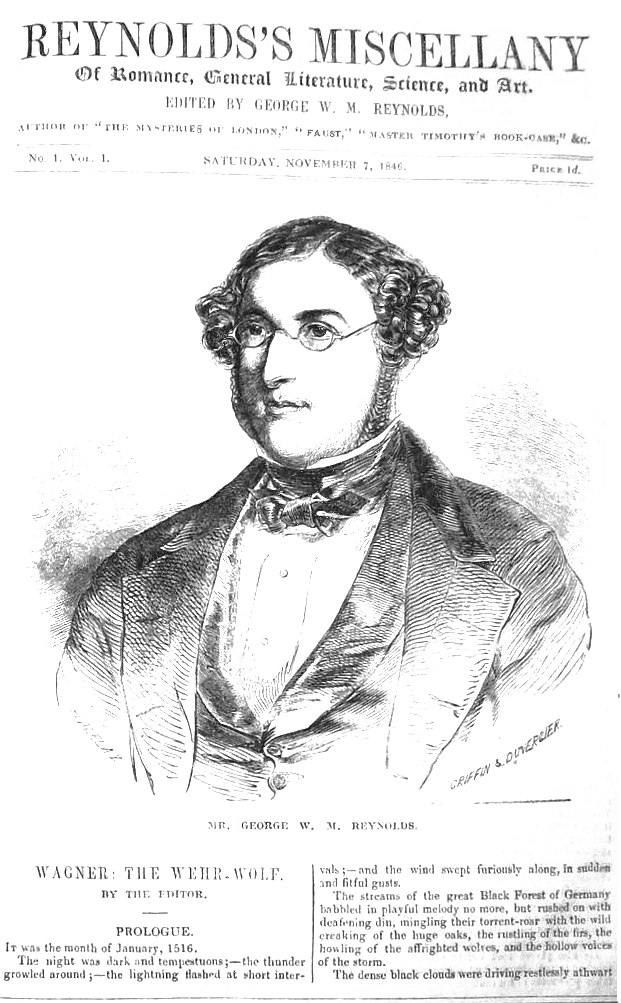
Portrait of Reynolds on the first page of the first issue of Reynolds's Miscellany, November 1846, price one penny. The text of the first installment of Wagner the Wehr-Wolf begins at the bottom of the page.

George William MacArthur Reynolds (23 July 1814 – 20 June 1879) was a British fiction writer and journalist.

Reynolds was born in Sandwich, Kent, the son of Captain Sir George Reynolds, a flag officer of the Royal Navy. Reynolds was educated first at Dr. Nance's school in Ashford, Kent, and then attended the Royal Military College, Sandhurst. He was intended for a career in the British Army, but his parents died during 1829 and, with his subsequent inheritance, he decided to quit the military and devote himself instead to literary pursuits. He left Sandhurst on 13 September 1830 and for the next few years he traveled a great deal, particularly in France, and became a naturalised French citizen. He began residence in Paris in 1834, where he started a daily English newspaper. The venture failed, and Reynolds returned bankrupt to England in 1836. He married fellow writer Susannah Frances Reynolds in 1835.

Reynolds served as editor of The Teetotaler (a weekly journal advocating teetotalism) beginning in 1840. His famous literary works include The Mysteries of London (1844-45), Joseph Wilmot; or, the Memoirs of a Man-Servant (1854-55) and Agnes; or, Beauty and Pleasure (1857).

== Writing ==
Reynolds was a prolific writer of popular fiction starting from The Youthful Imposter, published in 1835 which was then republished later as The Parricide; or, The Youth's Career of Crime. After the publication of his first novel Reynolds then assumed the editorship of The Monthly Magazine, a position which he held between 1837 and 1838 and wrote articles under the pseudonym of "Parisianus." Almost forgotten now, during his lifetime he was more read than Dickens or Thackeray; in his obituary, the trade magazine The Bookseller called Reynolds "the most popular writer of our times" ("Obituary" 600). His best-known work was the long-running serial The Mysteries of London (1844), which borrowed liberally in concept from Eugène Sue's Les Mystères de Paris (The Mysteries of Paris). It sold 40,000 copies a week in penny instalments and more than a million copies cumulatively before it was issued in bound volumes, enjoying an international circulation in French, German, Italian, and Spanish translations. Although it was outlawed by the authorities, the German version achieved the status of a cult favourite on the Russian black market.

The Mysteries of London and its even lengthier sequel, The Mysteries of the Court of London, are considered to be among the seminal works of the Victorian "urban mysteries" genre, a style of sensational fiction which adapted elements of Gothic novels – with their haunted castles, innocent noble damsels in distress and nefarious villains – to produce stories which instead emphasized the poverty, crime, and violence of a great metropolis, complete with detailed and often sympathetic descriptions of the lives of lower-class lawbreakers and extensive glossaries of thieves' cant, all interwoven with a frank sexuality not usually found in popular fiction of the time.

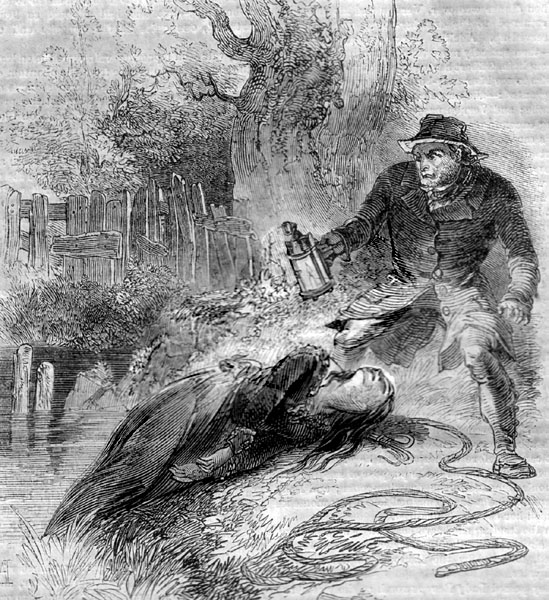
An illustration from The Mysteries of London

The Mysteries of London, like most of Reynolds' works, was published first as a weekly penny dreadful, or "Penny Blood", illustrated with lurid engravings and circulating mainly among readers of limited means and education. Although Reynolds was unusual in his religious skepticism (one of the main characters in The Mysteries of London was a clergyman turned libertine) and political radicalism, his tales were intended for his mostly middle- and lower-class readers; they featured "hump-backed dwarves, harridans and grave-robbers [who] groped past against a background of workhouses, jails, execution yards, thieves' kitchens and cemeteries. His readers could depend on him to bring in the theme of maiden virtue rudely strumpeted as often as possible."

Reynolds' Wagner, the Wehr-Wolf was a gothic novel which described how the title character became a werewolf after making a pact with the devil. Wagner, the Wehr-Wolf was republished in 1975 by Dover Books with an introduction and bibliography of Reynolds by E. F. Bleiler.

His novel, Mary Price; or the Memoirs of a Servant Girl, was adapted into the melodrama Mary Price; or the Adventures of a Servant Girl, and premiered at the Scala Theatre, then the Queen's Theatre.

Reynolds's novels remained in print on both sides of the Atlantic longer than those of many of his contemporaries. An 1875 edition of Reynolds's Ciprina, published in Philadelphia, lists 40 novels including Mysteries of London under the heading "George W. M. Reynolds' Great Works", priced between 50 cents and $1.00. The Mysteries of the Court of London, translated into Marathi as well as Urdu, remained a best-seller in India well into the twentieth century. The Marathi translation was done by K.B. Mande in the early 20th century and was titled The Secret Deeds of the Elites of London. It was very popular in the Marathi-speaking area, as is evident by numerous references to the text in early 20th-century Marathi literature.

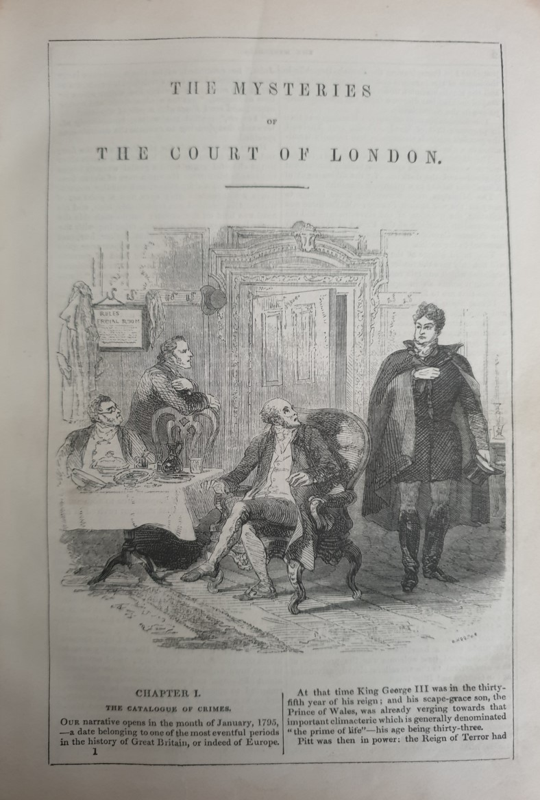
The first issue of The Mysteries of the Court of London (1849–56)

== Chartism ==
Reynolds was also a major figure in the Chartist movement. In 1846, he founded two magazines, Reynolds' Miscellany (RM) and The London Journal (LJ). In 1849, he founded Reynolds's Political Instructor, which in May 1850 became Reynolds Weekly Newspaper, the leading radical newspaper of the post-Chartist era. It long survived him, ending publication in 1967 as the Sunday Citizen. Edwin Brett, a fellow chartist and publisher of penny dreadfuls, became a lifelong friend.

For both Reynolds's Political Instructor and Reynolds's Weekly Newspaper, between 1849 and 1856, he would write a signed editorial every week in which he gave his opinion on the pressing political matters of the day.

In 1854, he relocated to Herne Bay in Kent, where he became one of the town's Improvement Commissioners. Reynolds was an advocate of British Republicanism; much of his journalism, especially during the 1870s, "promoted a levelling agenda against traditional social hierarchies and accentuated the difficulties of the British throne".

== Works ==
A prolific novelist, the list of Reynolds's works is long; matters are made more complex by the fact that American publishers often attributed the authorship of various anonymously written books to Reynolds as well. Furthermore, although he is known as a penny blood author, not all of his works appeared as serialised penny instalments. The following works have, as a result of research by E. F. Bleiler, been confirmed to have been definitely authored by Reynolds:

=== Novels ===
- The Youthful Imposter - (published in 3 vols by Librarie des Estrangers in 1835. Revised edition, The Parricide; or, The Youth's Career of Crime, published by John Dicks, 1847)
- The Baroness: A Novel - (serialised in the Monthly Magazine in 1837, under the pseudonym of "Parisianus")
- Pickwick Abroad; or, The Tour in France - (serialised in the Monthly Magazine between 1837 and 1838)
- Alfred de Rosann; or, The Adventures of a French Gentleman - (serialised in the Monthly Magazine in 1838)
- Grace Darling; or, the Heroine of the Ferne Islands - (published in one volume by George Henderson in 1839)
- Robert Macaire in England - (published in 3 vols by Thomas Tegg in 1839)
- The Steam Packet: A Tale of the River and Ocean - (published in one volume by Willoughby in 1840)
- The Drunkard's Tale - (serialised in The Teetotaller in 1840)
- Master Timothy's Bookcase - (issued in weekly parts beginning 15 July 1841 and published as a single volume by W. Emans in 1842)
- The Mysteries of London; First Series - (issued in weekly parts beginning in October 1844. Published in two volumes by G. Vickers in 1846)
- Faust: A Romance of the Secret Tribunals - (serialised in The London Journal between 4 October 1845 and 26 September 1846. Published in one volume by G Vickers in 1847)
- The Mysteries of London; Second Series - (issued in weekly parts beginning on 3 October 1846 and 16 September 1848. Published in two volumes by G. Vickers in 1848)
- Wagner, the Wehr-Wolf - (serialised in Reynolds's Miscellany between 6 November 1846 and 24 July 1847) - sequel to Faust
- The Days of Hogarth; or, the Mysteries of Old London - (serialised in Reynolds's Miscellany between 29 May 1847 and 29 April 1848)
- The Coral Island, or the Hereditary Curse - (serialised in Reynolds's Miscellany between 15 July 1848 and 31 March 1849)
- The Mysteries of the Court of London; First Series - (issued in weekly parts between 9 September 1848 and 17 August 1850. Published in two volumes by John Dicks in 1850)
- The Pixy; or, The Unbaptised Child - (published in one volume by John Dicks in 1848).
- The Bronze Statue; or, the Virgin's Kiss - (serialised in Reynolds's Miscellany between 31 March 1849 and 14 March 1850)
- The Seamstress; a Domestic Tale - (serialised in Reynolds's Miscellany between 23 March 1850 and 10 August 1850)
- Pope Joan, the Female Pontiff - (serialised in Reynolds's Miscellany between 10 August 1850 and 25 January 1851)
- The Mysteries of the Court of London; Second Series - (issued in weekly parts between 24 August 1850 and August 1852)
- Kenneth; a Romance of the Highlands - (serialised in Reynolds's Miscellany between 25 January 1851 and 27 December 1851)
- The Necromancer - (serialised in Reynolds's Miscellany between 27 December 1851 and 31 July 1852)
- Mary Price; or the Memoirs of a Servant Girl - (issued in weekly parts between November 1851 and October 1853)
- The Mysteries of the Court of London; Third Series - (issued in weekly parts between 1 May 1852 and 3 December 1853)
- The Massacre of Glencoe; a Historical Tale - (serialised in Reynolds's Miscellany between 31 July 1852 and 18 June 1853)
- The Soldier's Wife - (issued in weekly parts between November 1852 and June 1853. Published in one volume by John Dicks in 1853)
- The Ryehouse Plot; or, Ruth, the Conspirator's Daughter - (serialised in Reynolds's Miscellany between 18 June 1853 and 19 August 1854)
- Joseph Wilmot; or, the Memoirs of a Man-Servant - (issued in weekly parts between 29 July 1853 and 4 July 1855)
- Rosa Lambert; or, the Memoirs of an Unfortunate Woman - (issued in weekly parts between 4 November 1853 and October 1854)
- The Mysteries of the Court of London; Fourth Series - (issued in weekly parts between 30 December 1853 and 5 December 1855)
- May Middleton; or, The History of a Fortune - (serialised in Reynolds's Miscellany between 19 August 1854 and 6 January 1855)
- Omar, a Tale of the War - (serialised in Reynolds's Miscellany between 6 January 1855 and 5 January 1856)
- The Loves of the Harem: A Romance of Constantinople - (issued in weekly parts between 3 February 1855 and 7 July 1856)
- Ellen Percy; or, The Memoirs of an Actress - (issued in weekly parts between 21 July 1855 and September 1857)
- Agnes; or, Beauty and Pleasure - (issued in weekly parts between 12 December 1855 and January 1857)
- Leila; or, the Star of Mingrelia - (serialised in Reynolds's Miscellany between 5 January 1855 and 5 July 1856)
- The Empress Eugenie's Boudoir - (issued in weekly parts beginning 4 February 1857; exact date of final serial unknown)
- Margaret; or, the Discarded Queen - (serialised in Reynolds's Miscellany between 5 July 1856 and 11 July 1857)
- The Young Duchess; or, Memoirs of a Lady of Quality - (serialised in Reynolds's Miscellany between 17 June 1857 and 9 June 1858) - sequel to Ellen Percy
- Canonbury House; or, the Queen's Prophecy - (serialised in Reynolds's Miscellany between 11 July 1857 and 1 May 1858)
- Mary Stuart, Queen of Scots - (serialised in Reynolds's Miscellany between 14 May 1859 and 24 December 1859)

=== Shorter fiction and short stories ===
- The Father - (serialised in the Monthly Magazine in 1838)
- Mary Hamel - (serialised in the Monthly Magazine in 1838)
- The Appointment: A Tale - (serialised in The Isis in 1839)
- Noctes Pickwickianae - (serialised in The Teetotaller in 1840)
- Pickwick Married - (serialised in The Teetotaller in 1841)
- The Assassin - (appeared in The London Journal on 29 March 1845)
- Margaret Catchpole - (appeared in The London Journal on 5 April 1845)
- The Matrimonial Advertisement - (appeared in Reynolds's Miscellany on 30 January 1847)
- The Castellan's Daughter - (serialised in Reynolds's Miscellany between 22 and 29 June 1850)
- The Greek Maiden; or The Banquet of Blood - (appeared in Reynolds's Miscellany on 27 July 1850)
- The Janizary; or, The Massacre of the Christians - (serialised in Reynolds's Miscellany between 2–9 November 1851).
- The Prophecy; or, The Lost Son - (serialised in Reynolds's Miscellany between 7–10 December 1851)
- The Young Fisherman - (serialised in Reynolds's Miscellany between 5 October 1861 and 9 November 1861)

=== Translation ===
- The Last Day of a Condemned Man (1829) by Victor Hugo

=== Poetry ===
- A Sequel to Don Juan (London: Paget and Co., 1843)

=== Miscellaneous works ===
- The Errors of the Christian Religion Exposed (London: Richard Carlile, 1832)
- The Modern Literature of France, 2 vols (London: George Henderson, 1839)
- The Anatomy of Intemperance (London: United Temperance Union, 1840)
- The French Self-Instructor (London: Dicks, 1846)
- 'The Foundation of the Ottoman Empire' (serialised in Reynolds's Miscellany between 18 and 25 February 1854).
- The Self-Instructor (London: Dicks, 1861)

=== Journalism career ===
- The London and Paris Courier (editor between January–August 1836)
- The Monthly Magazine of Politics, Literature, and the Belles-Lettres (editor between 1837 and 1838)
- The Teetotaller (editor between June 1840 and September 1841)
- The London Journal (editor between March 1845 and November 1846)
- Reynolds's Miscellany (editor between 1846 and 1869)
- Reynolds's Political Instructor (editor between 1849 and 1850)
- Reynolds's Weekly Newspaper (editor between 1850 and 1879)
- Bow Bells (editor from 1864 until 1868).

Media offices
Preceded by New position	Editor of Reynold's News; 1850–1879	Succeeded by Edward Reynolds
