= Orville Augustus Roorbach =

American bibliographer, publisher, and bookseller; (1803–1861)

- Born: January 20, 1803; Tivoli
- Died: June 21, 1861 (aged 58); Schenectady
- Occupation: Bookseller, bibliographer, publisher

Orville Augustus Roorbach (1803–1861) was an American publisher and bibliographer.

Roorbach was born in Red Hook, Dutchess County, New York, on January 20, 1803; died in Schenectady, New York, on June 21, 1861. He was educated in Albany, opened a book-store in Charleston, South Carolina, about 1826, and was engaged in business there till 1845. During the latter part of that time he also carried on the book trade in New York City, where he moved in 1845, and continued in that business until 1855, when he began to publish and edit the Booksellers' Medium. He compiled and arranged the Bibliotheca Americana, a catalogue of American publications, including reprints and original works from 1820 until 1861 (4 vols., New York, 1852–1861).
