= Ko Hoku o Ka Pakipika =

Hawaiian-language newspaper (1861–1863)

Ka Hoku o Ka Pakipika
- Type: Weekly newspaper
- Founded: 1861
- Ceased publication: 1863
- Language: Hawaiian
- City: Honolulu
- Country: Kingdom of Hawaii

Ka Hoku o Ka Pakipika (English for "The Star of the Pacific") was a weekly Hawaiian-language newspaper that was active between 1861 and 1863. It was the first newspaper in history published in Hawaiian and by Native Hawaiians. King Kalākaua sponsored the newspaper along with other publications.

The paper tended to challenge the idea that the Native Hawaiians were uncivilized. It wrote about the threats to Hawaiian culture and the islands' native population.
