= The Mysteries of Paris =

1843 novel by Eugène Sue

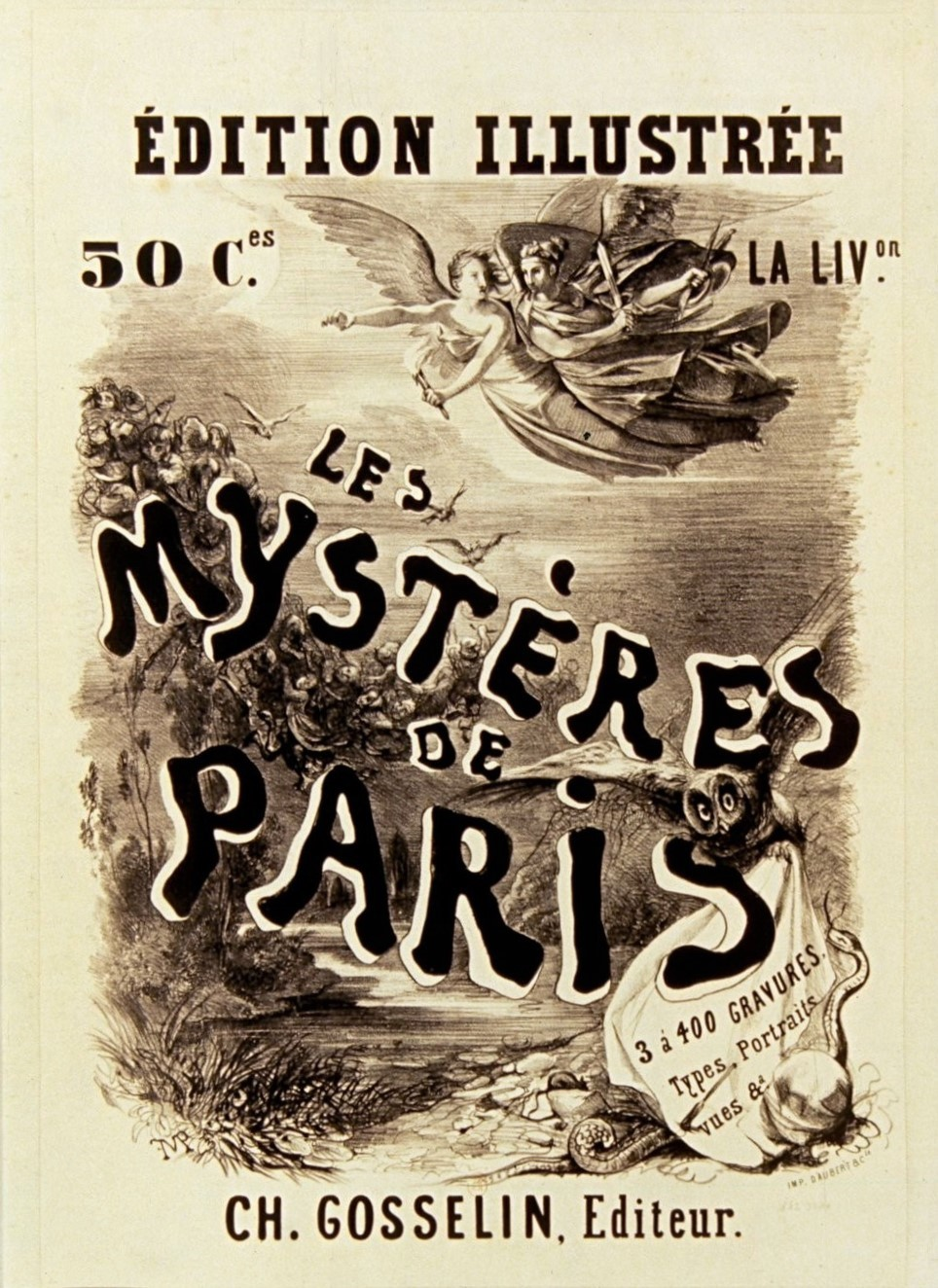
- Poster announcing the publication of Les Mystères de Paris
- Author: Eugène Sue
- Original title: Les Mystères de Paris
- Language: French
- Publication date: 1843
- Publication place: France
- Media type: Print

The Mysteries of Paris (French: Les Mystères de Paris) is a novel by Eugène Sue. It was published serially in 90 parts in Journal des débats from 19 June 1842 until 15 October 1843, making it one of the first serial novels (feuilleton) published in France. It tells the story of a mysterious man named Rodolphe, who seeks to restore social justice in 19th-century Paris and comes to the aid of various characters, including a prostitute and a criminal. An instant success, The Mysteries of Paris singlehandedly increased the circulation of Journal des débats and founded the "city mysteries" genre, spawning many imitations.

== Major characters and roles ==
The hero of the novel is the mysterious and distinguished Rodolphe, who is really the Grand Duke of Gerolstein (a fictional grand duchy of Germany) but is disguised as a Parisian worker. Rodolphe can speak in argot, is extremely strong and a good fighter. Yet he also shows great compassion for the lower classes, good judgment, and a brilliant mind. He can navigate all layers of society in order to understand their problems, and to understand how the different social classes are linked. Rodolphe is accompanied by his friends Sir Walter Murph, an Englishman, and David, a gifted black doctor, formerly a slave.

The first figures they meet are Le Chourineur and La Goualeuse. Rodolphe saves La Goualeuse from Le Chourineur's brutality, and saves Le Chourineur from himself, knowing that the man still has some good in him. La Goualeuse is a prostitute, and Le Chourineur is a former butcher who has served 15 years in prison for murder. Both characters are grateful for Rodolphe's assistance, as are many other characters in the novel.

Though Rodolphe is described as a flawless man, Sue otherwise depicts the Parisian nobility as deaf to the misfortunes of the common people and focused on meaningless intrigues. For this reason, some, such as Alexandre Dumas, have considered the novel's ending a failure. Rodolphe goes back to Gerolstein to take on the role to which he was destined by birth, rather than staying in Paris to help the lower classes.

== Themes and style ==
Sue was the first author to bring together so many characters from different levels of society within one novel, and thus his book was popular with readers from all classes. Its realistic descriptions of the poor and disadvantaged became a critique of social institutions, echoing the socialist position leading up to the Revolutions of 1848. "Sue made a fortune even as he made a political statement, seeking to convince his readers that the suffering classes are victims rather than criminals." Sue showed how vice was not the only cause of suffering, but also caused by inhumane social conditions.

The novel is a melodramatic depiction of a world where good and evil are clearly distinct. Rodolphe, the Prince, embodies good. Ferand, a lawyer and representative of a new commercial order, embodies evil.

The novel was partly inspired by the Memoirs (1828) of Eugène François Vidocq, a French criminal and criminalist whose life story inspired several other writers, including Victor Hugo and Honoré de Balzac. Its greatest inspiration, however, was the works of James Fenimore Cooper: Sue took the plot structure of the Natty Bumppo novels and moved them to the city where buildings replaced trees and underworld gangs replaced Indians.

== Criticism ==
The most extended criticism of the novel was by Karl Marx, who discussed it in The Holy Family (1845). Marx used the novel to attack the Young Hegelians who he thought advocated a too simplistic view of reality. Marx found Sue unintentionally making a mockery of mystery, turning character into caricature. Marx's basic point was that although the social conditions of Paris under Louis Philippe had indeed improved, the underlying belief systems were still medieval. Whatever sympathy Sue created for the poor, he failed to come to terms with the true nature of the city, which had changed little.

Edgar Allan Poe wrote an essay about the novel. He considers the incidents that follow the premise to be credible but that the premise itself is laughably impossible.

== Legacy ==
Numerous novels inspired by The Mysteries of Paris were published all over the Western world, creating the City mysteries genre that explored the "mysteries and miseries" of cities. Works in the genre include Les Mystères de Marseille by Émile Zola, The Mysteries of London by George W. M. Reynolds, Les Mystères de Londres by Paul Féval, Les Mystères de Lyon (featuring the Nyctalope) by Jean de La Hire, I misteri di Napoli by Francesco Mastriani, the Mystères de Munich, Les Nouveaux Mystères de Paris (featuring Nestor Burma) by Léo Malet, Die Mysterien von Berlin by August Brass, Die Geheimnisse von Hamburg by Johann Wilhelm Christern, De Verborgenheden van Amsterdam by L. van Eikenhorst and many others.

In America, cheap pamphlet and serial fiction exposed the "mysteries and miseries" of New York, Baltimore, Boston, San Francisco and even small towns such as Lowell and Fitchburg, Massachusetts. Ned Buntline wrote The Mysteries and Miseries of New York in 1848, but the leading American writer in the genre was George Lippard whose best seller was The Quaker City, or The Monks of Monk Hall: a Romance of Philadelphia Life, Mystery and Crime (1844); he went on to found the paper The Quaker City as a vehicle for more of his mysteries and miseries. In 1988, Michael Chabon paid tribute to the genre with The Mysteries of Pittsburgh.

Dumas, at the urging of his publishers, was inspired to write The Count of Monte Cristo in part by the runaway success of The Mysteries of Paris. He had been working on a series of newspaper articles about historical tourism in Paris and was convinced to turn them into a sensationalist melodramatic novel.

== Adaptations ==
The original novel was very long, in some editions over 1000 pages. It has been adapted for the stage, and was made into a feature film several times.

- Les mystères de Paris (1911), a silent film directed by Albert Capellani
- The Mysteries of Paris (1922), a silent film serial directed by Charles Burguet
- The Mysteries of Paris (1935), a French film starring Madeleine Ozeray as Fleur-de-Marie
- The Mysteries of Paris (1943), a French adaptation directed by Jacques de Baroncelli
- The Mysteries of Paris (1957), a French-Italian co-production
- Les Mystères de Paris (1962), a French film by André Hunebelle starring Jean Marais.
- Les mystères de Paris (1980), a six episode television miniseries

== English translations ==
The first two translations were published in the United States in 1843, one by Charles H. Town (for Harper & Brothers) and another by Henry C. Deming (for J. Winchester's New World). The Town translation was republished in England under different names, such as "Charles Rochford" (for Charles Daly, 1844) and "J. D. Smith" (for D.N. Carvalho, 1844).

In 1844, an uncredited translation was published for W. Dugdale.

In 1845, two uncredited translations were published, one for Edmund Appleyard and another for Chapman & Hall.

In 1846 followed another translation, by Henry Downes Miles, which was published in England for William M. Clark.

In 1869, there was another translation by Henry Llewellyn Williams (for F. M. Lupton).

In 1873, another uncredited translation was published by George Routledge.

Most recently, the novel was translated in 2015 by Carolyn Betensky and Jonathan Loesberg for Penguin Classics. Claiming to be the first English translation in over a century, it is over 1,300 pages long.
