= Eugène Sue =

French writer (1804–1857)

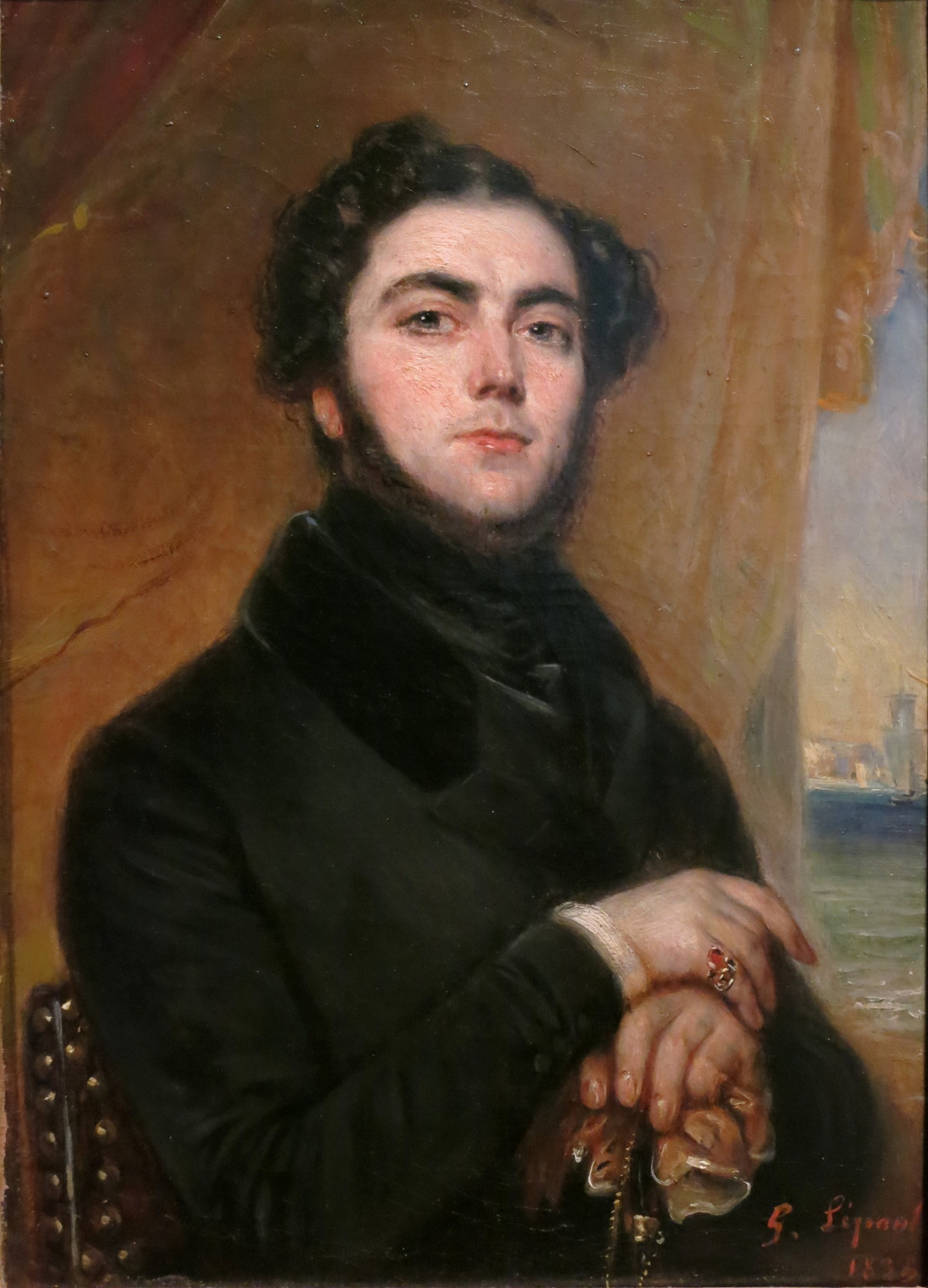
- Portrait of Sue by François-Gabriel Lépaulle, 1835
- Born: Joseph Marie Eugène Sue; 26 January 1804; Paris, Seine, French First Republic
- Died: 3 August 1857 (aged 53); Annecy-le-Vieux, Savoy, Second French Empire
- Resting place: Cimetière de Loverchy, Annecy
- Education: Lycée Condorcet
- Occupation: Novelist
- Writing career
- Period: 1830–1857
- Notable works: The Mysteries of Paris, The Wandering Jew
- Notable awards: Legion of Honour
- Movement: Romanticism

Marie-Joseph "Eugène" Sue (French pronunciation: [øʒɛn sy]; 26 January 1804 – 3 August 1857) was a French novelist. He was one of several authors who popularized the genre of the serial novel in France with his very popular and widely imitated The Mysteries of Paris, which was published in a newspaper from 1842 to 1843.

== Early life ==
Sue was born in Paris, France. He was the son of a distinguished surgeon in Napoleon's army, Jean-Joseph Sue, and had Empress Joséphine as his godmother. Sue himself acted as surgeon both in the 1823 French campaign in Spain and at the Battle of Navarino in 1827. In 1829 his father's death put him in possession of a considerable fortune, and he settled in Paris.

== Literary career ==
Sue's naval experiences supplied much of the material for his first novels, Kernock le pirate (1830), Atar-Gull (1831), La Salamandre (1832), La Coucaratcha (1832–1834), and others, written at the height of the Romantic movement of 1830. In the quasi-historical style he wrote Jean Cavalier, ou Les Fanatiques des Cevennes (1840) and Latréaumont (1837). His Mathilde (1841) contains the first known expression of the popular proverb "La vengeance se mange très-bien froide", translated in 1846 as "Revenge is very good eaten cold" by D. G. Osborne, also constituting the first known English usage of the proverb later expressed in English as "Revenge is a dish best served cold".

He was strongly affected by the socialist ideas of the day, and these prompted his most famous works, the anti-Catholic novels: The Mysteries of Paris (Les Mystères de Paris) (published in Journal des débats from 19 June 1842 until 15 October 1843) and The Wandering Jew (Le Juif errant; 1844–1845), which were among the most popular specimens of the serial novel. The Wandering Jew is a Gothic novel depicting the titular character in conflict with the villain, a murderous Jesuit named Rodin. These works depicted the intrigues of the nobility and the harsh life of the underclass to a wide public. Les Mystères de Paris spawned a class of imitations all over the world, the city mysteries. Sue's books caused controversy because of their strongly violent scenes, and also because of their socialist and anti-clerical subtexts.

He followed up with some singular books: Les Sept pêchés capitaux (1847–1849) contained stories to illustrate each of the seven deadly sins; Les Mystères du peuple (1849–1856), a long series of historical novels which was suppressed by the censor in 1857; and several others, all on a very large scale, though the number of volumes gives an exaggerated idea of their length. Les Mystères du peuple is a lengthy series of novels and novellas dealing with French history. Les Mystères du peuple begins with a novel graphically depicting slavery in the Roman Empire (The Iron Collar). Other Les Mystères du peuple novels dealt with Early Christianity (The Silver Cross), King Clovis I (The Poniard's Hilt), the founding of the Duchy of Normandy (The Iron Arrow-Head), the Crusades in Palestine (The Pilgrim's Shell), the Albigensian Crusade (The Iron Pincers), the Jacquerie (The Iron Trevet), Joan of Arc (The Executioner's Knife) and the French Revolution (Sword of Honor). The novels were translated into English (as the Mysteries of the People) and published in New York by Daniel De Leon and his son, Solon. Some of Sue's books, among them The Wandering Jew and The Mysteries of Paris, were dramatized by himself, usually in collaboration with others. His period of greatest success and popularity coincided with that of Alexandre Dumas, with whom he has been compared.

According to Umberto Eco, parts of Sue's book Les Mystères du peuple served as a source for Maurice Joly in his 1864 work Dialogue in Hell Between Machiavelli and Montesquieu, a book attacking Napoleon III and his political ambitions. The two are depicted in Will Eisner's cartoon book The Plot, co-authored with Eco.

== Political career ==
After the French Revolution of 1848, Sue was elected to the Legislative Assembly from the Paris-Seine constituency in April 1850. He was exiled from Paris in consequence of his protest against the French coup d'état of 1851. This exile stimulated his literary production. Sue died in Annecy-le-Vieux, Savoy on 3 August 1857 and was buried at the Cimetière de Loverchy (Annecy) in the Non-Catholic's Carré des "Dissidents".

== Legacy ==
- Rue Eugène Sue in the 18th arrondissement of Paris near the Marcadet-Poissonniers station of the Paris Métro, not far from Montmartre and the Sacré-Cœur.
- Calle Eugenio Sue in Polanco.
- Sue is a character in Umberto Eco's 2010 novel The Prague Cemetery.

== Bibliography ==
- Kernock le pirate (1830)
- Atar-Gull (1831)
- La Salamandre (2 vols, 1832)
- La Coucaratcha (4 vols, 1832–1834)
- Jean Cavalier, ou Les Fanatiques des Cevennes (4 vols, 1840)
- Latréaumont (2 vols, 1837)
- Mathilde (6 vols, 1841)
- The Mysteries of Paris (Les Mystères de Paris) (published in Journal des débats from 19 June 1842 until 15 October 1843)
- The Wandering Jew (Le Juif errant; 10 vols, 1844–1845)
- Les Sept pêchés capitaux (The 7 Deadly Sins (16 vols, 1847–1849):
1. Pride (The Duchess)
2. Envy (Frederik Bastian)
3. Wrath (Tison d'Enfer)
4. Lust (Madeleine)
5. Sloth (Cousin Michel)
6. Avarice (The Millionaires)
7. Gluttony (Doctor Gasterini)
- Les Mystères du peuple (The Mysteries of the People) (1849–1856):
1. "The Gold Sickle; or Hena, the Virgin of the Isle of Sen"
2. "The Brass Bell; or The Chariot of Death"
3. "The Iron Collar; or Faustine and Syomara"
4. "The Silver Cross; or The Carpenter of Nazareth"
5. "The Casque’s Lark; or Victoria, The Mother of the Fields"
6. "The Poniard's Hilt; or Karadeucq and Ronan"
7. "The Branding Needle; or The Monastery of Charolles"
8. "The Abbatial Crosier; or Bonaik and Septimine"
9. "The Carlovingian Coins; or The Daughters of Charlemagne"
10. "The Iron Arrow-Head; or The Maid of the Buckler"
11. "The Infant’s Skull; or The End of the World"
12. "The Shell of the Pilgrim; or Fergan the Quarryman"
13. "The Iron Pincers; or Mylio and Karvel"
14. "The Iron Trevet; or Jocelyn the Champion"
15. "The Knife of the Executioner; or Joan of Arc"
16. "The Pocket Bible; or Christian the Printer"
17. "The Blacksmith’s Hammer; or The Peasant-Code"
18. "The Sword of Honour; or The Foundation of the French Republic"
19. "The Galley Slave’s Ring; or The Family of Lebrenn"
