= Serpent symbolism =

Mythological symbol

The serpent, or snake, is one of the oldest and most widespread mythological symbols. The word is derived from Latin serpens, a crawling animal or snake. Snakes have been associated with some of the oldest rituals known to humankind.

They represent dual expression of good and evil.

The historian of religions Mircea Eliade observed in The Myth of the Eternal Return that "the serpent symbolizes chaos, the formless and nonmanifested".

In The Symbolism of the Cross, Traditionalist René Guénon contended that "the serpent will depict the series of the cycles of universal manifestation", "the indefinitude of universal Existence," and "the being's attachment to the indefinite series of cycles of manifestation."

Recent academic book-length treatments of serpent symbolism include James H. Charlesworth's The Good and Evil Serpent (2010) and Charles William Dailey's The Serpent Symbol in Tradition (2022).

In psychology, Carl Jung interpreted the serpent as an archetype of the unconscious and personal transformation.

The alchemical symbol of the ouroboros—a serpent eating its own tail—represents eternal return, unity of opposites, and the cyclic nature of the cosmos.

== Evolutionary origins ==
The anthropologist Lynne Isbell has argued that, as primates, the serpent as a symbol of death is built into our unconscious minds because of our evolutionary history. Isbell argues that for millions of years snakes were the only significant predators of primates, and that this explains why fear of snakes is one of the most common phobias worldwide and why the symbol of the serpent is so prevalent in world mythology; the serpent is an innate image of danger and death.

Furthermore, the psychoanalyst Joseph Lewis Henderson and the ethnologist Maude Oakes have argued that the serpent is a symbol of initiation and rebirth precisely because it is a symbol of death.

Using phylogenetical and statistical methods on related motifs from folklore and myth, French comparativist Julien d'Huy managed to reconstruct a possible archaic narrative about the serpent. In this Paleolithic "ophidian" myth, snakes are connected to rains and storms, and even to water sources. In regards to the latter, it blocks rivers and other water sources in exchange for human sacrifices and/or material good offerings.

== Values ==
=== Fertility and rebirth ===
Historically, serpents and snakes represent fertility, health, or a creative life force. As snakes shed their skin through sloughing, they serve as symbols of rebirth, transformation, immortality, and healing.

In some Abrahamic traditions, the serpent represents sexual desire. According to some interpretations of the Midrash, the serpent represents sexual passion. In Hinduism, Kundalini is a dormant energy lying like a coiled serpent.

The Hopi people of North America performed an annual snake dance to celebrate the union of Snake Youth (a Sky spirit) and Snake Girl (an Underworld spirit) and to renew the fertility of Nature. During the dance, live snakes were handled, and at the end of the dance the snakes were released into the fields to guarantee good crops. "The snake dance is a prayer to the spirits of the clouds, the thunder and the lightning, that the rain may fall on the growing crops."

== Associated animals ==
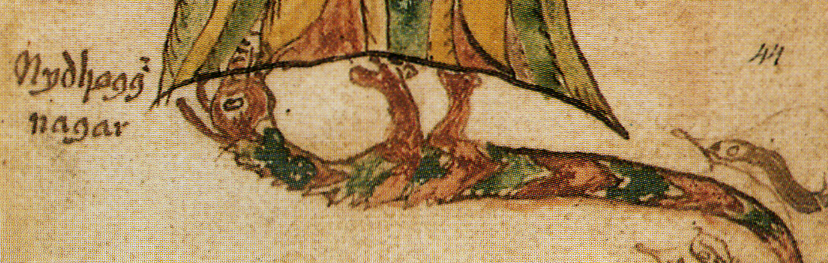
Níðhöggr gnaws the roots of Yggdrasil in this illustration from a 17th-century Icelandic manuscript.

Similarly Níðhöggr (Nidhogg Nagar), the dragon of Norse mythology, eats from the roots of the Yggdrasil, the World Tree.

The Vision Serpent was a symbol of rebirth in Maya mythology, with origins going back to earlier Maya conceptions, lying at the center of the world as the Mayans conceived it. "It is in the center axis atop the World Tree. Essentially the World Tree and the Vision Serpent, representing the king, created the center axis which communicates between the spiritual and the earthly worlds or planes. It is through ritual that the king could bring the center axis into existence in the temples and create a doorway to the spiritual world, and with it power."

== Mythology and religion ==
=== Ancient Near East ===
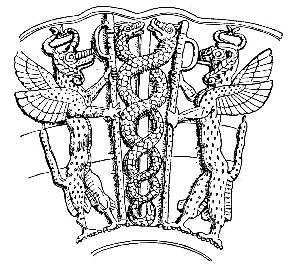
The "libation vase of Gudea" with the dragon Mushussu, dedicated to Ningishzida (twentieth century BCE short chronology). The caduceus is interpreted as depicting the god himself.

In ancient Mesopotamia, Nirah, the messenger god of Ištaran, was represented as a serpent on kudurrus, or boundary stones. Representations of two intertwined serpents are common in Sumerian art and Neo-Sumerian artwork and still appear sporadically on cylinder seals and amulets until as late as the thirteenth century BCE. The horned viper (Cerastes cerastes) appears in Kassite and Neo-Assyrian kudurrus and is invoked in Assyrian texts as a magical protective entity. A dragon-like creature with horns, the body and neck of a snake, the forelegs of a lion, and the hind-legs of a bird appears in Mesopotamian art from the Akkadian period until the Hellenistic period (323 BCE–31 BCE). This creature, known in Akkadian as the mušḫuššu, meaning "furious serpent", was used as a symbol for particular deities and also as a general protective emblem. It seems to have originally been the attendant of the underworld god Ninazu, but later became the attendant to the Hurrian storm-god Tishpak, as well as, later, Ninazu's son Ningishzida, the Babylonian national god Marduk, the scribal god Nabu, and the Assyrian national god Ashur.

Snake cults were well established in Canaanite religion in the Bronze Age, for archaeologists have uncovered serpent cult objects in Bronze Age strata at several pre-Israelite cities in Canaan: two at Megiddo, one at Gezer, one in the sanctum sanctorum of the Area H temple at Hazor, and two at Shechem.

In the surrounding region, serpent cult objects figured in other cultures. A late Bronze Age Hittite shrine in northern Syria contained a bronze statue of a god holding a serpent in one hand and a staff in the other. In 6th-century Babylon, a pair of bronze serpents flanked each of the four doorways of the temple of Esagila. At the Babylonian New Year's festival, the priest was to commission from a woodworker, a metalworker and a goldsmith two images, one of which "shall hold in its left hand a snake of cedar, raising its right [hand] to the god Nabu". At the tell of Tepe Gawra, at least seventeen Early Bronze Age Assyrian bronze serpents were recovered.

==== Bronze and Iron Age United Arab Emirates ====
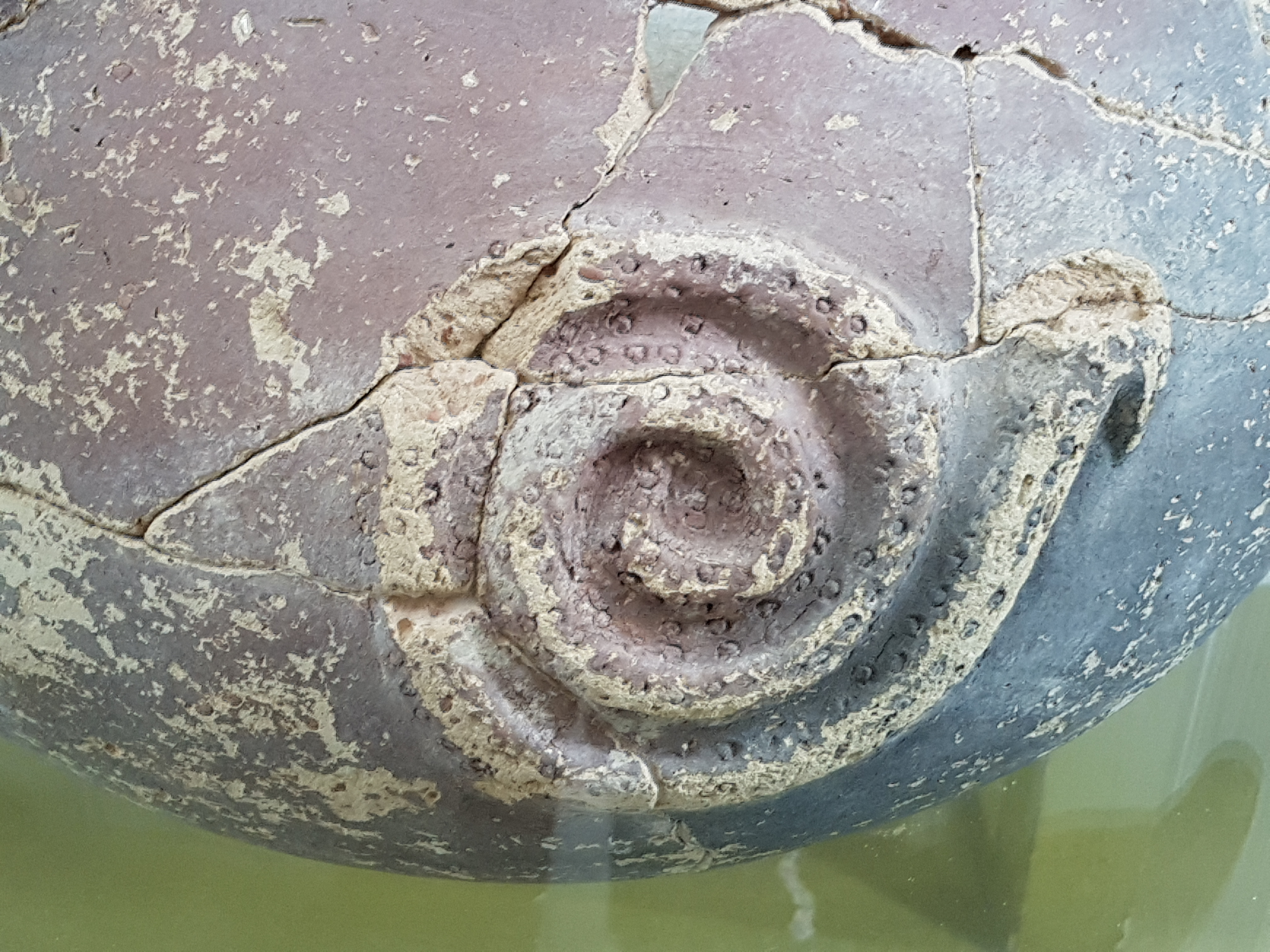
Snake decoration on Bronze Age pot from Rumailah, Al Ain

Significant finds of pottery, bronze-ware and even gold depictions of snakes have been made throughout the United Arab Emirates (UAE). The Bronze Age and Iron Age metallurgical centre of Saruq Al Hadid has yielded probably the richest trove of such objects, although finds have been made bearing snake symbols in Bronze Age sites at Rumailah, Bithnah and Masafi. Most of the depictions of snakes are similar, with a consistent dotted decoration applied to them.

Although the widespread depiction of snakes in sites across the UAE is thought by archaeologists to have a religious purpose, this remains conjecture.

==== Abrahamic Religions ====
===== Jewish beliefs =====
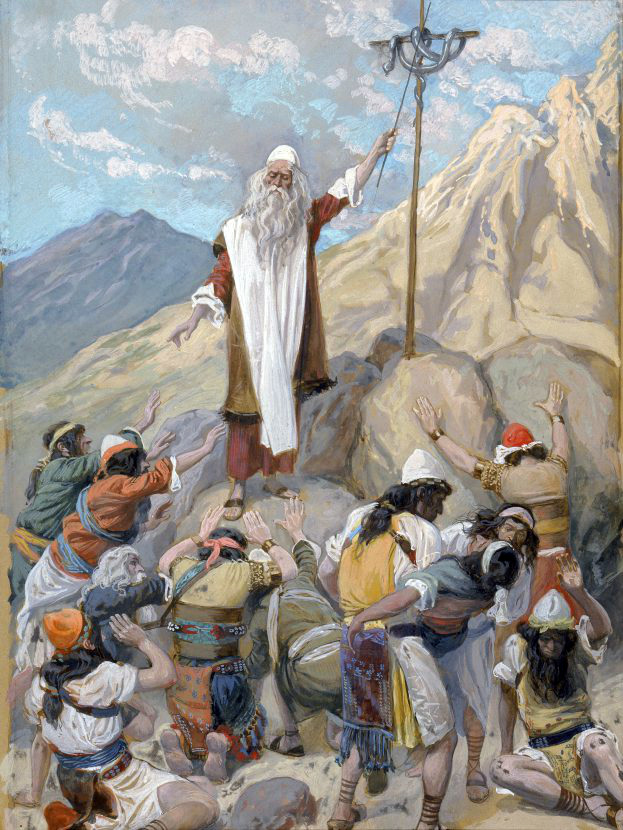
The Brazen Serpent (watercolor circa 1896–1902 by James Tissot)

In the Hebrew Bible the serpent in the Garden of Eden lured Eve with the promise of being like God into disobeying God's commands, resulting in Adam and Eve's expelling from the Garden. As punishment, the snake was forced to crawl on its belly.

The staff of Moses transformed into a snake and then back into a staff (Exodus 4:2–4). The Book of Numbers 21:6–9 provides an origin for an archaic copper serpent, Nehushtan, by associating it with Moses. This copper snake according to the Biblical text is put on a pole and used for healing.

When the reformer King Hezekiah came to the throne of Judah in the late 8th century BCE, "He removed the high places, broke the sacred pillars, smashed the idols, and broke into pieces the copper snake that Moses had made: for unto those days the children of Israel did burn incense to it: and he called it Nehushtan" (2 Kings 18:4).

===== Christian beliefs =====
In the Gospel of John 3:14–15, Jesus makes direct comparison between the raising up of the Son of Man and the act of Moses in raising up the serpent as a sign, using it as a symbol associated with salvation.

Christian Tradition also identifies Satan as a talking serpent in the Old Testament's Garden of Eden who had tempted Eve with a fruit from the Tree of the knowledge of good and evil. Eve, as well as her consort Adam, were then punished by YHWH for their disobedience to commandments outlined prior to this; had lifespan decreased, for women to suffer in birthing, as well as other torments.

Snake imagery also appears when the Israelites speak against Moses and God sends poisonous snakes down to bite them. When they repent and Moses prayed for them, God told Moses to make a snake of bronze and put it on a pole and all who were bitten by the snakes could look at it and be healed

===== Islamic beliefs =====
The flying snake Arabhar

The serpent is a recurrent motif in Islamic thought, appearing in both sacred texts representing evil and works of art. The creature is often seen as a symbol of evil and punishment. The serpent is a complex figure in Islamic thought, appearing as both a symbol of evil and a figure of wisdom. Djinn, which are likewise figures of great potential mixed with danger, are also believed to appear in the form of snakes on occasion. The Arabian Flying Snakes, also known as Arabhar, are a part of Arabian folklore and are said to live near the Arabian Sea. These snakes are believed to have the ability to fly, and their name "Arabhar" means "Arab snake."

The Islamic serpent generally follows in the tradition of earlier Abrahamic myths as a symbol for the seductive draw of wisdom. This symbolism is reflected in various stories and parables, such as the tale of the snake-catcher and the serpent from Rumi, which uses the serpent as a symbol for the sensual soul within human beings. Another story from Arabian mythology features the giant serpent Falak, which is said to live below the fish known as Bahamut and is mentioned in the One Thousand and One Nights as a dangerous monster. It is said that Falak only fears God's greater power, which prevents it from consuming all of creation.

=== Ancient Iran ===
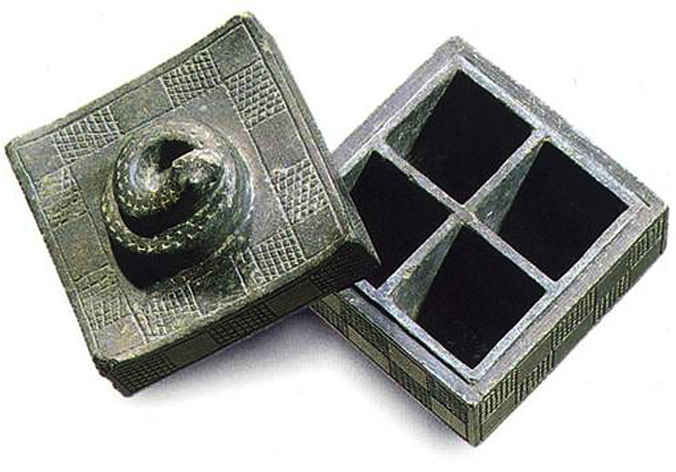
Serpent on a jewelry box from Shahdad, Iran, 2700 BC

Serpents are sacred and powerful in the thought of prehistoric cultures of Iran, having been portrayed as patrons of fertility, water and wealth in the ancient objects of Iran. They seem to have been worshipped along with the fertility goddesses from the fourth to first millennia BC, when their presence as mighty patrons and source of life and of immortality is seen in the art of Tall-i Bakun, Chogha Mish, Tepe Sialk, Jiroft culture, Shahr-e Sukhteh, Shahdad, Elamite art, Luristan art, etc.

However, it seems that the symbolic concept of the serpent was corrupted in the cultures of the Iranian plateau over time by Western influence. In Abrahamic traditions, the serpent represents sexual desire, as he lured Eve with the promise of forbidden knowledge in the Garden of Eden. As a result of such influence, Aryan religions call the serpents diabolic;Zahhak in the Shahnameh (also known as Aži Dahāka in the Avesta) is an infernal creature with two snakes on his shoulders. This replacement might be due to communication between the inhabitants of Iran and believers in Abrahamic religions, and beyond that the conversion of matriarchy into patriarchy as the social structure of Iranian plateau cultures.

=== Chinese mythology ===
In Chinese creationism mythology, Nüwa is the mother goddess who created humans from clay. She is depicted as a half snake being.

=== Greek mythology ===
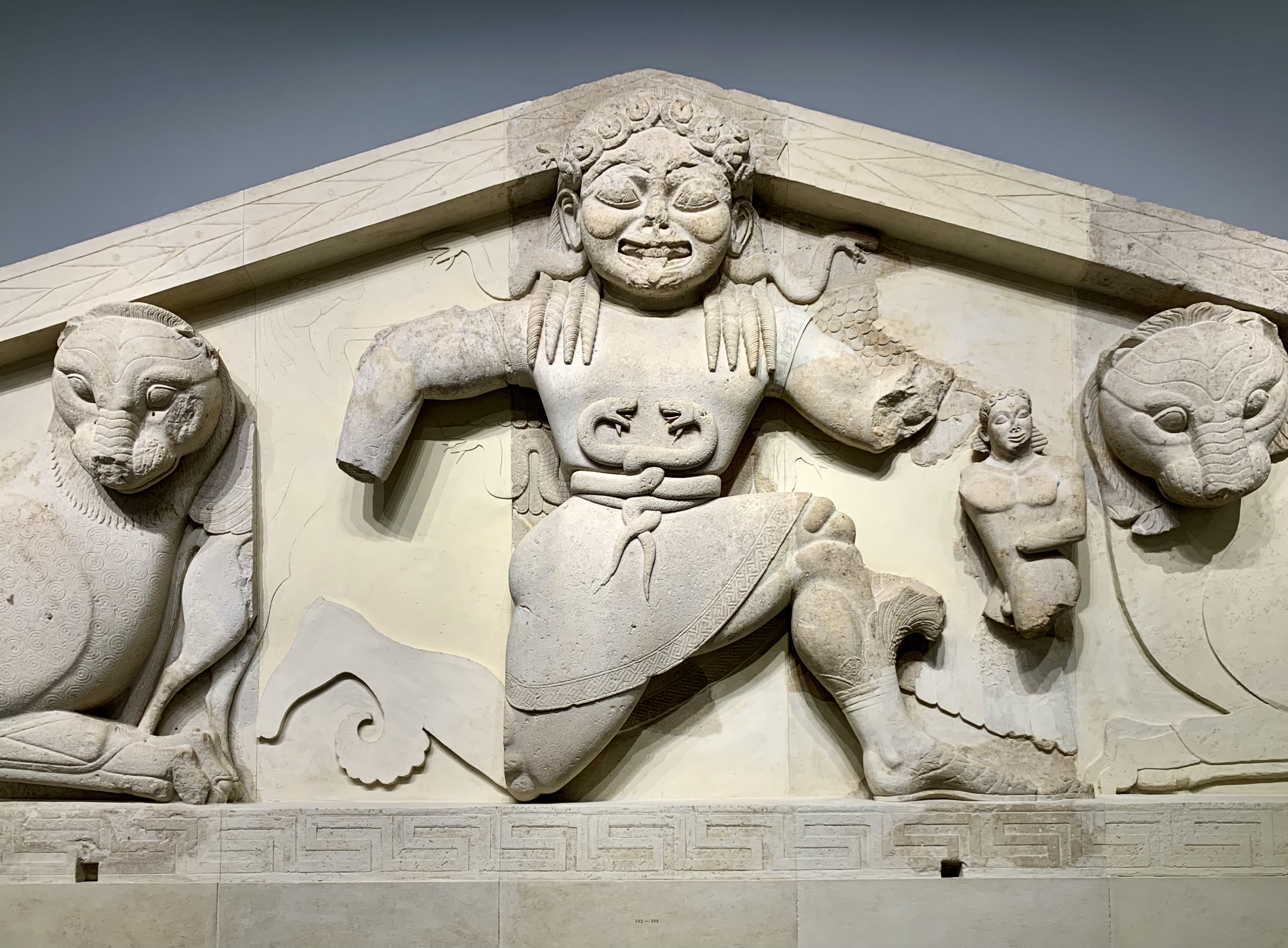
The archaic Gorgon at the pediment of the Temple of Artemis as shown at the Archaeological Museum of Corfu. She wears a belt of intertwined snakes, a fertility symbol.

The Minoan Snake Goddess brandished a serpent in either hand, perhaps evoking her role as source of wisdom, rather than her role as Mistress of the Animals (Potnia Theron), with a leopard under each arm.

Serpents figured prominently in archaic Greek myths. According to some sources, Ophion ("serpent", a.k.a. Ophioneus), ruled the world with Eurynome before the two of them were cast down by Cronus and Rhea. The oracles of the Ancient Greeks were said to have been the continuation of the tradition begun with the worship of the Egyptian cobra goddess Wadjet

Typhon, the enemy of the Olympian gods, is described as a vast grisly monster with a hundred heads and a hundred serpents issuing from his thighs, who was conquered and cast into Tartarus by Zeus, or confined beneath volcanic regions, where he is the cause of eruptions. Typhon is thus the chthonic figuration of volcanic forces. Serpent elements figure among his offspring; among his children by Echidna are Cerberus (a monstrous three-headed dog with a snake for a tail and a serpentine mane); the serpent-tailed Chimaera; the serpent-like chthonic water beast Lernaean Hydra; and the hundred-headed serpentine dragon Ladon. Both the Lernaean Hydra and Ladon were slain by Heracles.

Heracles also slew a pair of snakes, sent by Hera as a child by strangling them.

Python was the earth-dragon of Delphi. She always was represented in the vase-paintings and by sculptors as a serpent. Python was the chthonic enemy of Apollo, who slew her and remade her former home his own oracle, the most famous in Classical Greece.

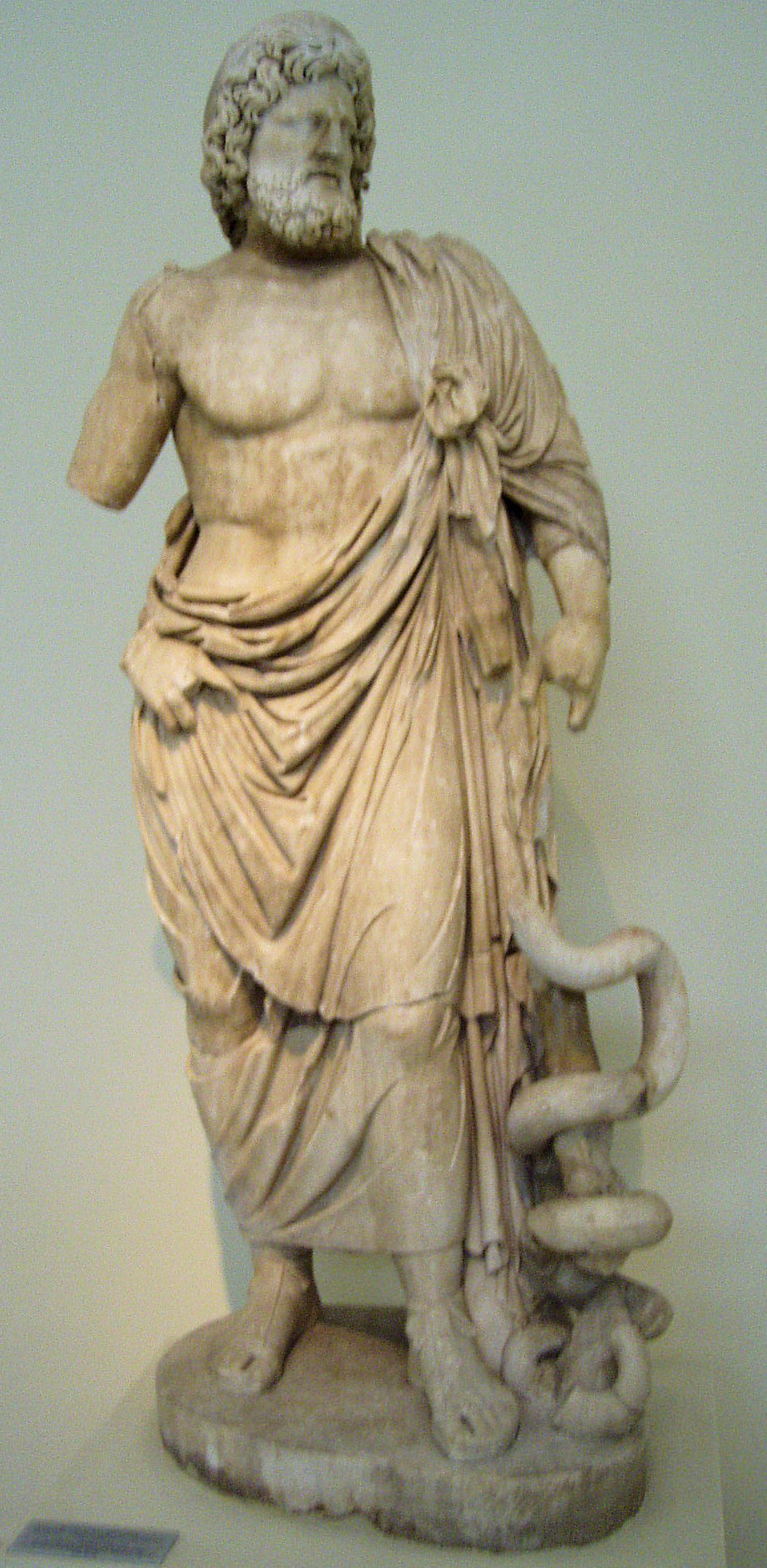
Statue of Asclepius

The Gorgons - Stheno, Euryale, and Medusa - were three monstrous sisters with sharp fangs and living, venomous snakes for hair, and whose origins predate the written myths of Greece and who were the protectors of the most ancient ritual secrets. The Gorgons wore a belt of two intertwined serpents in the same configuration of the caduceus. The Gorgon was placed at the center, highest point of one of the pediments on the Temple of Artemis at Corfu.

Asclepius, the son of Apollo and Coronis, learned the secrets of keeping death at bay after observing one serpent bringing another (which Asclepius himself had fatally wounded) back to life with healing herbs. To prevent the entire human race from becoming immortal under Asclepius's care, Zeus killed him with a bolt of lightning. Asclepius' death at the hands of Zeus illustrates man's inability to challenge the natural order that separates mortal men from the gods. In honor of Asclepius, snakes were often used in healing rituals. Non-poisonous snakes were left to crawl on the floor in dormitories where the sick and injured slept. The Bibliotheca claimed that Athena gave Asclepius a vial of blood from the Gorgons. Gorgon blood had magical properties: if taken from the left side of the Gorgon, it was a fatal poison; from the right side, the blood was capable of bringing the dead back to life. However, Euripides wrote in his tragedy Ion that the Athenian queen Creusa had inherited this vial from her ancestor Erichthonios, who was a snake himself and had received the vial from Athena. In this version the blood of Medusa had the healing power while the lethal poison originated from Medusa's serpents.

The founder of the polis of Athens, Erichthonius was believed to be half snake, half man. This symbolised him being earth-born, as snakes were associated with the earth/ground. It was also believed that a sacred, living snake lived in the Erechtheion, sacred to Athena. Behind the shield of the Athena Parthenos was a coiled snake.

Olympias, the mother of Alexander the Great and a princess of the primitive land of Epirus, had the reputation of a snake-handler, and it was in serpent form that Zeus was said to have fathered Alexander upon her. Aeëtes, the king of Colchis and father of the sorceress Medea, possessed the Golden Fleece. He guarded it with a massive serpent that never slept. Medea, who had fallen in love with Jason of the Argonauts, enchanted it to sleep so Jason could seize the Fleece. (See Lamia).

When not driven by horses, the chariot of the Greek sun god is described as being pulled by fiery draconic beings. The most notable instance of this is observed in the episode in which Medea is given her grandfather's chariot, which is pulled by serpents through the sky.

In artwork snakes are occasionally associated with Hecate, the goddess of witchcraft.

=== Hindu mythology ===
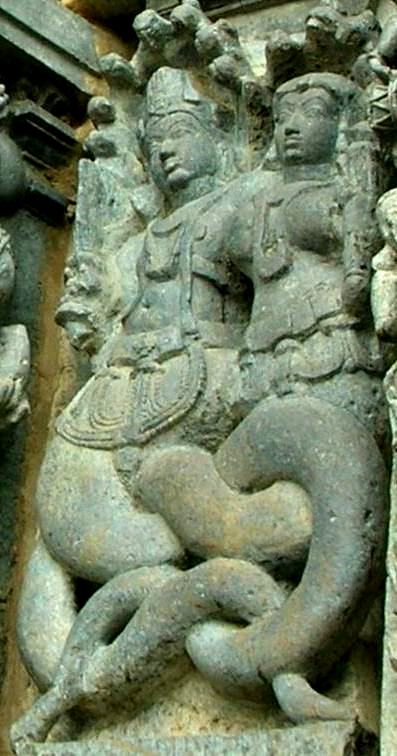
Hoysala sculpture of a Naga couple, Halebidu

Naga (Sanskrit: नाग) is the Sanskrit/Pāli word for a deity or class of entity or being, taking the form of a very large snake, found in Hinduism, Buddhism, and Jainism. The naga primarily represents rebirth, death and mortality, due to its casting of its skin and being symbolically "reborn".

Hindus associate the naga with the deities Shiva and Vishnu. Shesha is one of the two mounts of Vishnu, upon which the deity rests. Vasuki is a serpent coiled around the neck of Shiva. The snake represents freedom in Hindu mythology because they cannot be tamed. In Buddhism, the serpent Mucalinda is associated as the protector of Buddha. In Jainism, serpent is associated with the 23rd Tirthankara Parshvanatha.

=== Hindu symbolism ===
In Hindu mythology, serpents (Nāgas) are considered powerful semi-divine beings associated with water, fertility, and the underworld. Nāgas are also linked to cosmic energy (Kundalini) and feature prominently in astrology as the basis for Rahu and Ketu, the lunar nodes representing karmic influences and eclipse-causing shadow planets.

==== Nagas of Indochina ====
Serpents, or nāgas, play a particularly important role in Khmer mythology. An origin myth explains the emergence of the name "Cambodia" as resulting from conquest of a naga princess by a Kambuja lord named Kaundinya: the descendants of their union are the Khmer people. George Cœdès suggests the Cambodian myth is a basis for the Thai legend of "Phra Daeng Nang Ai", in which a woman who has lived many previous lives in the region is reincarnated as a daughter of Phraya Khom (Thai for Cambodian) and causes the death of her companion in former lives who has been reincarnated as a prince of the Nagas. This leads to war between the "spirits of the air" and the Nagas: Nagas amok are rivers in spate, and the entire region is flooded. The Myth of the Toad King tells how introduction of Buddhist teachings led to war with the sky deity Phaya Thaen, and ended in a truce with nagas posted as guardians of entrances to temples.

=== Native American mythology ===
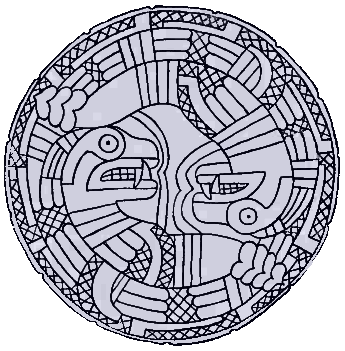
Ancient North American serpent imagery often featured rattlesnakes.

Some Native American tribes give reverence to the rattlesnake as grandfather and king of snakes who is able to give fair winds or cause tempest. Among the Hopi of Arizona the serpent figures largely in one of the dances. The rattlesnake was worshiped in the Natchez Temple of the Sun, and the Aztec deity Quetzalcoatl was a feathered serpent-god. In many Meso-American cultures, the serpent was regarded as a portal between two worlds. The tribes of Peru are said to have adored great snakes in the pre-Inca days, and in Chile the Mapuche made a serpent figure in their deluge beliefs.

A Horned Serpent is a popular image in Northern American natives' mythology.

In one Native North American story, an evil serpent kills one of the gods' cousins, so the god kills the serpent in revenge, but the dying serpent unleashes a great flood. People first flee to the mountains and then, when the mountains are covered, they float on a raft until the flood subsides. The evil spirits that the serpent god controlled then hide out of fear. The Mound Builders associated great mystical value to the serpent, as the Serpent Mound demonstrates, though we are unable to unravel the particular associations.

=== Nordic mythology ===
Jörmungandr, alternately referred to as the Midgard Serpent or World Serpent, is a sea serpent of Norse mythology, the middle child of Loki and the giantess Angrboða. According to the Prose Edda, Odin took Loki's three children, Fenrisúlfr, Hel and Jörmungandr. He tossed Jörmungandr into the great ocean that encircles Midgard. The serpent grew so big that he was able to surround the Earth and grasp his own tail, and as a result he earned the alternate name of the Midgard Serpent or World Serpent. Jörmungandr's arch enemy is the god Thor.

In the Poetic Edda, Odin tells of eight serpents gnawing on the roots of Yggdrasil: Nidhöggr, Gravvitnir, Moin, Goin, Grábakr, Grafvölluðr, Svafnir and Ofnir.

== Folklore ==
In folk and fairy tale traditions all over the world, the serpent and the snake appear as characters in several fairy tales, either a main character in animal fables and magic tales (Märchen), or as the donor who grants the protagonist a special ability or impart him with some secret knowledge.

According to the Aarne-Thompson-Uther Index, the serpent can appear in this capacity in the following tale types:

- Aarne-Thompson-Uther Index tale type ATU 155, "The Ungrateful Animal (Serpent) Returned to Captivity": a farmer rescues an animal (snake) from a trap (pit). Now free, the animal wants to eat (bite) its saviour, who tries to delay this fate. He consults with other creatures and finally to a trickster animal (fox or jackal). The trickster animal feigns innocence and wants to understand the origin of the problem, so the ungrateful animal goes back to the pit to demonstrate. The farmer leaves the animal trapped again. Example: The Tiger, the Brahmin and the Jackal, Indian fable.
- Aarne-Thompson-Uther Index tale type ATU 411, "The King and the Lamia (The Snake-Wife)": a man takes to wife a woman of mysterious background. A holy person (hermit, cleric, monk) sees through the deception and reveals the woman's true nature as a serpent. This type would include Legend of the White Snake (Chinese legend); Mélusine, a French medieval legend.
- Aarne-Thompson-Uther Index tale type ATU 425, "The Search for the Lost Husband", and subtypes: a maiden is betrothed to an animal bridegroom (a snake, dragon or serpent, in several variants), who comes at night to the bridal bed in human form. The maiden breaks a taboo and her enchanted husband disappears. She is forced to seek him. Example: The Green Serpent, French literary fairy tale; The Enchanted Snake, Italian literary fairy tale; The Serpent Prince, Hungarian folktale; Princess Himal and Nagaray, Kashmiri folktale; The Snake Prince, The Story of Hira and Lal, and The Story of Halahal Kumar, Indian folktales.
- Aarne-Thompson-Uther Index tale type ATU 425M, "The Snake as Bridegroom": a girl goes bathing and leaves her clothing by the shore. When she returns, a snake (grass snake) hides her clothing and will only return them if the girl agrees to marry it. She promises to marry the snake. Some time later, the grass snake comes to take its bride and bring her to its underwater (or underground) palace. This tale type seems to be restricted to the Baltic geographical area. Example: Egle the Queen of Serpents, a Lithuanian fairy tale.
- Aarne-Thompson-Uther Index tale type ATU 433B, "King Lindworm": a childless queen gives birth to a boy in snake form. Years later, he wishes to marry, but either devours his brides on their wedding night or cannot find a woman brave enough to accept his serpentine form. The snake prince is disenchanted by a maiden who wears layers of clothing in their nuptial night to mirror his layers of snakeskin. Example: King Lindworm, a Danish fairy tale; The Dragon-Prince and the Stepmother and The Stepdaughter and the Black Serpent, Turkish fairy tales.
- Aarne-Thompson-Uther Index tale type ATU 485, "Borma Jarizhka" or "The City of Babylon": a tsar sends a brave knight to the city of Babylon to retrieve three symbols of royal power (a robe, a crown, a scepter). The city is surrounded by snakes and ruled by a princess with snake-like attributes.
- Aarne-Thompson-Uther Index tale type ATU 560, "The Magic Ring": a poor man either buys or rescues four types of animals, a cat, a dog, a mouse and a snake. This snake is the son of the king of serpents. It takes the boy to its father's court to reward him a wish-granting object (usually a magic stone or ring). Example: The Enchanted Watch, French fairy tale.
- Aarne-Thompson-Uther Index tale type ATU 612, "The Three Snake-Leaves": a man kills a snake. Its mate brings three magical leaves to resurrect it. This inspires the man to find a similar herb to use on his deceased bride/wife.
- Aarne-Thompson-Uther Index tale type ATU 672, "The Serpent's Crown": a snake takes off its crown to bathe in the lake. The crown is stolen by a human, who discovers the crown can grant special abilities (most often, the knowledge of animal languages).
- Aarne-Thompson-Uther Index tale type ATU 673, "The White Serpent's Flesh": the main character learns the language of animals by eating the flesh of a white serpent. Example: The White Snake, German fairy tale by the Brothers Grimm.

== Flags and heraldry ==
Serpents or snakes appear on the flags or coats of arms of several entities.

The Flag of Mexico, based on the Aztec symbol for Tenochtitlan, depicts an eagle sitting on a cactus while devouring a serpent

The arms of the House of Visconti, who ruled the Duchy of Milan

The municipal coat of arms of Kyyjärvi, Finland

=== American Revolution ===
In 1754 and again during the American Revolution, Benjamin Franklin published the Join, or Die. cartoon in The Pennsylvania Gazette to give a message of colonial unity. The cartoon shows a snake in eight pieces, each representing one or more of the Thirteen Colonies. It was based on a superstition that if a snake was cut in pieces and the pieces were put together before sunset, the snake would return to life.

Following the publication of "Join, or Die", the rattlesnake became a symbol of the Thirteen Colonies. Franklin and other colonists considered the rattlesnake to represent independence and vigilance. Several flags of the American Revolution depict rattlesnakes. Two of the more notable flags with the rattlesnake imagery are the Gadsden flag and the First Navy Jack. The United States War Office, and its successor organizations the Department of War and Department of the Army, contain a rattlesnake in their emblems.

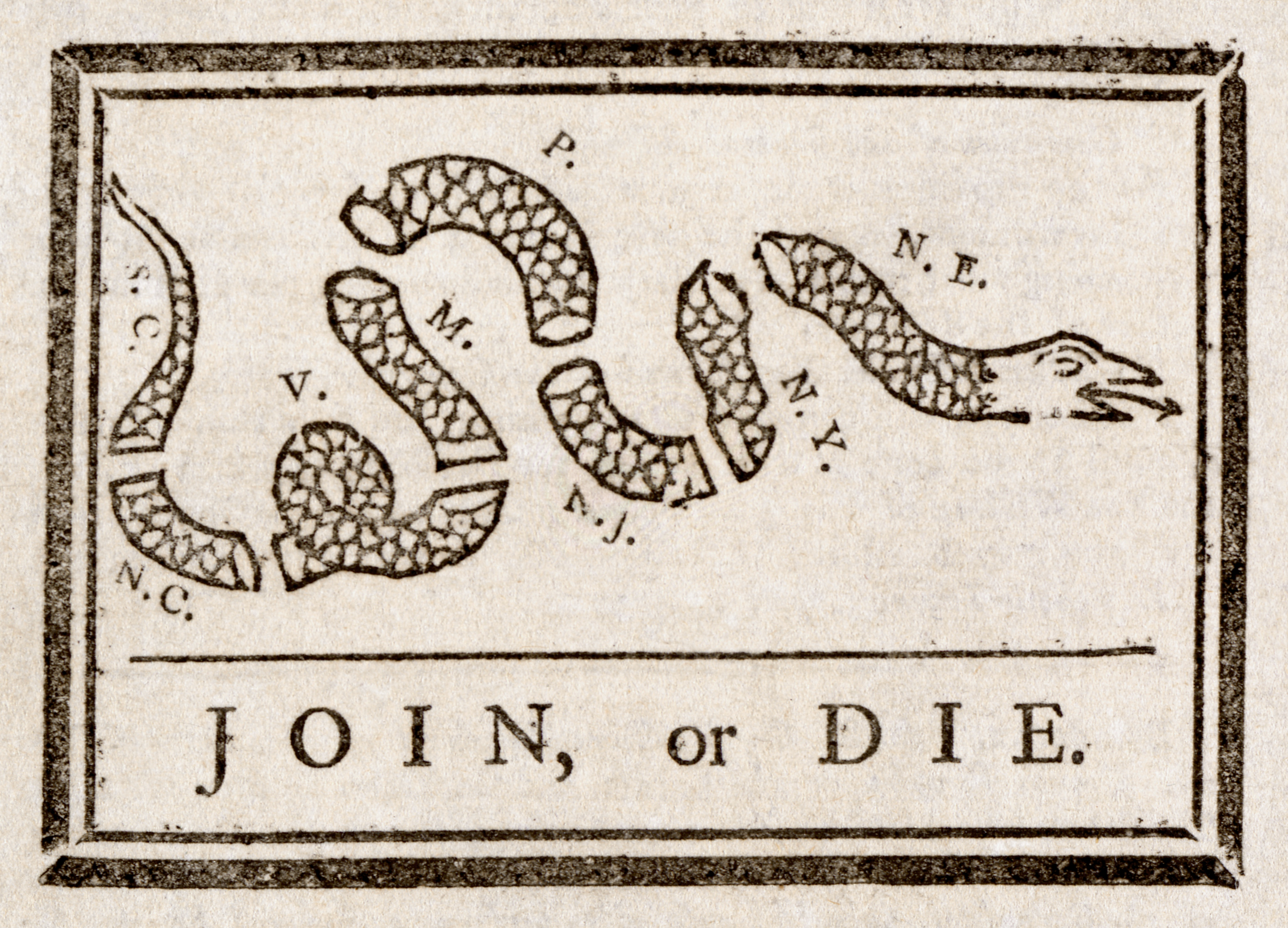
Join, or Die. a 1754 political cartoon by Benjamin Franklin

A rattlesnake appears on the Gadsden flag

A rattlesnake appears on the First Navy Jack of the United States

The Department of the Army Emblem contains a rattlesnake with the motto "this we'll defend"

== Modern symbolism ==
=== Modern medicine ===
The Star of Life features a Rod of Asclepius.

Snakes entwined the staffs both of Hermes (the caduceus) and of Asclepius, where a single snake entwined the rough staff. On Hermes' caduceus, the snakes were not merely duplicated for symmetry, they were paired opposites. (This motif is congruent with the phurba.) The wings at the head of the staff identified it as belonging to the winged messenger Hermes, the Roman Mercury, who was the god of magic, diplomacy and rhetoric, of inventions and discoveries, and the protector both of merchants and that allied occupation, to the mythographers' view, of thieves. It is however Hermes' role as psychopomp, the escort of newly deceased souls to the afterlife, that explains the origin of the snakes in the caduceus, since this was also the role of the Sumerian entwined serpent god Ningizzida, with whom Hermes has sometimes been equated.

In Late Antiquity, as the arcane study of alchemy developed, Mercury was understood to be the protector of those arts too and of arcane or occult "Hermetic" information in general. Chemistry and medicines linked the rod of Hermes with the staff of the healer Asclepius, which was wound with a serpent; it was conflated with Mercury's rod, and the modern medical symbol—which should simply be the rod of Asclepius—often became Mercury's wand of commerce. Another version is used in alchemy where the snake is crucified, known as Nicolas Flamel's caduceus. Art historian Walter J. Friedlander, in The Golden Wand of Medicine: A History of the Caduceus Symbol in Medicine (1992), collected hundreds of examples of the caduceus and the rod of Asclepius and found that professional associations were just somewhat more likely to use the staff of Asclepius, while commercial organizations in the medical field were more likely to use the caduceus.

=== Modern political propaganda ===
Following the Christian context as a symbol for evil, serpents are sometimes featured in political propaganda. They were used to represent Jews in antisemitic propaganda. Snakes were also used to represent the evil side of drugs in such films as Narcotic and Narcotics: Pit of Despair. The Gadsden flag of the American Revolution continues to be used in modern political propaganda to connote libertarianism and anti-government sentiments.

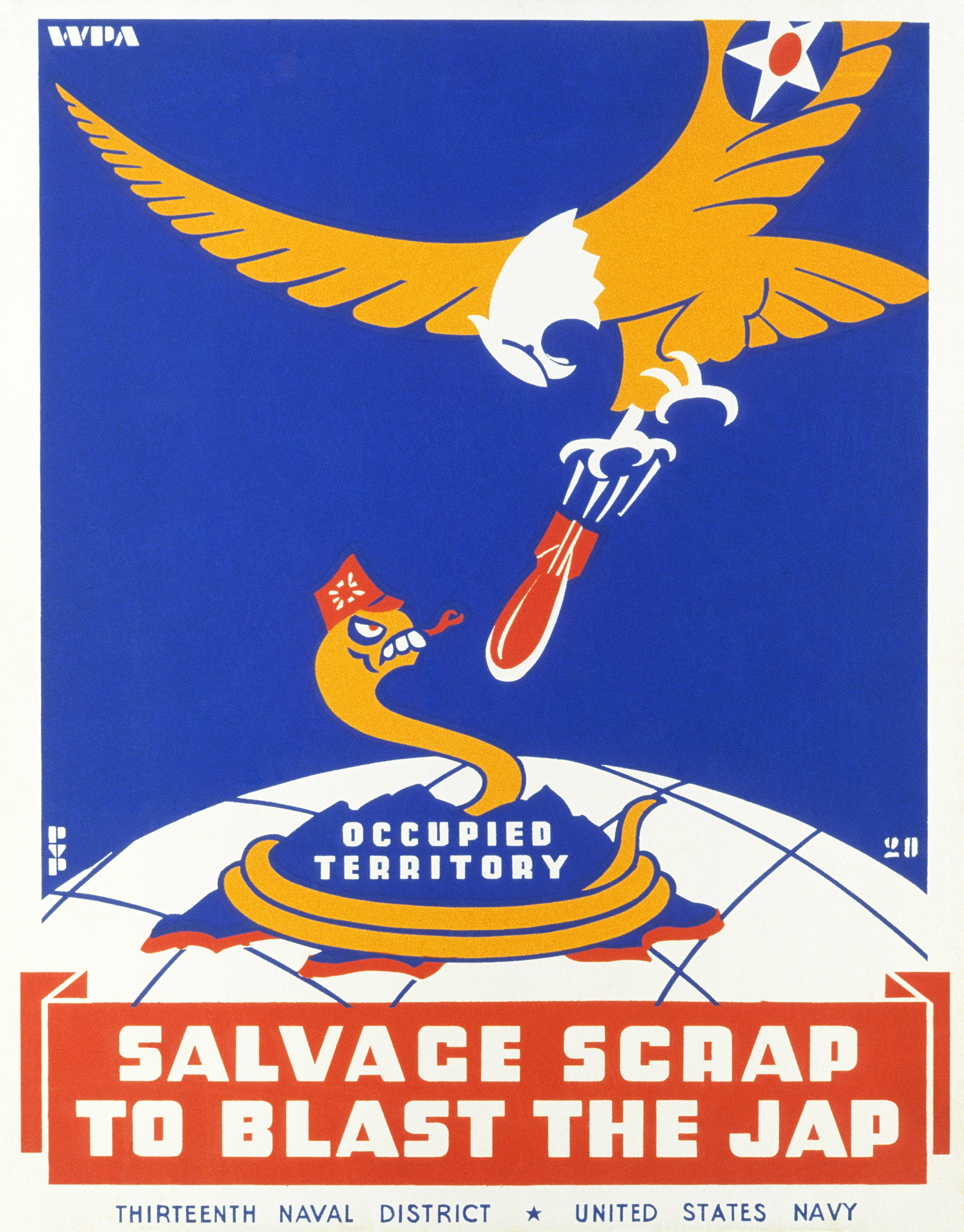
Imperial Japan depicted as an evil snake in a WWII propaganda poster

=== Automobiles ===
The automobile brands AC Cobra, Ford Mustang Shelby, Zarooq Motors, Dodge Viper, and Alfa Romeo all feature snakes on their logos.

== See also ==
- Adder stone
- Ethnoherpetology
- Glycon
- Legend of the White Snake
- Nehushtan
- Serpent Column
- Snake (zodiac)
- Snakes in Chinese mythology
- L'Évangile du serpent
- Snake detection theory, hypothesis in evolutionary biology suggesting that predation from snakes contributed to the evolution of visual systems in humans and other primates
