= Lac des Salhiens =

Lake in Lozère, France

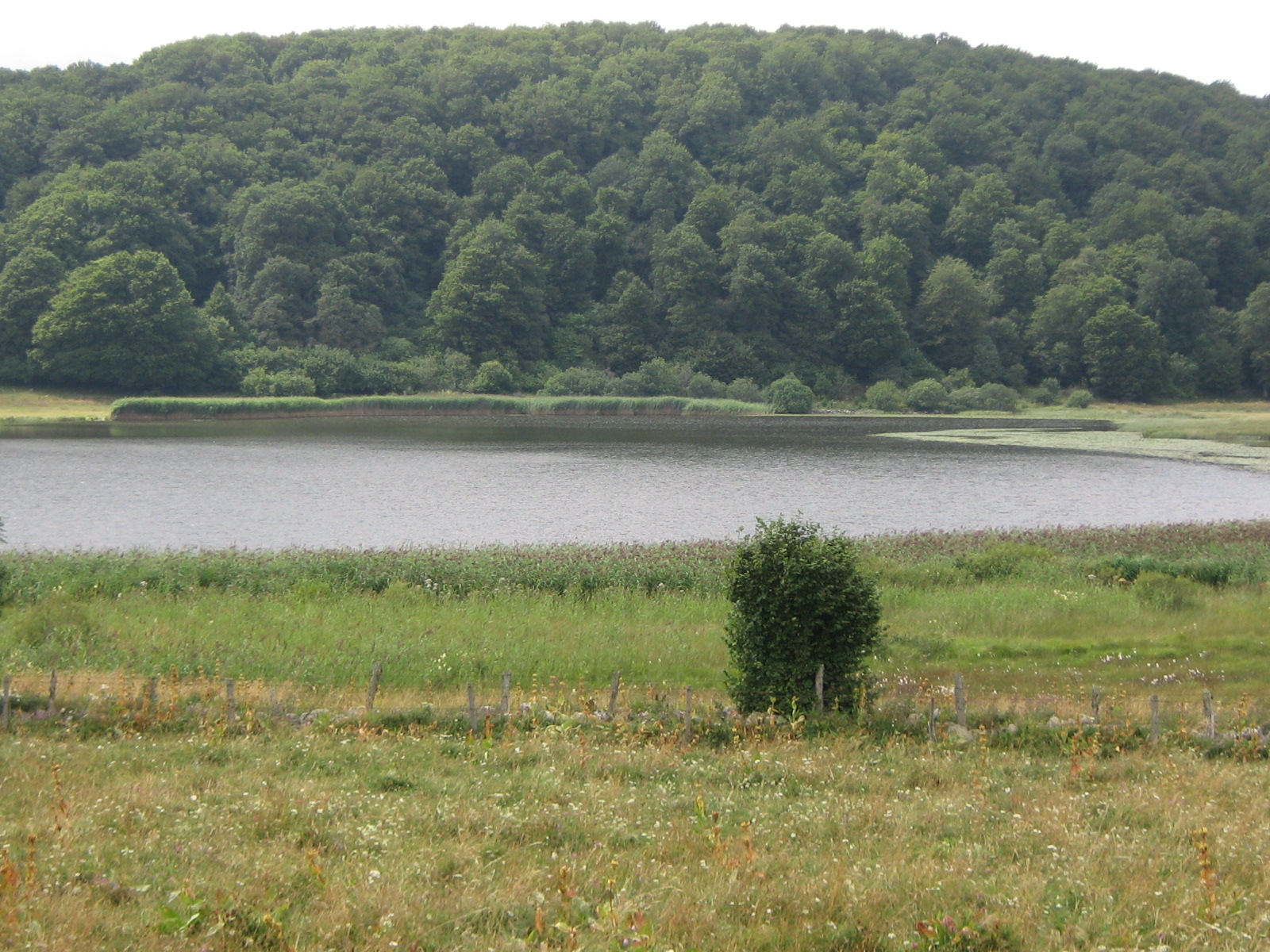

- Location within France
- Location: Lozère
- Coordinates: 44°38′36″N 03°03′39″E
- Basin countries: France
- Surface area: 0.06 km^{2} (0.023 sq mi)
- Max. depth: 15 m (49 ft)
- Surface elevation: 1,210 m (3,970 ft)
- Islands: none

Lac des Salhiens is a lake located in Lozère, France, on the Aubrac plateau. It has a glacial origin like the other lakes located in this area (St Andéol, Souveyrols, Born). Its surface area is 0.06 km^{2}.
