= L'Évangile du serpent =

Book by Pierre Bordage

L’Évangile du serpent
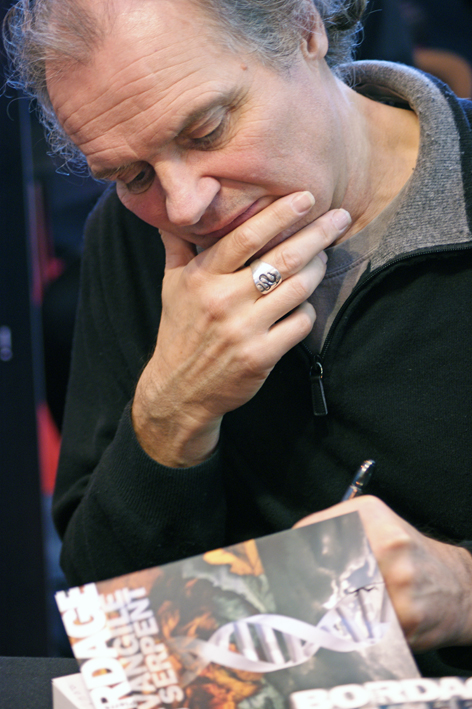
- Pierre Bordage signing copies of his book at the Paris Book Fair in 2011.
- Author: Pierre Bordage
- Genre: Novel
- Publisher: Au Diable Vauvert
- Publication date: 2001
- Publication place: France
- Pages: 560
- ISBN: 2846260141

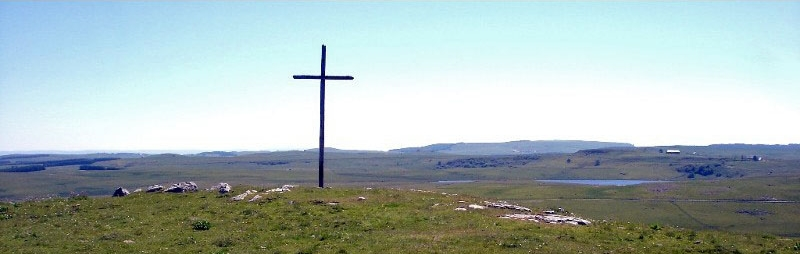
Christian cross on the plateau of Aubrac.

L'Évangile du serpent (English: The Gospel of the Serpent) is a thriller written by Pierre Bordage, published by Au Diable Vauvert in 2001. A modern reinterpretation of the Gospels, it tells the story of Vaï Ka’i, a prophet with healing powers, through the accounts of four people who cross his path: Mathias, Marc, Lucie, and Yann. Vaï Ka’i endangers the Western life model and becomes “the man to bring down” for French political, religious, and financial leaders.

L'Évangile du serpent is Pierre Bordage’s first novel outside the science fiction genre. It develops themes of spirituality opposed to religion and nomadism, using the symbolism of the serpent as a backdrop. The author expresses his affinity for shamanism and non-religious spirituality in this book. He adopts a unique narrative structure, with four main characters whose actions are recounted in turn. The book received a very mixed critical reception, particularly due to its portrayal of Western civilization. It was awarded the Bob Morane Prize for Best French-Language Novel in 2002.

== Summary ==
Four people who do not know each other recount the rise of Jesus, an Amazonian child adopted in Lozère. This miraculous healer becomes Vaï Ka’i, the “master-spirit,” who gathers more followers. Mathias is a hitman, Lucie earns a living as an internet stripper, Marc the journalist is paid to write a vulgar article about Vaï Ka’i and his adoptive family, and the intellectual Yann is the first disciple of the “master-spirit.” In contact with Vaï Ka’i, all four see their lives transformed, encounter love, change their perspective on society, and regain self-esteem. Vaï Ka’i brings more and more people along the path of returning to the Earth’s natural rhythm, advocating the abandonment of material attachments and neonomadism. He threatened Western society and became “the man to bring down” for French political, religious, and financial leaders. They organize his public lynching on a popular talk show, where the “Christ of Aubrac” responds to no aggression, assures everyone of his love, and foretells his imminent death. Vaï Ka’i is killed in the studio corridors by Mathias, a victim of impulses from a microchip implanted by the French secret services.

== History and publication ==
According to Roland Ernould, Pierre Bordage had long been tempted to write a story inspired by the Bible. It is the first volume of the Prophecies trilogy, but the three works are relatively independent, with different characters. (Note: Université Bordeaux Montaigne, 1:45 - 1:55 min) L'Évangile du serpent was first published in June 2001 (its legal deposit date) in large format by the publisher Au Diable Vauvert. The cover features two intertwined serpents with a head at each end of the body, to the left of the book's title.

- Bordage, Pierre (2001). L'Évangile du Serpent. Vauvert: Au diable vauvert. ISBN 2-84626-014-1.

It was republished by France Loisirs the following year, with a cover by Jean Vanriet.

- Bordage, Pierre (2002). L'Évangile du Serpent. Paris: France Loisirs. ISBN 2-7441-5252-8.

In 2005, L'Évangile du serpent was reprinted for a three-volume box set containing the other two parts of the Prophecies trilogy, L'Ange de l'abîme (volume 2) and Les Chemins de Damas (volume 3). For this edition, the first edition cover was revised in accordance with Le Diable Vauvert’s new graphic design.

In paperback, the book was published by Folio (Gallimard) in April 2003, with a cover illustrated by Matt Lamb. It was reissued in April 2007 with the same cover.

- Bordage, Pierre (2003). L'Évangile du Serpent. Paris: Folio. ISBN 2-07-042352-2.

== Characters ==
The novel tells four parallel stories lived by four characters—Mathias, Marc, Lucie, and Yann—evoking the four evangelists of the Bible. They are, in a sense, the apostles of Vaï Ka’i. (Note: Université Bordeaux Montaigne, 8:00 - 8:04 min) All are marginalized or in a state of sin at the beginning of the book, literally “crushed by the system,” estranged from their true selves. They are not heroes in the classical sense, being solitary and in pain. (Note: Université Bordeaux Montaigne, 8:33 - 9:00 min)

According to Pascal Patoz, these characters “illustrate the principle that the last shall be first.” The book structure is such that each character returns in turn every four chapters, until the end. At the start of the book, they do not know each other and are dealing with existential problems, but their respective paths toward spirituality lead them to evolve and aim toward the same goal, “as if they were connected by an invisible thread.” They converge toward Vaï Ka’i, whom they each meet at some point. Each experiences a revelation of self. At the final meeting, they feel their connection to one another as self-evident. (Note: Université Bordeaux Montaigne, 15 - 15:35 min) Another important character in the novel is Pierrette, Vaï Ka’i’s adoptive sister. She is the equivalent of Mary in the Bible.

According to Olivier Girard, the author shows great empathy and occasionally striking sensitivity, but his characters are “transparent and too obviously constructed.” Conversely, Arsenik of the Biblioblog believes that “the characters’ psychology is very developed,” making them relatable.

=== Vaï Ka’i ===
Translation of an excerpt from a dialogue of Vaï Ka'i, p. 294

The Christian view of existence is not the view of Christ. The Christian view of existence is that of Paul, that of Rome, that of the popes, the missionaries, the fanatics, the conquerors, the builders. (Note: Bordage 2007, p. 294)

Nicknamed “the Christ of Aubrac,” Vaï Ka’i is an Indigenous man born in the Amazon, in Colombia. His name means “master-spirit” in the Desana language. The shamans of his tribe foresaw the birth of a new messiah among them, but they were massacred by the macheteros of logging companies, at the instigation of the Colombian Church, which feared the arrival of a rival. Vaï Ka’i survived only thanks to a French missionary priest, Father Simon. (Note: Bordage 2007, p. 174) Back in France, the priest entrusted the child to his sister in Lozère, who named him Jesus. At the age of ten, Vaï Ka’i performed his first miracles through his healing powers. He is an ecologist who preaches the abandonment of material possessions and a return to nomadism. His teaching is based on the “wisdom of the double serpent, a shamanic symbol of DNA,” (Note: Bordage 2007, p. 560) and on access to universal knowledge through the “house of all laws,” a web where man and the universe are in harmony. When his miraculous healings and teachings become known, particularly on the internet, he is invited to a popular talk show where all the guests (a clergyman, a psychologist, a scientist...) provoke him. He listens without replying (which works in his favor, as his opponents, finding no way to attack him, end up arguing among themselves and discrediting themselves), assures them of his love, and predicts his imminent death. The hitman Mathias assassinates him shortly after the show. Three days of storms follow his death, and he “reappears” to thousands of people who give similar testimonies. (Note: Bordage 2007, p. 551) Vaï Ka’i’s healings are not explained; the novel is built on the testimonies of those who meet him. However, they can be considered real insofar as they lead to characters’ transformations. (Note: Université Bordeaux Montaigne, 15:40 - 17 min)

Vaï-Ka’i is presented to the reader as a true messiah. The book leaves no doubt about this, nor about his mission. According to Pascal Patoz, “this certainty is what makes the novel so compelling, because it would be too easy to see the character as a mere charlatan.” However, he regrets that Vaï-Ka’i never explains why he proposes this life model. Likewise, Vaï-Ka’i refuses to be treated as a prophet and accepts the inevitability of his death so that people may find the answers within themselves. (Note: Université Bordeaux Montaigne, 17:50 - 18:30 min)

=== Mathias ===
A professional killer of Russian origin, blond with a very handsome face, Mathias is trapped and captured by the French secret services during a contract. They force him to work for them and infiltrate a group of Islamist terrorists. He thus plays a role in the execution of an attack at Disneyland Paris, the goal of this tragedy being both to harm American interests in Europe and to direct popular anger against Muslims. He is the last person to meet the Christ of Aubrac. He kills him against his will, as his employers had secretly implanted a chip in his brain to control his movements. According to Roland Ernould and Claire Cornillon, Mathias represents Judas in the Gospels, (Note: Université Bordeaux Montaigne, 8:05 - 8:04 min) and Ernould also sees in him an evocation of Matthew.

=== Marc ===
A fifty-year-old journalist without ambition or ethics, Marc works for EDV, a powerful media group whose orders he follows without question. His boss first sends him to investigate and then write an article about the Christ of Aubrac with the sole purpose of harming him, under pressure from lobbying groups. Marc writes a first article to attack Vaï-Ka’i and his adoptive mother, then he turns against his boss, realizes that his mistress and his ex are taking advantage of him, and reforms himself, losing all his material possessions but regaining happiness. At the end of the story, he admits he once betrayed Pierrette, Vaï-Ka’i’s adoptive sister. (Note: Bordage 2007, p. 545) According to Roland Ernould, Marc represents the Pharisee in the service of the temple merchants.

=== Lucie ===
She is a webcam stripper, fulfilling men’s fantasies by reducing herself to the role of a sex object. First a victim of rape, then of a narcissistic pervert who manipulates her into falling in love with him, she ends up attending a lecture by Vaï-Ka’i. Beaten to death by rioters, she is resurrected by him. This miracle also reveals the monstrosity of her “friend,” but she later redeems him through her love. According to Roland Ernould, she represents Mary Magdalene.

=== Yann ===
Assistant and first disciple of Vaï-Ka’i, he is an intellectual and a former student of Sciences Po. He is simply “available” at that moment, eager to supervise, manage, and plan the career and movements of the Christ of Aubrac. At the beginning of the book, he appears manipulative and interested in political advancement, but evolves as he comes to understand the meaning of Vaï-Ka’i’s message. According to Roland Ernould, he represents both Saint John and Saint Peter.

== Analysis ==
This novel is hard to categorize. Some critics consider that it does not belong to the science fiction genre typically associated with Pierre Bordage, while others describe it as a speculative thriller. L'Évangile du serpent nonetheless marks the author’s entry into general literature, while revisiting a theme dear to him: the reinterpretation of ancient myths. This novel can be compared to Abzalon, which takes the form of a Genesis story on a planetary scale. However, it takes place entirely in a world heavily inspired by our own. (Note: Université Bordeaux Montaigne, 3:30 - 3:45 min)

The author tells the story of the arrival of a true messiah in early 21st-century society and the changes and questioning it provokes. One finds, in particular, four evangelists, miraculous healings, and Vaï-Ka’i walking toward his death in love, forgiveness, and peace. Pierre Bordage shows a sensitivity to anthropology and depth psychology (the concept of the collective unconscious), though he does not explore this subject in depth in his book.

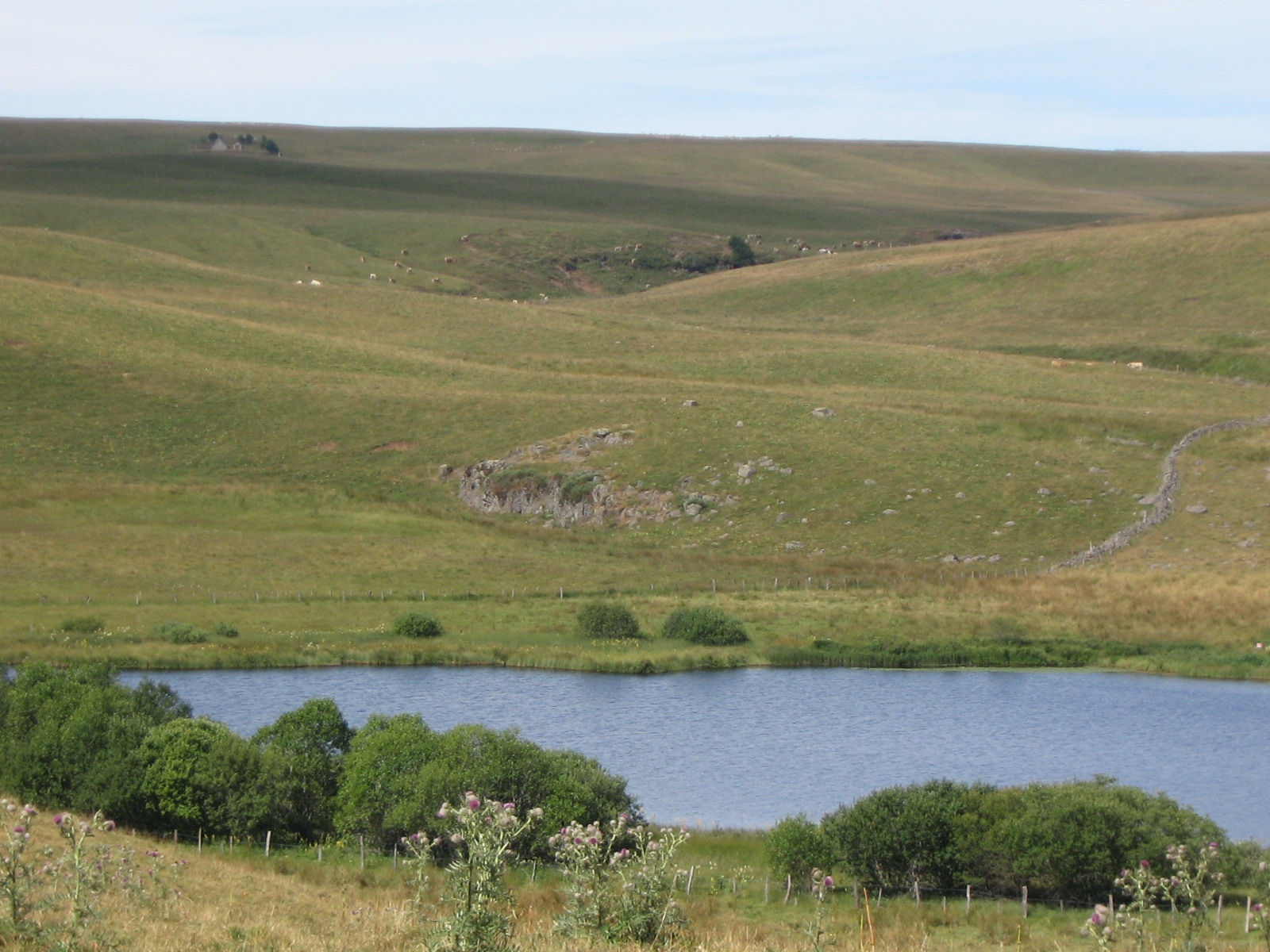
Typical landscape of the Aubrac region near Souveyrols lake.

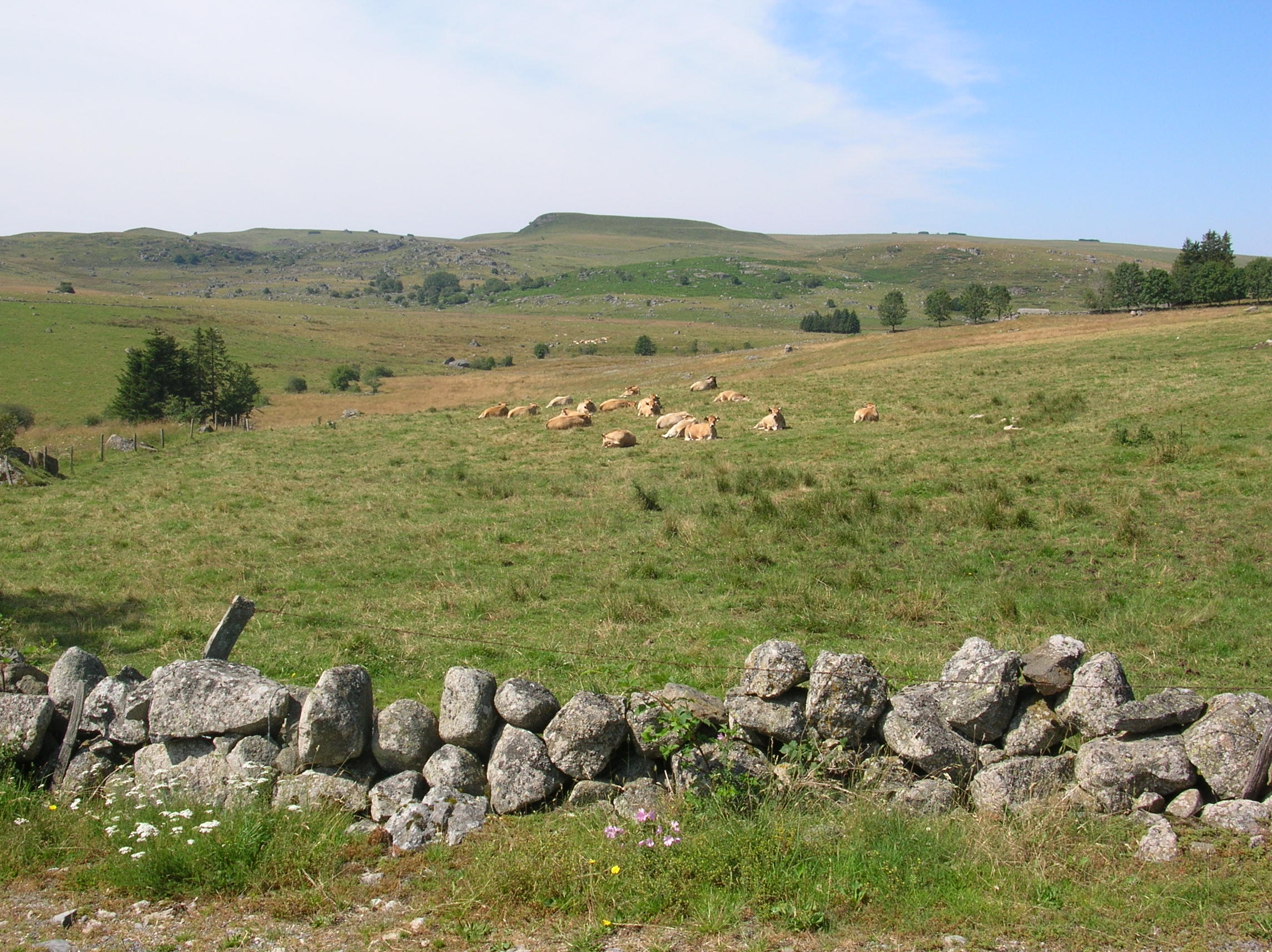
View of the northern Aubrac region.

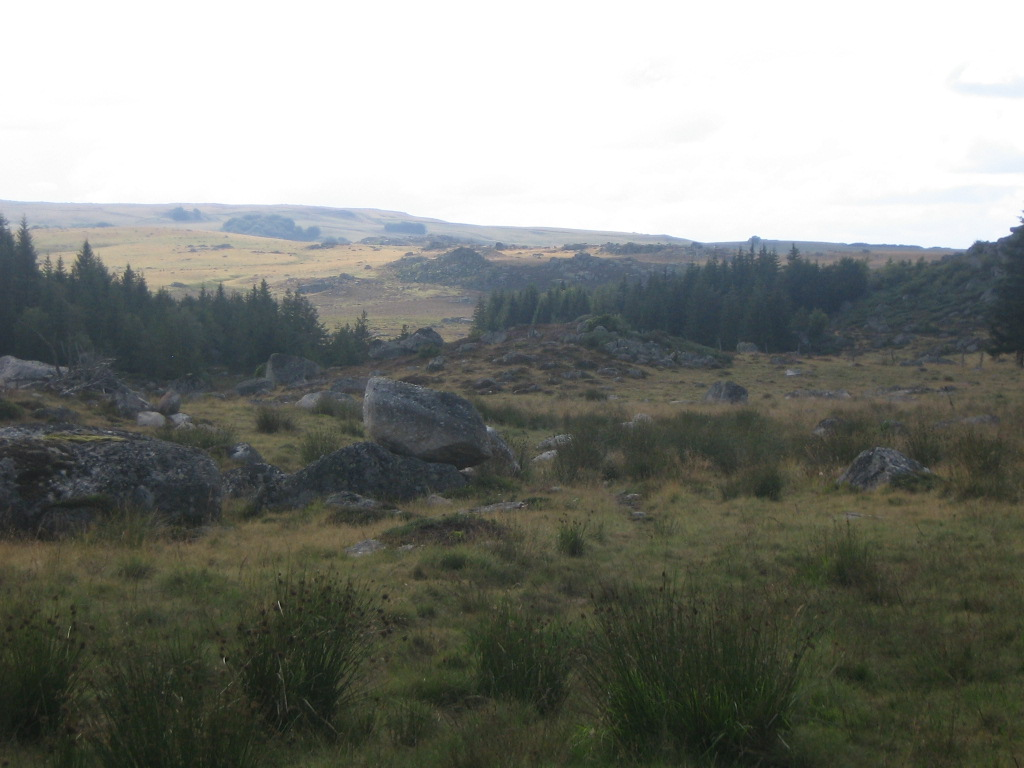
View of the Aubrac region near the Col de Bonnecombe mountain pass.

=== Narration and structure ===
The novel is written entirely in the third person, (Note: Université Bordeaux Montaigne, 5:45 - 5:50 min) except for the final chapter, which switches to the first person. (Note: Université Bordeaux Montaigne, 7:10 - 7:18 min) It uses a narrative structure also found in Étoiles mourantes, a science fiction novel by Ayerdhal and Jean-Claude Dunyach, in which the characters introduced throughout the story converge at a certain point to resolve the action. (Note: Université Bordeaux Montaigne, 14 - 14:23 min) According to Pascal Patoz, the initial premise of L’Évangile du Serpent—how a true messiah would be received in the 21st century—is entirely fascinating. Michel Grisolia praises the treatment of the four characters, which gives the book “its ironic-lyrical music and frenzied rhythm.” Pascal Patoz agrees, saying that Bordage immerses us, through his interwoven narratives, in “a whirlwind of adventures where the action is sustained and the violence unfiltered.” This creates a kind of polyphony among the characters, allowing exploration of diverse points of view. (Note: Université Bordeaux Montaigne, 4:15 - 4:28 min) Each character is presented at the beginning of a chapter with a title bearing their name and a number. The last two chapters, following the convergence of the four characters, are titled “Acts 1” and “Acts 2.” (Note: Université Bordeaux Montaigne, 5:50 - 6:20 min) The status of the characters as evangelists, according to the Bible’s definition, is only justified in the final pages. (Note: Université Bordeaux Montaigne, 6:20 - 6:50 min) Marc, the journalist, says he has finally decided to write a book about the life of Vaï-Ka’i, which may be either L'Évangile du serpent itself or a book left to the reader’s imagination. (Note: Université Bordeaux Montaigne, 7:20 - 7:40 min)

According to Olivier Girard, the narrative nevertheless contains many clichés, and Vaï-Ka’i’s discourse proves too conventional. Philippe Cesse shares this view, citing a lack of originality. However, the narration is extremely well controlled, with the author confidently handling the four intersecting storylines. L'Évangile du serpent even represents a “model of the genre,” with the characters’ stories and plots coming together at the end. This facilitates the reader’s identification with one of the four protagonists. Philippe Cesse praises a “remarkable sense of description” and a “true writer,” but believes the narrative loses strength due to numerous digressions and anecdotal passages that dilute the central message. Some dialogues are deliberately “raw or vulgar,” in keeping with certain characters.

=== Themes ===
The novel themes are classic for Pierre Bordage and recall his previous science fiction works. They include the rejection of dogma and certainties, mysticism, and openness to the Other without judgment. For Olivier Girard and Cid Vicious, this novel confirms the author’s inclination toward “New Age” spirituality, but Michel Grisolia believes L'Évangile du serpent goes far beyond that framework. Pierre Bordage expresses his convictions, something rare for him, occasionally becoming somewhat moralistic. The underlying message is favorable to shamanism and Buddhism, likely sincere with his ideas as a writer. As is his habit, this novel offers an “experience of the present” in opposition to religious dogmas. (Note: Université Bordeaux Montaigne, 19:00 - 20:00 min)

According to the analysis by the journal Mutations, Bordage presents a utopian vision of a plausible world. The book contains many adages and words of wisdom, inviting the reader to reflect. The novel contrasts fragmentation with unity (the unity between man and the world promoted by Vaï Ka’i), which is also Pierre Bordage’s view of spirituality. The characters do not merely draw closer to the “Christ of Aubrac”; they also form connections with one another. (Note: Université Bordeaux Montaigne, 10:47 - 14 min)

==== End of the world ====
Within the Trilogy of the Prophecies, L'Évangile du serpent is “the announcement of the end,” of the coming chaos depicted in the following volume, L'Ange de l'abîme. (Note: Université Bordeaux Montaigne, 1:55 - 2:05 min) It also presents a possible utopian world. (Note: Université Bordeaux Montaigne, 17:30 - 17:44 min) The entire novel is marked by the presence of a (fictional) rap song, Fin d’immonde, by the group Taj Ma Rage, which serves as a backdrop, evoking the deviance of society. An apocalyptic atmosphere pervades the entire work, starting from the beginning, when the killer Mathias says he senses a prelude to the extinction of all life on Earth. (Note: Université Bordeaux Montaigne, 9:33 - 10:34 min)

==== Shamanism ====
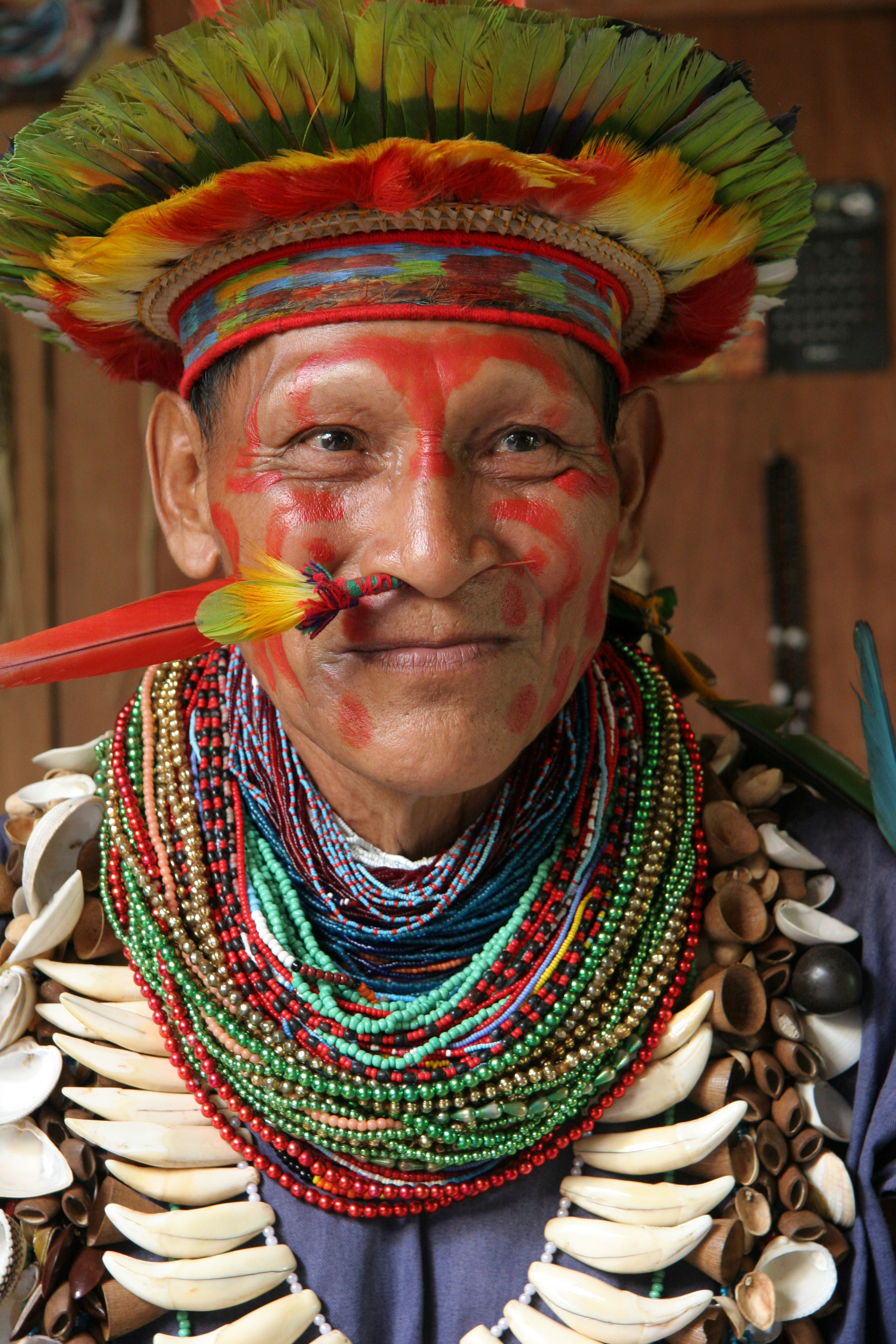
Pierre Bordage discusses Amazonian shamanism in his book.

The title L'Évangile du serpent and the descriptions of Vaï Ka’i’s practices directly reference shamanism and the symbolism of the serpent, likely inspired by Jeremy Narby’s book Serpent Cosmique (The Cosmic Serpent), which Pierre Bordage appears to have read. For Bordage, the “double serpent” symbolizes both shamanism and the double helix of DNA—a way of reconciling spirituality and science—by deliberately going against the traditional Christian symbolism associated with this animal.

However, these elements merely serve as a backdrop to the story. Vaï Ka’i’s shamanism is based on individual experience. The “Christ of Aubrac” explicitly tells Yann, his first disciple, that he must leave behind “no commandments, no laws, no obligations, no rites” linked to his teaching. (Note: Bordage 2007, p. 295) He also speaks of the importance of sharing experiences, (Note: Bordage 2007, p. 176) and warns against the mistake of building cathedrals to glorify the power of God (or man), when a cathedral is “in every tree, every bush, every blade of grass, every animal, every human being.”

==== Nomadism ====
The novel also recounts the conversion of part of society to a new lifestyle: neo-nomadism promoted by Vaï Ka’i. Pierre Bordage discusses nomadism in other works, including Les Derniers Hommes and Orchéron. Christ himself was a nomad. According to Roland Ernould, Pierre Bordage moved frequently throughout his life (including outside France) and views this way of life as “the only alternative to consumer society,” as it allows for respect of the Earth and detachment from possessions and social conditioning.

==== Critique of the Catholic church and sects ====
In an interview, the author elaborates on his critique of religion as expressed in his novel, noting “the staggering gap between the teachings of the Gospels and the Roman Church,” which he describes as a structure that is “hierarchical, intolerant, murderous, bogged down in its quarrels and dogmas.” He also highlights the difference between the spiritual message (such as that of Christ) and the interpretation given by priests, pastors, rabbis, and imams (citing, for example, the epistles of Saint Paul). The shamanism practiced by Vaï Ka’i, based on individual experience, does not inspire a need to impose his vision on others, whereas followers of religion “theorize, impose, and threaten.” Pierre Bordage continues to distinguish between religion and spirituality, saying that religion creates violence between what one wishes to be and what one is, while spirituality leads to self-understanding and acceptance as a human being. (Note: Université Bordeaux Montaigne, 20:00 - 21:45 min) This recurring message likely stems from his own personal journey, especially during his time at the minor seminary. (Note: Université Bordeaux Montaigne, 21:45 - 22:30 min) Claire Cornillon analyzes that the novel is not simply a critique of religion; it enables a rediscovery of the sacred in spirituality beyond religion. (Note: Université Bordeaux Montaigne, 3:15 - 3:30 min)

According to Michel Grisolia (L’Express), the author is also very critical of cults, far from glorifying any “guru.” Yet other literary critics are troubled by the novel’s message, seeing in it a myth of the noble savage, a glorification of the hippie movement, or even a rehabilitation of sects: Vaï Ka’i’s journey resembles a sect founding. Pierre Bordage addresses all the ambiguities raised by his character, using the character’s own words.

Within the Trilogy of the Prophecies, L’Évangile du Serpent is followed by L’Ange de l’abîme. The events described in this second volume show that Vaï Ka’i died in vain, without being able to prevent the emergence of a world dominated by money and obscurantism.

==== Critique of the media and capitalism ====
Translation of an excerpt from a dialogue of Marc, p. 279

[...] I'm just a link in the chain. Dependent on the chain. Fear, if you prefer. Fear of losing my job, my salary, my benefits. My two daughters are still my responsibility [...] Fear, nothing but fear. Fear of growing old, of giving up my comforts, my habits, other chains. (Note: Bordage 2007, p. 279)

The author denounces or ridicules other very contemporary concepts. The arrival of Vaï Ka’i causes a rift in society between his followers, who adopt his message (sometimes blindly), and intellectuals, scientists, industrialists, doctors, or even religious figures who denounce him and see him as a fraud or a danger. Pierre Bordage openly criticizes television and the media—their mediocrity, sensationalism, partisan productions, herd-like reactions to the “hype man,” and the “vanity of panels of so-called specialists.” In L’Évangile du Serpent, the (fictional) channel Télé Max hires men and women [who conspire] “like soldiers in an army ready to sweep over the world [...] They wore the corporate culture as a uniform, they shared the values of Télé Max, they spoke the language of Télé Max, they fought for a media future entirely revised and corrected by Télé Max.” (Note: Bordage 2007, p. 524) According to Philippe Cesse, the televised debates described in the book recall theological quarrels of the past.

The strategy put in place by Télé Max to discredit Vaï Ka’i ends in a crushing failure, as viewers remember mainly the Christ of Aubrac’s only speech at the end of the broadcast, delivered in great calm, standing in contrast to “the inaudible mush of his opponents.” (Note: Bordage 2007, p. 538)

Pierre Bordage also attacks modern urban life, capitalism, and the law of the market. He defends the environment, among other things, through quotes and proverbs, but also the message of Vaï Ka’i. He denounces the excesses of security measures: “oral communication was the only guarantee of confidentiality,” (Note: Bordage 2007, p. 472) the suspicion that drives the invention of new laws, (Note: Bordage 2007, pp. 442–443) self-interest, and the “devastation of the Earth.” (Note: Bordage 2007, p. 175) Bordage frequently cites the powerful men leading the Christian West, who “plunder their colonies, keep three-quarters of humanity in poverty, place their pawns at the heads of states, stoke greed and hatred, provoke wars, and keep exclusive access to natural resources for themselves.” (Note: Bordage 2007, pp. 429–430)

== Reception and award ==
The critical reception of L’Évangile du Serpent is varied. Some readers may feel uneasy reading this novel, which portrays a large part of society negatively (doctors, architects, religious figures, holders of knowledge, industrialists, and politicians are all criticized), and see the message as a “New Age ideal”: Pascal Patoz (NooSFere) judges that the novel “has enough to irritate and disturb both atheists and believers. But the discourse, by its very ambiguity, becomes as fascinating as the plot is thrilling by its rhythm.”

In L’Express, Michel Grisolia analyzes the novel as a “formidable rereading of the Gospels through the lens of ecology and shamanism, a Bible of nomadism and insubordination, a fictional grenade against property, borders, the merchants of the temple, and all forms of sectarianism.” Pascal Patoz calls it “a real thriller that can be devoured in one sitting.” For Pierre Cesse, in ArtsLivres, the novel is “above average,” a good novel without being a masterpiece. The essayist and critic Roland Ernould says that the book “is easy to read,” but that “Bordage lacked enough persuasive power to convince us that what his Messiah proposes is less utopian than achievable.” Likewise, for Jérôme Vincent of ActuSF, the book can be devoured despite its length, but it lacks a “certain something,” which makes it an excellent book but not a masterpiece.

In a review published in Première, Benjamin Berton finds the book “somewhat disappointing and convoluted.” Olivier Girard is also very reserved in the science fiction journal Bifrost. The book’s premise initially won him over, but the result is disappointing: “a beautiful mechanism without a soul.” He adds that Bordage has “perhaps become too confident in his talent, too complacent in his writing,” and that the book “can be read, but is not experienced.” Stéphane Manfredo makes a similar comment in the journal Galaxies, noting a pleasant but not gripping read, a well-written book that lacks strength and ambition.

This book received the Bob Morane Prize for Best Francophone Novel in 2002. In an interview given in 2008, seven years after the book’s publication, Pierre Bordage said that no religious congregation had sent him any criticism, probably “because the devotees haven’t read it.”

== See also ==
- Pierre Bordage
