= Lac de Saint-Andéol =

Lake in Lozère, France

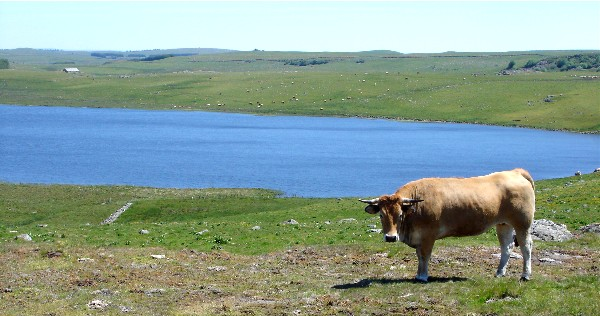

- Location within France
- Location: Lozère
- Coordinates: 44°37′07″N 03°04′54″E
- Basin countries: France
- Surface area: 0.11 km^{2} (0.042 sq mi)
- Max. depth: 30 m (98 ft)
- Surface elevation: 1,225 m (4,019 ft)
- Islands: none

Lac de Saint-Andéol is a lake in Lozère, France, located on the Aubrac plateau. It has an elevation of 1225 m and its surface area is 0.11 km². It is the most important lake of the plateau and known for its legends, and is of glacial origin like the other lakes in this area (Salhiens, Souveyrols, and Born).
