= L'Ange de l'abîme =

2004 dystopian novel by Pierre Bordage

L’Ange de l’abîme
- Author: Pierre Bordage
- Cover artist: Brad Wilson
- Genre: Novel
- Publisher: Au Diable Vauvert
- Publication date: 2004
- Publication place: France
- Pages: 476
- ISBN: 2-84626-066-4
- Preceded by: L'Évangile du serpent

L’Ange de l’abîme (in English: The Angel of the Abyss) is a dystopian novel by Pierre Bordage, published by Au Diable Vauvert in 2004. It is the second volume of the Prophecies trilogy, following L'Évangile du serpent. The narrative follows the initiatory journey of two teenagers, Stef and Pibe, through a Europe devastated by a holy war between Christian forces led by the Archangel Michael and Muslim groups referred to as "ousamas." The novel also features the interwoven stories of approximately twenty additional characters, presented in the form of short narratives within the main plot.

Inspired by the events of September 11, 2001, L'Ange de l'abîme revisits themes common in Bordage’s work, including religious extremism and the coming-of-age journey. The novel was generally well received by literary critics, though opinions varied.

== Summary ==
In L’Ange de l’abîme, Europe and the Islamic nations are depicted as being engaged in a global religious conflict, in which societal structures on both sides are dominated by religious doctrine. In this dystopian setting, abortion, extramarital unions, and interfaith relationships between Christians and Muslims are prohibited. Arabs living in Europe are confined to camps and subjected to systematic executions. Women are portrayed as being reduced to reproductive roles, expected to produce soldiers for the war effort. In Europe, the military forces are led by the Archangel Michael, who commands operations against the Muslim "ousamas." The protagonist, Pibe, a French teenager whose home is destroyed by a bombing, joins a group of unsupervised youth known as the cailleras. There, he meets Stef, another young person affected by the war. Together, they undertake a journey across Europe to confront the Archangel Michael in his bunker in Romania. Michael is depicted as seeking to establish a Christian "Eden" in Europe through the elimination of Muslims. The narrative reveals that the war is orchestrated by the United States government, which manipulates Michael to redirect Islamist hostility toward Europe, thereby weakening the continent geopolitically. Upon reaching Michael, Stef attempts to assassinate him but is killed in the process. (Note: Bordage 2005, p. 415) Pibe then shoots Michael and escapes. (Note: Bordage 2005, pp. 463–468) The novel concludes with Pibe hitchhiking, expressing a desire to travel to Muslim territories to meet the "ousamas" and “continue to explore the hearts of men.” (Note: Bordage 2005, p. 471)

== Background and publication ==
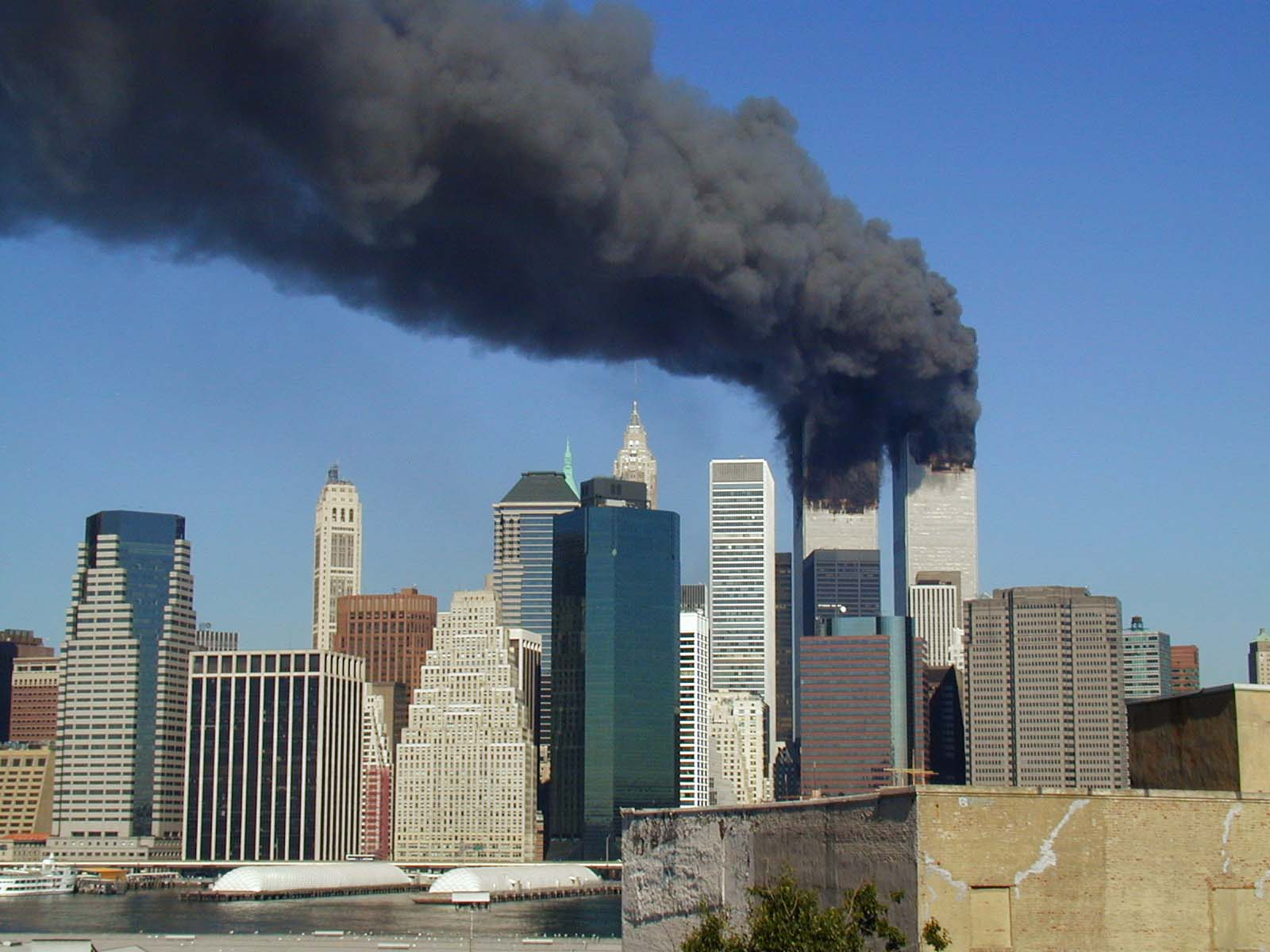
L'Ange de l'abîme is a work of speculative fiction inspired by the attacks of September 11, 2001.

L’Ange de l’abîme was inspired by the September 11 attacks, particularly the political discourse surrounding the "Axis of Evil," which influenced Pierre Bordage in developing the novel's themes. The book was first published in February 2004 in large format by Au Diable Vauvert. Its cover features an image of an assault rifle in front of a damaged industrial building. In 2005, the novel was reissued as part of a boxed set containing all three volumes of the Prophecies trilogy, which includes L'Évangile du serpent (Volume 1) and Les Chemins de Damas (Volume 3). A Kindle edition was released via Amazon on July 5, 2012.

In October 2006, L’Ange de l’abîme was republished by Le Livre de Poche in its "Thriller" collection. The cover depicts a statue of an angel positioned above a metal bridge, with a train passing beneath.

== Characters ==
The novel centers on two main characters, Pibe and Stef. The characterization was noted positively by Philippe Curval in Le Magazine littéraire, who stated that “Bordage knows how to reveal, in subtle strokes, the inner and outer selves of his characters, their hidden motives, and the forces that drive them.”

=== Pibe ===
Pibe is a thirteen-year-old boy who undergoes significant personal development throughout the novel, transforming from a fearful child into a confident adolescent. After losing his parents in a bombing, his journey through a war-torn environment exposes him to various hardships, including theft, violence, and intimate relationships. According to the narrative, his name is derived from Diego Maradona’s nickname El Pibe de Oro, admired by his grandfather. The initials “P” and “B” in “Pibe” also correspond to those of the author, Pierre Bordage. The theme of a young protagonist undergoing an initiatory journey is a recurring element in Bordage's body of work.

=== Stef ===
The second main character is Stef, a sixteen-year-old girl also referred to by the nickname “Fesse.” Influenced by Hinduism, she serves as a protective and guiding presence for Pibe and is characterized by her consistent optimism. Often described as the novel’s “glimmer of hope,” Stef is portrayed with qualities that suggest an almost superhuman or “angelic” nature, though she remains an ordinary, intelligent, and perceptive individual. According to the character of the Archangel Michael, Stef is the daughter of his former associate, Nicolae Dimitrescu. (Note: Bordage 2005, p. 463) However, Pibe ultimately concludes that her lineage is irrelevant, as her actions, particularly her refusal to continue the cycle of violence initiated by her predecessors, define her character. (Note: Bordage 2005, p. 469)

=== Other characters ===
L’Ange de l’abîme features approximately twenty additional characters whose intersecting narratives depict a Europe engulfed in a holy war. These individual storylines, sometimes structured as self-contained episodes within the novel, contribute to a broader portrayal of the societal impact of the conflict. Some characters appear only briefly. Among them are a couple marginalized for defying religious norms, a bourgeois woman pursuing prohibited experiences, a young European soldier en route to the front, (Note: Bordage 2005, pp. 303–316) a concentration camp officer who takes his own life alongside an "ousama" woman due to the impossibility of expressing his love, and an individual aiming to succeed the Archangel Michael.

== Analysis ==
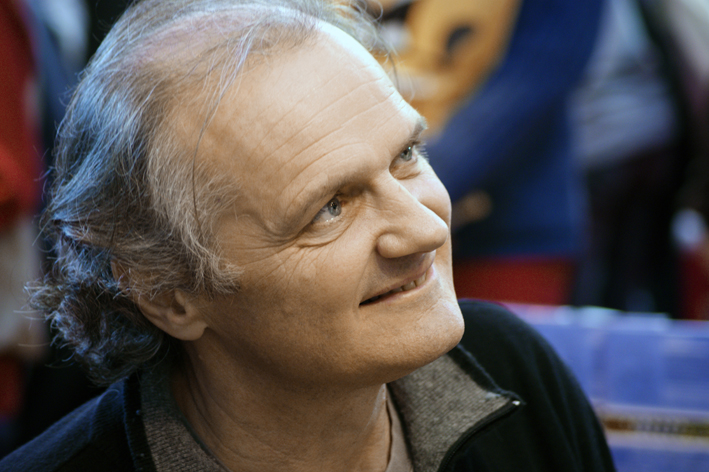
Pierre Bordage, author of L'Ange de l'Abîme.

L’Ange de l’abîme is a dystopian novel that explores themes recurrent in Pierre Bordage’s work, including the initiatory journey, the transformation of spirituality into fanaticism, and the use of dogmatic religion as a means of controlling women and, by extension, future generations.

=== Dystopian fiction ===
Stef had taught him to see beyond appearances [...] Stef was just a dream. He himself was just a dream. (Note: Bordage 2005, p. 470)

Published in 2004, L’Ange de l’abîme is part of a wave of dystopian novels addressing the consequences of the September 11 attacks, a theme that has significantly influenced thriller and science fiction authors. The novel aligns with works by Maurice G. Dantec, such as Villa Vortex, and Transparences by Ayerdhal, which were published the same year by the same publisher. The journal Futuribles described it as “a particularly dark dystopian and science fiction novel.”

Benjamin Berton considers the novel to provide “the most accurate possible portrait of a potential future for present-day Europe, only a few decades (years?) away.” In contrast, Le Cafard cosmique regards the political reflection as underdeveloped, viewing the work more as an urban fantasy than a futuristic thriller. Nathalie Labrousse of ActuSF interprets the novel not as a futuristic work but as a “reading of the present” that exposes old Western messianic reflexes. Cid Vicious, writing for Bifrost, critiques the novel’s portrayal of international relations as incoherent and questions the credibility of a new holy war between Christian Europe and Islam, citing the decline of Christianity in Europe.

Jean-Christophe Rufin interprets Bordage’s work as imagining a future Europe undergoing complete “social and political deconstruction,” characterized by the rise of extreme groups whose conflicting interests ultimately converge. This theme is similarly explored in Absolute Friends by John le Carré, published the previous year.

=== Violence ===
The novel presents a pessimistic vision reminiscent of the Apocalypse, depicting intolerance and violence. Bordage explores the basest human instincts and employs direct language in the narrative. Despite this, the novel maintains a humanistic perspective, illustrating how two teenagers undertake “what must be done.” One of its themes highlights that wars and atrocities on all sides are justified in the name of “good” and a “sacred mission.”

Both sides in the conflict exhibit significant violence, which Pierre Bordage examines by analyzing “the mechanisms that push each side to use so much violence.” The novel incorporates a shadow play concept inspired by the Hindu mysticism of Māyā, suggesting that the world is an illusion. The character Stef seeks to uncover what lies behind this illusion of war. The narrative also includes references to elements from the First World War (such as trench warfare) and the Second World War (including extermination camps and the symbolism of two “L”s—Lance and Law—worn by legionnaires, evoking the Nazi swastika). Additionally, it alludes to the Legion of the Archangel Michael, a proto-fascist Christian movement active in interwar Romania, where the novel’s dictator is based.

Although the novel conveys a generally dark tone, Olivier Barrot notes that it contains significant humor, particularly through the depiction of a “Centre-Berry resistance network” whose actions are largely futile, serving as a homage to the resistance networks of the Second World War.

=== Religion ===
In a September 2004 article for Le Monde diplomatique, Pierre Bordage elaborated on his perspective of religion as reflected in the novel: “As soon as religion pokes its nose into human affairs, we can fear the worst. [...] They are all the same. They are all machines of exclusion, oppression, and destruction; they all claim to represent the one true god or gods, they all demand territories, borders, privileges, truths, dogmas; they should all be bagged up and drowned in valleys of tears.” The novel begins some chapters with quotations, primarily drawn from two texts regarded as more spiritual than religious: the Holy Bible translated by Canon Crampon (Note: Bordage 2005, pp. 7, 109, 165, 469) and the Bhagavad Gītā. (Note: Bordage 2005, pp. 52, 231, 293, 353, 411)

Within the Trilogy of the Prophecies, L’Ange de l’abîme follows L'Évangile du serpent. The prophet Vaï Ka’i, who advocated a return to nature and neo-nomadism, dies without preventing the rise of a world dominated by money and obscurantism. According to Jean-François Thomas, while both novels focus on religion, they present contrasting perspectives: in L'Ange de l'Abîme, Vaï Ka’i preaches a positive message, yet his presence leads others toward evil; by contrast, L'Évangile du Serpent features Pibe, a teenage criminal who embodies evil but ultimately brings about good.

=== Literary style ===
Several critics have noted that the writing style in L'Ange de l'Abîme demonstrates a “virtuosity that stands out from [Bordage’s] previous books.” Influenced by Latin, Bordage’s earlier work tended toward mannerism and long sentences. In this novel, descriptions are concise, and the dialogues are described by Nathalie Labrousse as “perfectly paced, willingly slangy, and often laced with biting irony.”

== Reception ==
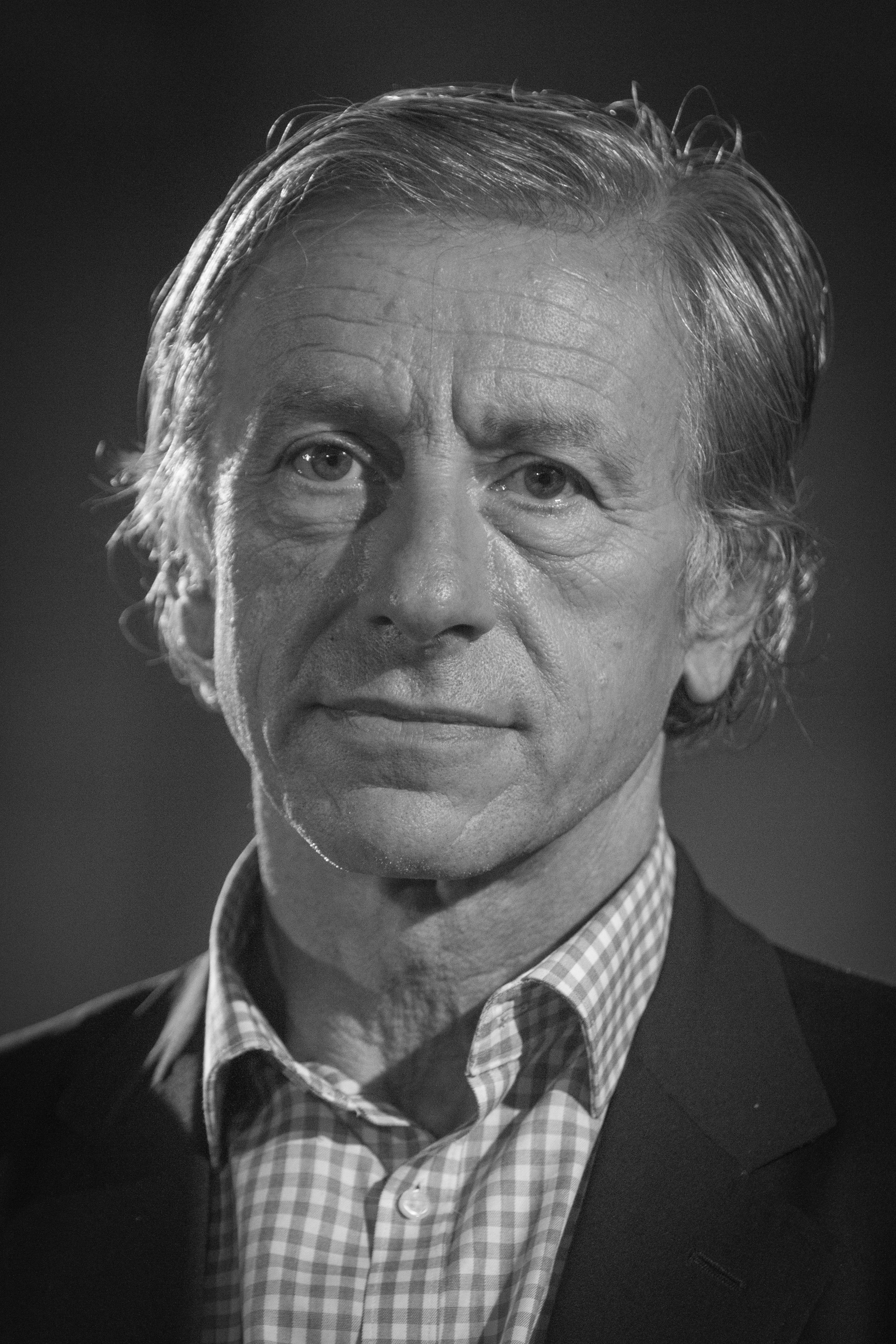
Jean-Christophe Rufin gives a very favorable review of L'Ange de l'Abîme.

The novel received varied critical responses, mostly positive. Jean-Christophe Rufin, writing in Le Monde diplomatique, stated that the literary rigor of this novel and its predecessor elevates Pierre Bordage from “genre fiction” to “literature, plain and simple.” In Libération, Frédérique Roussel described the novel as making “an impression.” Olivier Delcroix of Le Figaro littéraire regarded L'Ange de l'Abîme as one of Bordage’s most significant novelistic achievements.

Nathalie Labrousse, writing for NooSFere, described the novel as a “horrific and masterful book, as disturbing as it is admirable,” highlighting Pierre Bordage’s status as a significant writer through the work’s “reading of the present.” Jonas Lenn, in the journal Galaxies, called it a “novel of absolute mastery,” demonstrating that “Bordage is an exceptional writer.” In Première, Benjamin Berton referred to The Ange de l'Abîme as a “happy surprise” and “the truly great visionary adventure novel,” following the more convoluted Évangile du Serpent. Laure Ricote, in ActuSF, described it as an “enchanting novel to open, to read, and to reflect on.”

Le Cafard cosmique described the plot as “predictable” but noted that the interlude chapters, portraying about twenty characters, provide depth and substance. Jean-François Thomas, writing in 24 Heures, characterized the novel as a “harsh, bloody, cruel book, where death and perversion are everywhere,” without offering direct praise or criticism.

Some reviews of the novel are negative. A 2006 literary analysis described it as “a clumsy and clichéd depiction of a future Europe plagued by holy war.” In the science fiction journal Bifrost, critic Cid Vicious characterized the book as sordid and simplistic, calling it “a Mad Max knockoff with a Bible-and-Qur’an twist.” He criticized the narrative as “incoherent in many respects” and regarded it as “a bundle of dubious, even criminal shortcuts in the current context.” However, he acknowledged that the novel’s structure is elaborate and the storytelling “hyper-controlled,” noting that Pierre Bordage narrowly avoids failure “thanks to his undeniable talent as a storyteller.”

== See also ==
- Pierre Bordage
- L'Évangile du serpent
