= Gyeonmyo jaengju =

Korean folktale about dogs and cats

Gyeonmyo jaengju is a Korean folktale that has been traditionally cited as the reason why cats and dogs fail to get along with each other. The story appears in numerous variations in several collections of historical folktales.

The story is about a precious marble gifted to a poor fisherman by a mythic carp. After the marble is stolen, the fisherman's dog and cat, out of gratitude for their master, steal back the marble. On their way home, the cat loses the marble and the two fight about it. The cat ultimately retrieves the marble and returns it to the fisherman.

== History and transmission ==
Gyeonmyo jaengju has been passed down orally all over Korea. More than fifteen variations of the tale are included in major Korean folktale collections such as Hanguk gubi munhak daegye (한국구비문학대계 Compendium of Korean Oral Literature).

During a shamanistic rite called Mangmutgut primarily performed in the Hamgyeong Province of Korea, a song called Donjeon puri (돈전풀이The Origin of Money) is performed to lyrics about a protagonist who comes into possession of a treasure with help from a snake and a cat. In ways like this, Gyeonmyo jaengju has been fused with other stories and passed down in diverse variations over the years. In the late twentieth century, the folktale was introduced in elementary school Korean language textbooks, which made it familiar to many in modern-day Korea.

== Plot ==
=== Summary ===
Once there was an old man who caught fish for a living. One day, the fisherman caught a large carp but let it go when he saw the carp shedding tears. When the fisherman went to the seashore the next day, a boy appeared, introduced himself as the son of the Dragon King of the Sea, and told the fisherman that he was the carp the fisherman had spared the day before. The boy went on to thank the old fisherman and invited him to the Dragon King's palace. The fisherman was well received by the Dragon King and gifted with a precious marble that would make him rich once he returned home. Hearing news of this, an old woman in the neighboring village stole the precious marble by secretly switching it with a different marble, which dragged the old fisherman back into poverty.

The cat and the dog living with the fisherman saw the burglary as an opportunity to express their gratitude to their master and set out for the old woman's house in the neighboring village. The cat and the dog threatened the mouse living at the old woman's house to find out where she hid the precious marble.

While making their way back home, the dog had to swim across a river while the cat sat on the dog's back with the marble in its mouth. However, when the dog kept asking the cat whether it was safely holding on to the marble, the cat finally opened its mouth to answer and dropped the marble into the river. This caused the cat and the dog to fight, after which the dog left for home and the cat remained by the riverside to eat some fish. When the precious marble turned up inside the fish it was eating, the cat brought the marble back to its master. From then on, the fisherman gave preference to the cat and kept the dog outside the house, which is how the relationship between the cat and the dog turned from friend to foe.

=== Variation ===
Gyeonmyo jaengju is composed of multiple parts including the part where the fisherman spares the carp's life, the part where the old woman tricks the fisherman into losing his marble, and the part where the cat and the dog fight because of the marble. The cat and dog fight tends to be combined with different parts to create variations of this tale that largely fall under two types: one that combines the cat and dog fight with the part about the carp returning the favor, and the other that combines the cat and dog fight with the fisherman's wife defeating a python (imugi). Variations of the second type feature a python filled with resentment toward the fisherman, which the fisherman's wife wisely defeats. Some variations skip much of the details related to how the fisherman obtains the marble. In other variations, the person who steals the marble is not an old woman from a nearby village, but a friend of the fisherman or a peddler.

== Features and Significance ==
Gyeonmyo jaengju is the quintessential story of animals repaying the kindness of humans. The Dragon King's son who shapeshifts into a carp repays the kindness shown by the fisherman. When the fisherman finds himself in a crisis, the cat and the dog set out to retrieve the treasure to show their appreciation to their master. Such developments hint at the moral that animals not only show gratitude toward good deeds humans do, but also help humans overcome the difficulties they encounter.

== Analysis ==
=== Tale type ===
Gyeonmyo jaengju is a story passed down not only in Korea, but in other parts of the world including Asia, Europe, Africa, North America, and South America. The story corresponds to tale type ATU 560, "The Magic Ring", in the international Aarne-Thompson-Uther Index.

=== Parallels ===
According to folklorist Wolfram Eberhard, variants of the tale type in China and other countries serve to explain the rivalry between cats and dogs. Similarly, according to Korean scholarship, the tale shows the beginning of the rivalry between the cat and the dog, after both animals retrieve a magical object for their owner.

== Translations ==
A version of the story was translated into English by Horace Newton Allen as The Enchanted Wine Jug.

== Other ==
From November 20, 2018, to October 12, 2020, the Children's Museum of the National Folk Museum of Korea held an exhibition inspired by Gyeonmyo jaengju titled “The Dog, the Cat, and the Magic Marble.”

== See also ==
- The Enchanted Watch (French folktale)

== Sources ==
- “The Dog and the Cat,” Compendium of Korean Oral Literature.
- “The Dog and Cat Fight Over the Marble,” Compendium of Korean Oral Literature.
- “Why Dogs and Cats Hate Each Other,” Compendium of Korean Oral Literature.
