= Lynne Isbell =

American ethologist and primatologist

Lynne A. Isbell (born 1955) is an American ethologist and primatologist, and Distinguished Professor Emerita of Anthropology at the University of California, Davis.

Isbell has served as president of the American Society of Primatologists and is the originator of the snake detection theory, which suggests that snakes have contributed to the evolution of the visual system of primates.

== Early life ==
Isbell grew up in Compton, California. At school, she had the ambition to become a veterinarian, but was inspired to take an interest in primatology by Jane Goodall’s book In the Shadow of Man (1971).

In Black, Brown, and White: Stories Straight Outta Compton, written with two friends from different ethnic backgrounds, Isbell has written about their lives in Compton during the 1960s and early 1970s, the era of the civil rights movement, the Watts riots, and black power. They describe how Compton changed from a mostly white community to a mostly black one that was known as "the Murder Capital of the United States." The title refers to Straight Outta Compton, an album by N.W.A.

As an undergraduate at the University of Redlands, Isbell worked with ungulates, including bongos and desert bighorn sheep, and graduated BA in ethology from Johnston College of the University in 1976.

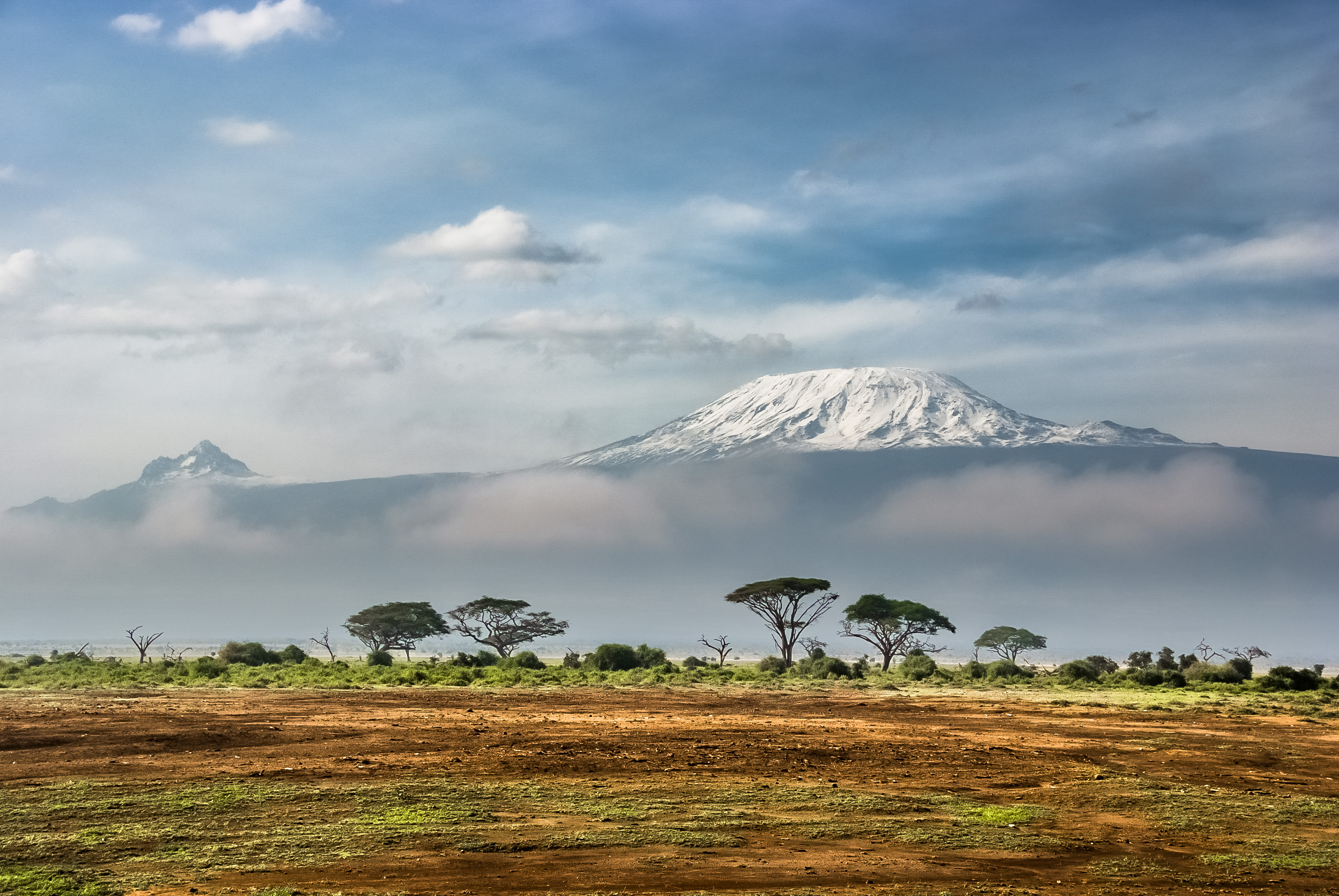
Amboseli, with Mount Kilimanjaro

Isbell's focus on primates came after moving to Davis, California, when she volunteered to work on a year-long behavioral project with captive bonnet macaques. She spent two years in the field at Tom Struhsaker's study site in Uganda before entering graduate school at UC Davis, planning a dissertation on the behavior and ecology of the red colobus monkey, but took the opportunity instead to study vervet monkeys. After fieldwork in the Amboseli National Park, Kenya, she received a PhD from UC Davis in 1990, with a dissertation on "Influences of Predation and Resource Competition on the Social System of Vervet Monkeys (Cercopithecus aethiops) in Amboseli National Park, Kenya" supervised by Peter Rodman.

== Career ==
Isbell's first academic job was as reader for the class of Meredith Small. She gained her Ph.D. in Animal Behavior from UC Davis in 1990.

She was an assistant professor at Rutgers University from 1992 to 1996 and has been at University of California, Davis, since 1996, where she is currently a full professor. Her field of research is primate behavior, ecology, and evolutionary history, with focuses on aspects of food competition, predation, dispersal, and ranging behaviour.

Apart from Isbell's long-term fieldwork in Kenya and Uganda, she has also carried out shorter-term work in Tanzania, the Democratic Republic of Congo, Madagascar, and Rwanda.

Isbell has published work on the origin of primates, on predation, food competition, the ecology of social relationships, the evolution of group living, and bipedalism and is the author of an award-winning book, The Fruit, the Tree, and the Serpent: Why We See So Well (2009), which proposes the snake detection theory, largely attributing the advanced evolution of the visual system of primates to the need to detect snakes.

In 2022, Isbell was elected a Fellow of the American Association for the Advancement of Science (AAAS)

== Honours ==
- W. W. Howells Book Award for Biological Anthropology, American Anthropological Association, 2014
- Elected to California Academy of Sciences, 2015
- Primates 2020 Most Cited Paper Award (with S. F. Etting), 2017
- President-Elect, American Society of Primatologists, 2018–2020
- President, American Society of Primatologists, 2020–2022
- Fellow, American Association for the Advancement of Science (AAAS)

== Selected publications ==
- "Ants on swollen-thorn acacias: species coexistence in a simple system" Oecologia 109:1 (December 1996), 98–107
- "Diet for a small primate: Insectivory and gummivory in the (large) patas monkey (Erythrocebus patas pyrrhonotus)", American Journal of Primatology 45:4 (1998), 381–398
- "Is there no place like home? Ecological bases of dispersal in primates and their consequences for the formation of kin groups" in B. Chapais and C. Berman, eds., Kinship and Behavior in Primates (Oxford University Press, 2004), pp. 71–108
- "Snakes as agents of evolutionary change in primate brains", Journal of Human Evolution, 51:1 (1 July 2006), 1–35
- The Fruit, the Tree, and the Serpent: Why We See So Well (New York: Harvard University Press, 2009, ISBN 9780674033016)
- "Demography and Life Histories of Sympatric Patas Monkeys, Erythrocebus patas, and Vervets, Cercopithecus aethiops, in Laikipia, Kenya", International Journal of Primatology 30:1 (2009), 103–124
- "Decline in the geographical range of the southern patas monkey Erythrocebus patas baumstarki in Tanzania Kenya", Oryx 43:2 (April 2009), 267–274
- "Factors influencing hair loss among female captive rhesus macaques (Macaca mulatta)", Applied Animal Behaviour Science, 119:1–2 (2009), 91–100
- "Pulvinar neurons reveal neurobiological evidence of past selection for rapid detection of snakes" in Proceedings of the National Academy of Sciences 110 (2013), 19000–19005
- "Large carnivores make savanna tree communities less thorny" in Science 346 (2014), 346–349
- "GPS-identified vulnerabilities of savannah-woodland primates to leopard predation and their implications for early hominins", Journal of Human Evolution 118 (2018), 1–13
- "Absentee owners and overlapping home ranges in a territorial species", Behavioral Ecology and Sociobiology 75 (2021), 21
- L. A. Isbell, R. Pantaleon, B. Bradshaw, Black, Brown, and White: Stories Straight Outta Compton (Davis, California: Bobely Books, 2022)
