= Snake detection theory =

Evolutionary theory regarding primate vision

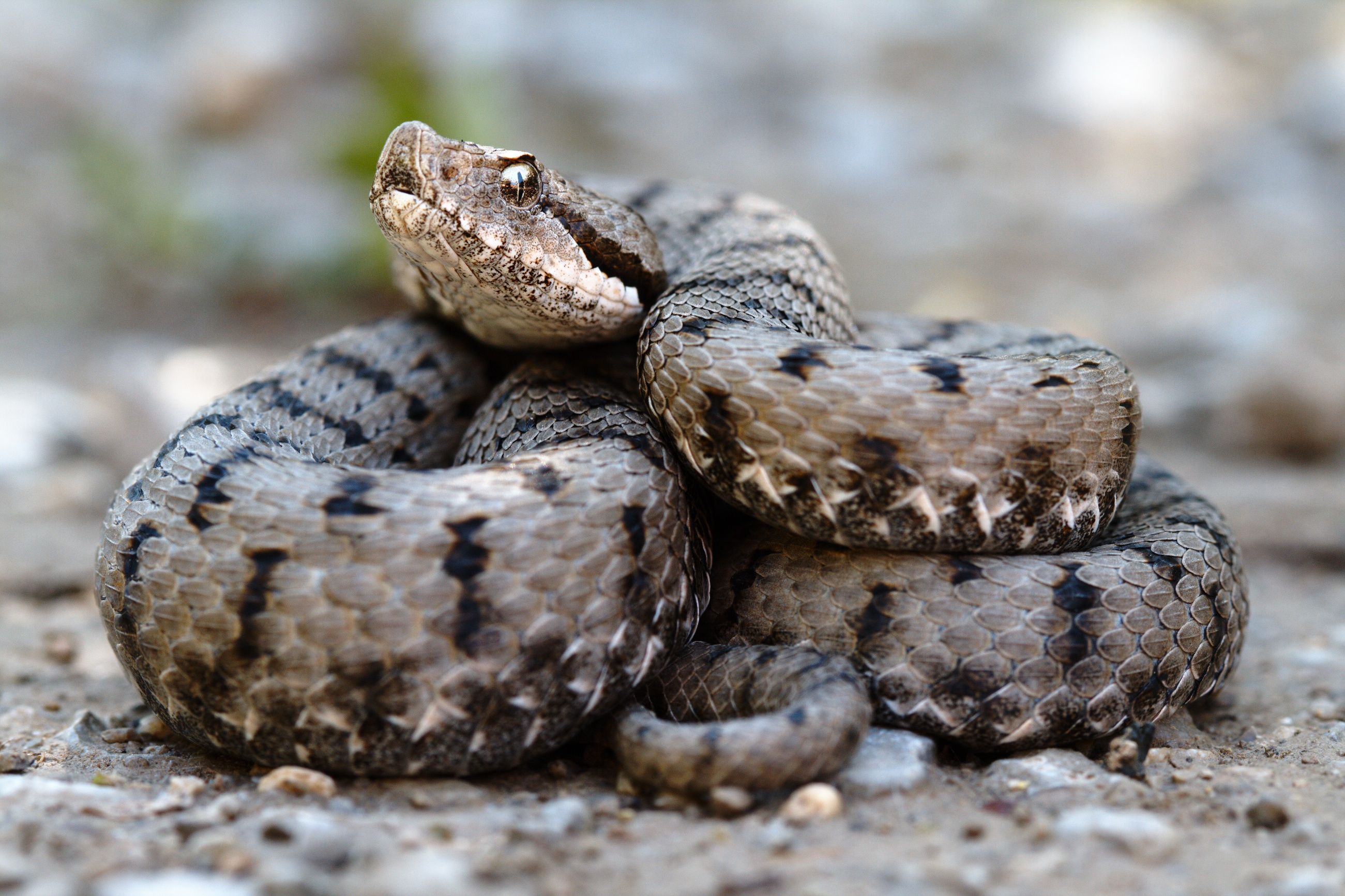
According to the Snake Detection Hypothesis, venomous and life-threatening snakes, including asp vipers, were crucial for the evolution of primates' visual systems.

The snake detection theory (SDT; also the snake detection hypothesis) suggests that snakes contributed to the evolution of visual systems in primates. According to the theory, predatory pressure on early primate populations from snakes selected individuals who were best able to recognize them, improving their survival chances and therefore transferring such skill to their offspring. From this point of view, snakes were responsible for the modification and expansion of primate visual systems which made vision the most developed sensory interface with the external environment for modern primates. In her book The Fruit, the Tree, and the Serpent (2009), anthropologist Lynne Isbell writes that snakes evolved to be difficult to detect and mortally dangerous. Surviving the peril of snakes for millions of years required selective pressure favoring primates' specialized visual systems. Compared to that of other mammals, the pulvinar region of the brain – which helps to visually detect relevant objects – is disproportionately large and effective in the brains of primates (including humans).

The concept of snakes being a special threat to humans has been confirmed by population-based studies. Ophidiophobia (phobia of snakes) is one of the most common and intense phobias among the general population. Furthermore, a study reported that around 50% of people experience dreams about snakes.

== Empirical studies ==
Many empirical studies have found evidence for the theory. Primates, including humans, can quickly detect snakes. Some studies have found that humans can detect snake images before subjective visual perception. However, the pre-conscious detection of snake stimuli is still under debate by the scientific community. Regardless, in experiments, images of snakes have been detected more rapidly than other fear-relevant stimuli: empirical studies have shown that snakes are more rapidly detected than spiders (whose exposure induces stimulus-specific psychophysiological correlates even if lasting 30 or 17 milliseconds only). According to the snake detection theory, this is because the arachnids were, historically, a less relevant threat to primates. Snake stimuli are particularly distracting during perceptual tasks, suggesting that the brain preferentially processes snake stimuli, even when attentional processes are demanded by other targets. Enhanced snake detection has also been found in young children.

Brain imaging investigations have found further evidence for the theory. Support for the idea of a high visual sensitivity to snakes has been proven in primate neural activity in response to snake threats. Non-invasive electroencephalogram (EEG) studies have found an enhanced visual brain activity in response to images of snakes in humans.
