= The Enchanted Watch =

Czech fairy tale

The Enchanted Watch is a Czech fairy tale collected by Jan Karel Hraše (1840–1907). Andrew Lang included it in his The Green Fairy Book (1892).

== Synopsis ==
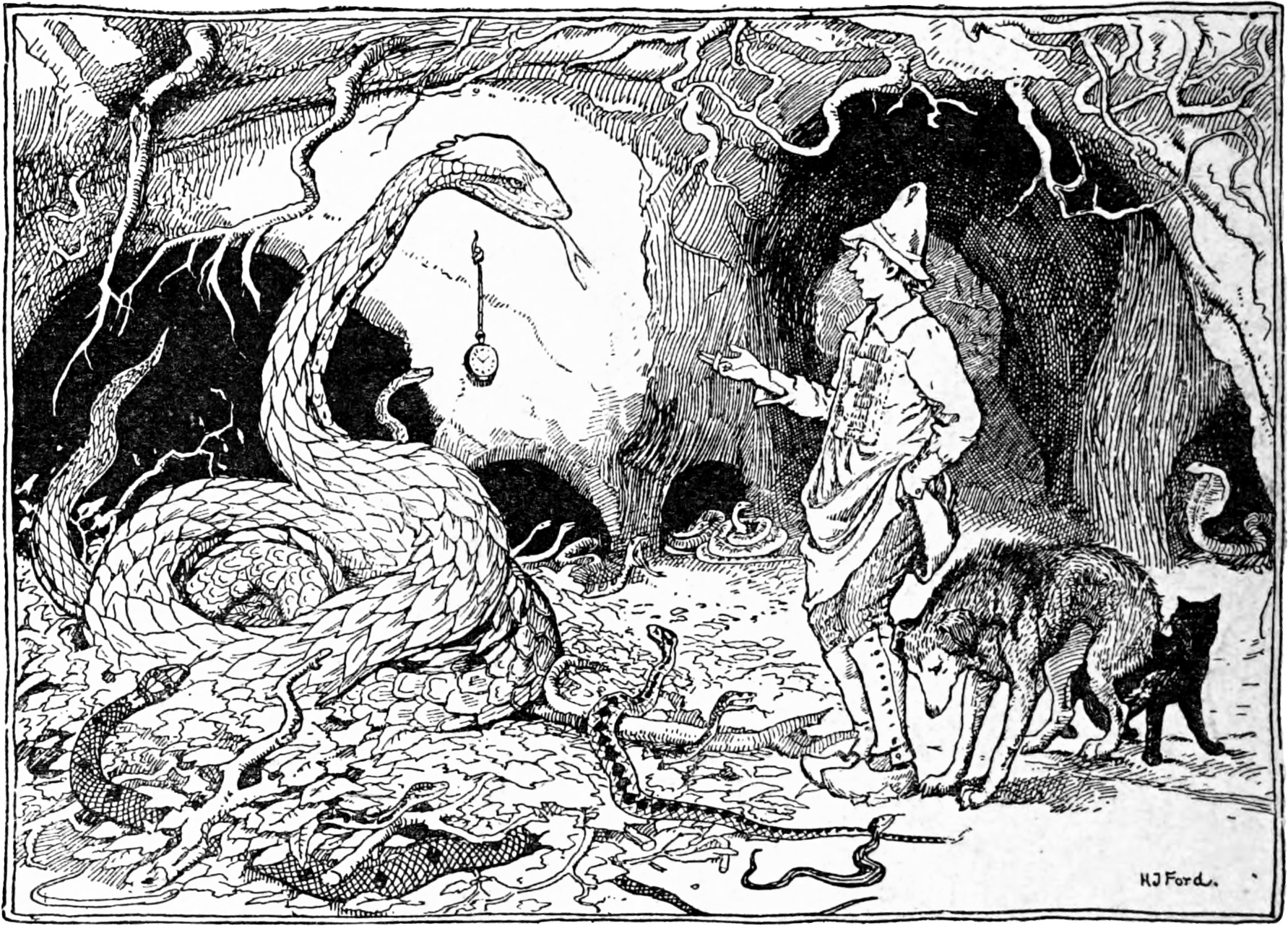
The youth at the court of the King of Snakes. Illustration from The Green Fairy Book (1892).

A rich man's oldest two sons went out and saw the world for three years apiece and came back. The foolish youngest son also wanted to go, and his father finally let him, expecting never to see him again. On the way, he saw men about to kill a dog, and asked them to give it to him instead; they did. He acquired a cat and a snake by the same manner. The snake brought him to the king of snakes, telling him how he would have to explain his absence, but then the king would want to reward the son. He told him to ask for a watch, which, when he rubbed it, would give him whatever he wanted.

He went home. Because he wore the same dirty clothing he set out in, his father flew into a rage. A few days later, he used the watch to make a house and invite his father to a feast there. Then he invited the king and the princess. The king was impressed by the marvels the son conjured to entertain them and married the princess to him. Soon, because he was so foolish, his wife wearied of him. She learned of the watch, stole it, and fled.

The son set out with the dog and cat. They saw an island with a house where the princess had fled and conjured up the house to live. The dog swam to it with the cat on its back; the cat stole it and carried it back in its mouth. The dog asked it how far it was to land, and the cat finally answered; the watch fell from its mouth. The cat caught a fish and freed it only when it promised to bring back the watch. It did so, and they restored the watch to the son. He wished the princess and her house and island to drown in the sea and went back home.

== Analysis ==
=== Tale type ===
The first part of the tale, the rescue of the son of the king of serpents by the poor man and the reward of the wish-granting object (usually a magic stone or ring), is close to the widespread tale of Aarne–Thompson–Uther tale type ATU 560, "The Magic Ring". This tale type is close to ATU 561, Aladdin and the Wonderful Lamp, and ATU 562, The Spirit in the Blue Light. Despite their narrative proximity, scholars Kurt Ranke and Karel Horálek distinguished these types by the presence of the helpful animals in retrieving the magic object (type 560).

In his extensive analysis of the tale type, folklorist Antti Aarne noted that the presence of the snake or serpent seemed to be ubiquitous in the general area of dispersion of the tale, with a few exceptions.

Russian scholarship divided the type's narrative sequence in 4 episodes:

1. purchase of cat and dog (and other animals)
2. receiving the ring
3. hero's marriage with princess, who betrays him
4. retrieval of the ring.

=== Predecessors ===
A European literary predecessor of the tale type appears in Pentamerone, with the tale The Stone in the Cock's Head or The Rooster's Stone.

Russian folklorist Lev Barag stated that an Asian predecessor can be found in the Mongolian compilation of Siddhi Kûr, in the tale How the Brahmane became a King.

=== Distribution ===
French Slavicist Louis Léger translated the tale as La Montre Enchantée ("The Enchanted Watch"), crediting the tale as originally being titled "Hloupy Jenik" in Hraše's 1874 collection Kytice z českých národních pověstí.

Folklorist Andrew Lang, in the late 19th century, noted the existence in Punjaub, among the Bretons, the Albanians, the Greeks and the Russians, of a tale about a youth that gets a magical ring; the ring is stolen and he retrieves it with the aid of grateful animals he has helped in the past.

According to professor Yolando Pino Saavedra, the tale type ATU 560 enjoys more popularity in Eastern Europe.

Wolfram Eberhard reiterated its popularity in Eastern Europe, also citing that it is popular in the Near East, India, Japan and China.

Greek folklorist Georgios A. Megas stated that the tale type is "widely told in Greece", and reported 72 variants.

==== Asia ====
In a Dogri tale translated to English as True Friends, the prince (a Rajkumar) releases a snake from a snake charmer and, in gratitude, the animal takes the prince to its father, Nagaraj, the king of snakes, in Patal lok, the "nether world". The prince asks for the ring on the king's finger, which possesses magical powers.

In a Kalmuck variant, The Fortunes of Shrikantha, Shrikantha, the son of a Brahmin, saves a mouse, an ape and a little bear from being hurt by children. In gratitude, the animals accompany him. When the youth is accused of stealing from the king and thrown in the sea in a casket, the animals rescue him and take him to a deserted island. The ape finds a "talisman" that grants wishes and gives it to the boy. Shrikantha wishes for a great palace. When the boy gives the talisman to a caravan's master, the animals work together to retrieve it.

=== Literary variants ===
The theme was also explored by German author Clemens Brentano, with his literary work Das Märchen von Gockel und Hinkel (The Story of Gockel, Hinkel, and Gackeleia). His tale is also classified as type ATU 560, "The Magic Ring".

== See also ==
- The One-Handed Girl
- Gyeonmyo jaengju (Korean folktale)
