= Pierre Bordage =

French science fiction author (1955–2025)

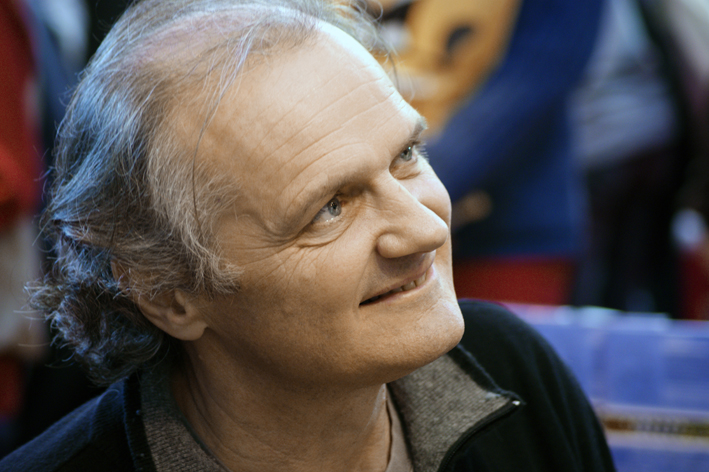
- Bordage in 2011
- Born: 29 January 1955; La Réorthe, Vendée, France
- Died: 26 December 2025 (aged 70)
- Citizenship: France
- Education: University of Nantes
- Occupation: Author
- Writing career
- Language: French
- Genres: Science fiction Fantasy

Pierre Bordage (29 January 1955 – 26 December 2025) was a French science fiction author. He won the Cosmos 2000 prize in 1996 for his novel La Citadelle Hyponéros.

== Life and career ==
Pierre Bordage was born in La Réorthe, Vendée, and was one of France's best-selling science fiction writers. His books have been translated in several European countries (Russia, Italy, Spain, Slovenia, Romania, etc.).

He was winner of the 2008 Cezam Prix Littéraire Inter CE for Porteur d’âmes.

Bordage was influenced by Philip José Farmer, Robert A. Heinlein, Frank Herbert, Orson Scott Card, and Star Wars.

Bordage died on 26 December 2025, at the age of 70.

== Bibliography ==
=== Rohel le conquérant ===
Rohel the conqueror 1992–1996

- Dame Asmine d'Alba cycle
  - Le Chêne Vénérable
  - Les maîtres sonneurs
  - Le monde des franges
  - Lune noire
  - Asmine d'Alba
- Lucifal cycle
  - Les anges du fer
  - Le grand fleuve-temps
  - L'enfant à la main d'homme
  - Les portes de Babûlon
  - Lucifal
- Saphir cycle
  - Terre intérieure
  - Les feux de Tarphagène
  - Le choeur du vent
  - Saphyr d'Antiter

=== Les guerriers du silence ===
(The Warriors of Silence) 1993–1998 Translated into English by Galatea Maman

- Les guerriers du silence
- Terra Mater
- La citadelle Hyponéros

=== Wang series ===
1996–1997

- Les portes d'occident (The Gates of the Occident)
- Les aigles d'orient

=== Other novels ===
- Abzalon (1998)
- Atlantis, les fils du rayon d'or (1998)
- Orchéron (2000)
- "Les Fables de l'Humpur"
- "L'evangile du Serpent"

=== L'enjômineur ===
- 1792
- 1793
- 1794

=== Les derniers hommes (the last men) (2000) ===
A near future, after the third world war. In a Europe devastated by chemical, nuclear and genetic pollution, the rare intact resources are shared between nomadic tribes who have taken charge of the exploitation of a specific element. Solman the lame man from the Aquarius tribe – who discovers and controls water sources – has a gift of clairvoyance: this gift puts him apart from everybody, as people do not trust him. Except the healer Raima, the mysterious kadija and an old scientist of the old world who accompany him on his quest to escape the apocalypse which seems to menace the last men.

=== La Fraternité du Panca ===
- Frère Ewen (2007)
- Soeur Ysolde (2008)
- Frère Kalkin (2010)
- Soeur Onden (2011)
- Frère Elthor (2012)
