= Lake Born =

Lake in France

- Lac de Born
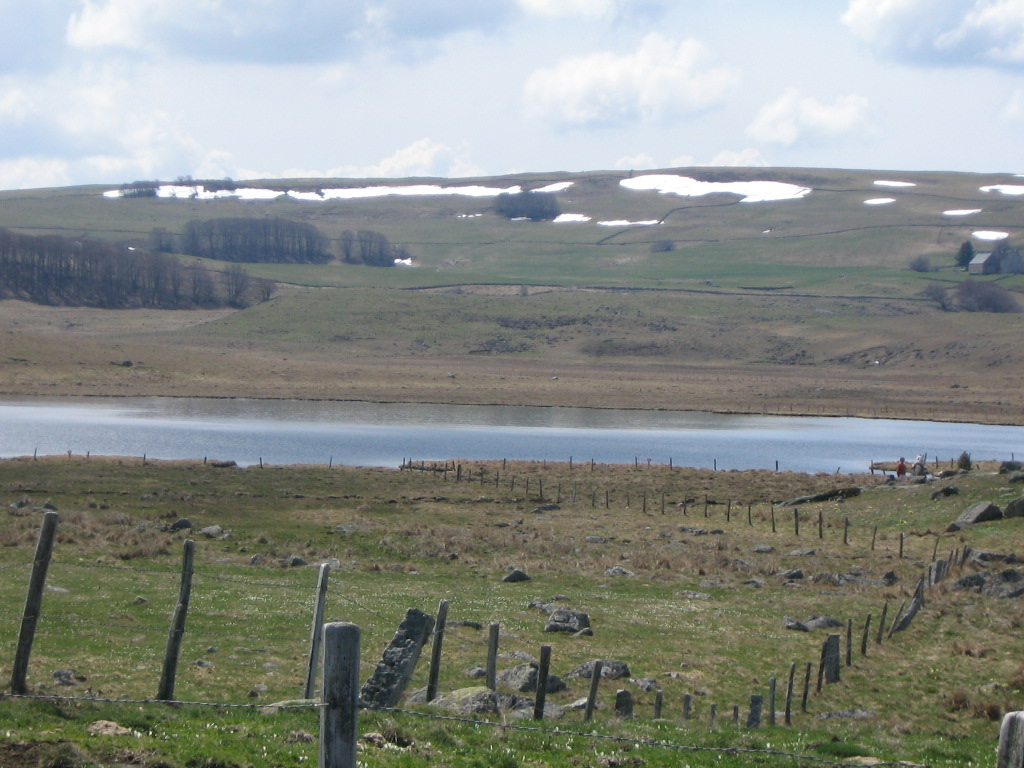

- Location within France
- Location: Lozère
- Coordinates: 44°36′29″N 03°06′00″E
- Basin countries: France
- Surface area: 0.05 km^{2} (0.019 sq mi)
- Max. depth: 10 m (33 ft)
- Surface elevation: 1,260 m (4,130 ft)
- Islands: none

Lake Born (Lac de Born) is a lake in Lozère, France, located on the Aubrac plateau. It has an elevation of 1260 m, making it the highest lake of the plateau.

The lake itself has a surface area of 0.05 km^{2}. It is surrounded by basalt. Like Lake St Andéol, which is also accessible along the D52, Lake Born is of volcanic origin.
