= Souveyrols lake =

Lake in Lozère, France

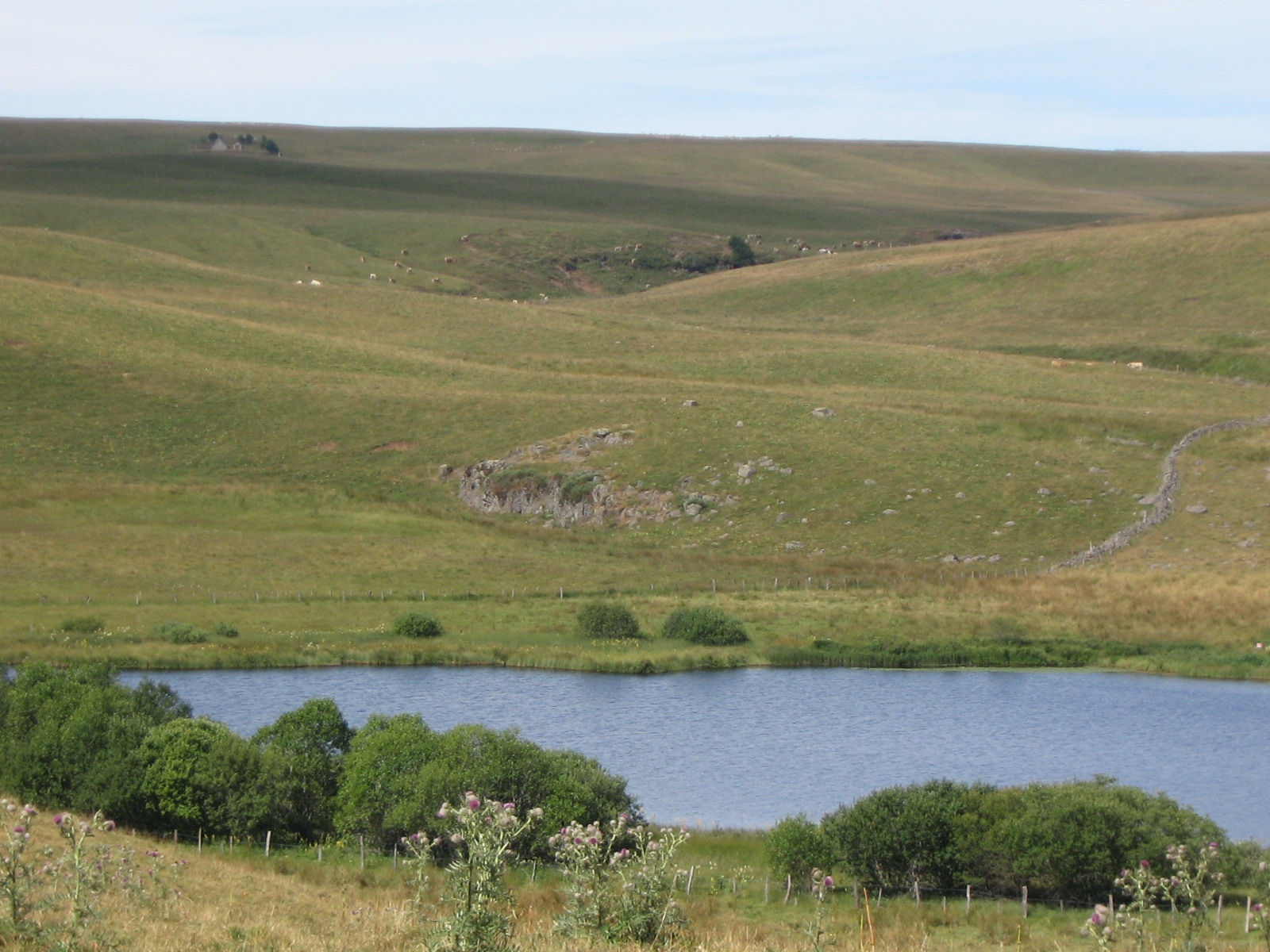
- The lake is surrounded by a typical landscape of the Aubrac plateau.

- Location within France
- Location: Lozère
- Coordinates: 44°37′38″N 03°03′12″E
- Basin countries: France
- Surface area: 0.016 km^{2} (0.0062 sq mi)
- Surface elevation: 1,220 m (4,000 ft)
- Islands: none

Souveyrols lake is a lake in Lozère, France on the Aubrac plateau. It has a glacial origin. Its surface area is 0.016 km^{2}. The lake is surrounded by a peat bog, there are red sphagnum moss (Sphagnum rubellum) mounds, green sphagnum moss meadows, and willowsand is also home to Ligularia sibirica, a rare plant that is protected in southern France. This boreal species is usually present in Russia and Siberia and is very rare in Western Europe.
