= Stéphanie Nicot =

French SF writer

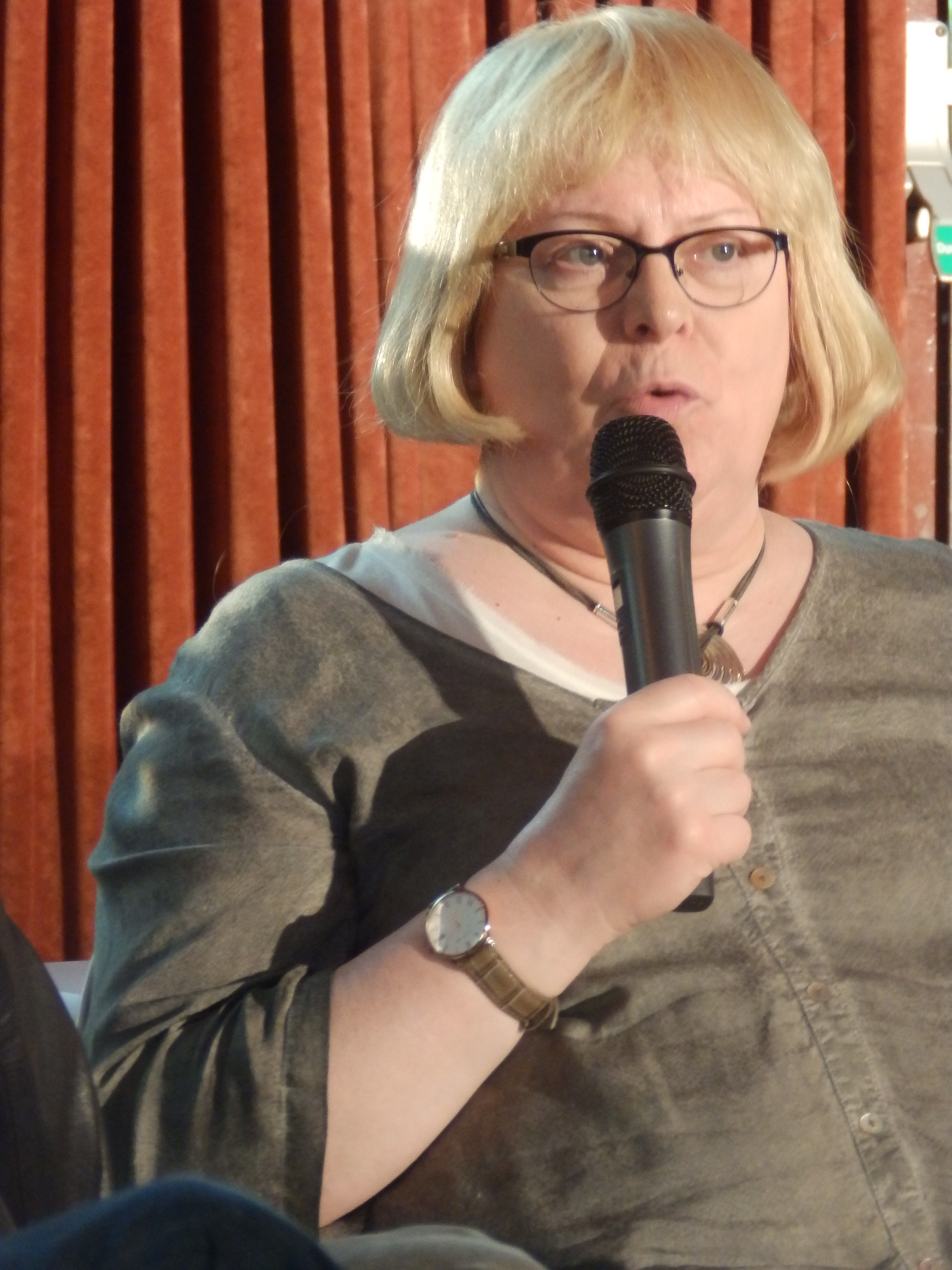
- Occupation: writer

Stéphanie Nicot (born 13 May 1952 in Saint-Brieuc) is a French essayist, anthologist, and literary critic, specialized in science fiction and fantasy.

== Biography ==
Stéphanie Nicot graduated in contemporary literature and information communication. She worked in a variety of professions before teaching literature and history in a vocational lycée, before devoting herself entirely to literature.

== Trans rights activism ==
She is a committed trans rights activist. She was assigned male at birth but had known herself to be female from a young age.. She started transitioning socially and medically after her daughter had grown up.

In 2004, she helped found the Trans Aide Association in Nancy, which later became the Association Nationale Transgenre. She was its president until she was appointed head of the LGBTI+ Federation in 2014.

With Alexandra Augst-Merelle, she published Changer de sexe : Identités transsexuelles, published by Le Cavalier Bleu in 2006.

In 2011 she married her wife, Elise, in one of the first same-sex marriages in France. Despite same-sex marriage being illegal at the time this was possible using a legal loophole as she had not been successful so far in petitioning for her gender to be changed on her legal documentation.

== Career in literature ==
From 1996 to 2007, Stéphanie Nicot was editor-in-chief of the magazine Galaxie (French magazine). In 2001, she founded the publishing house Imaginaire sans frontières. She is a specialist in fantasy literature. She became artistic director of the Les Imaginales literary festival when it was founded in Épinal in 2002. She coordinated all the anthologies published after the various editions, including Magiciennes et Sorciers, Victimes et Bourreaux and Les coups de cœur des Imaginales.

Her eviction from Les Imaginales by the Épinal town hall following the 2022 edition took place in a highly controversial context: the 2021 edition had been the occasion for several denunciations of sexism in the publishing world, and the festival organisers sanctioned – against Nicot's advice, it would seem – the personalities involved in the protests. The 2022 edition was once again the occasion for acts of protest against the management, acts that Nicot says she personally supported.

Several authors published a letter of support for Stéphanie Nicot, among which ïan Larue, Floriane Soulas, Silène Edgar, Sylvie Lainé, Robin Hobb, Estelle Faye, Sara Doke, Sylvie Denis, Lucie Chenu, Sarah Buschmann, Charlotte Bousquet and Anne Besson.

Since 2016, she has been head of the science fiction collection at Scrineo.

== Works ==
=== Anthologies ===
- Gouanvic, Jean-Marc; Nicot, Stéphanie, eds. (1983). Espaces imaginaires: anthologie de nouvelles de science-fiction (in French). Montréal, Québec, Canada: Les Imaginoïdes. ISBN 978-2-920513-00-6.
- Ruolz, France-Anne; Nicot, Stéphanie (2001). Les navigateurs de l'impossible (in French). Nancy: Imaginaires sans frontières. ISBN 978-2-84727-003-7.
- Détectives de l'impossible. Millénaires (in French). Paris: Éd. J'ai lu. 2002. ISBN 978-2-290-31877-5.
- Rois et capitaines. Icares (in French). Paris: les Éd. Mnémos. 2009. ISBN 978-2-35408-052-5.
- Magiciennes & sorciers (in French). Lyon: Éd. Mnémos. 2010. ISBN 978-2-35408-079-2.
- Victimes & bourreaux (in French). Saint-Laurent-d'Oingt: Éd. Mnémos. 2011. ISBN 978-2-35408-118-8.
- Dunyach, Jean-Claude; Nicot, Stéphanie (2011). Dimensions galaxies. Rivière blanche (in French). Encino (Calif.): Black Coat Press. ISBN 978-1-61227-013-5.
- Anthologie de la fantasy (in French). Paris: Flammarion-Jeunesse. 2012. ISBN 978-2-08-123371-3.
- Destinations: anthologies des Imaginales 2017 (in French). Imaginales. Saint-Laurent-d'Oingt: Mnémos. 2017. ISBN 978-2-35408-576-6.
- Grousset, Alain; Nicot, Stéphanie (2017). Anthologie du monstre (in French). Vanves: le Livre de poche jeunesse. ISBN 978-2-01-701007-4.
- Natures: anthologie des Imaginales 2019 (in French). Imaginales. Saint-Laurent-d'Oingt: Mnémos. 2019. ISBN 978-2-35408-736-4.
- Frontières: anthologies des Imaginales 2021 (in French). Imaginales. Saint-Laurent-d'Oingt: Mnémos. 2021. ISBN 978-2-35408-786-9.
- Et si Napoléon: treize récits d'uchronies napoléoniennes (in French). Saint-Laurent-d'Oingt: Mnémos. 2021. ISBN 978-2-35408-907-8.
- Nicot, Stéphanie; Lawson, Valérie (2022). Afrofuturisme: l'avenir change de visage. Anthologie des imaginales (in French). Saint-Laurent d'Oingt: Les éditions Mnémos. ISBN 978-2-35408-976-4.

=== Essays ===
- Guiot, Denis; Laurie, Alain; Nicot, Stéphanie; Manchu (1998). Dictionnaire de la science-fiction. Le livre de poche (in French). Paris: Hachette jeunesse. ISBN 978-2-01-321572-5.
- Augst-Merelle, Alexandra; Nicot, Stéphanie; Winckler, Martin (2006). Changer de sexe: identités transsexuelles (in French). Paris: le Cavalier bleu éd. ISBN 978-2-84670-142-6.
