= List of writers by name: V =

The following is a List of writers by name whose last names begin with V:

Abbreviations: ch = children's; d = drama, screenwriting; f = fiction; nf = non-fiction; p = poetry, song lyrics

== Va–Ve ==
- Aslaug Vaa (1889–1965, Norway, p/d)
- Lars Amund Vaage (born 1952, Norway, f/p/nf)
- Elena Văcărescu (1864–1947, Romania/France, p/f/nf)
- Andrew Vachss (1942–2021, US, f)
- Joachim Vadian (1484–1551, Switzerland/Austria, nf)
- Rachel Vail (born 1966, US, ch)
- Gertrude Vaile (1878–1954, US, nf)
- János Vajda (1827–1897, Hungary, p)
- Vakhtang VI (1675–1737, Kingdom of Kartli/Ottoman E, nf/p)
- Aline Valangin (1889–1986, Switzerland, f)
- Indrė Valantinaitė (born 1984, Soviet Union/Lithuania, p)
- Nanos Valaoritis (1921–2019, Greece/US, p/f/d)
- Eysteinn Valdason (fl. 10th c. CE, Iceland, p)
- Abraham Valdelomar (1888–1919, Peru, p/f/nf)
- Luis Valdez (born 1940, US, d)
- Mercedes Valdivieso (1924–1993, Chile, f)
- Guillermo Valencia (1873–1943, Colombia, p)
- Karl Valentin (1882–1948, Germany, nf)
- Jenny Valentine (born 1970, England/Wales, ch)
- Luisa Valenzuela (born 1938, Argentina, f/nf)
- Sinéad de Valera (1878–1975, Ireland, ch)
- Paul Valéry (1871–1945, France, p/nf)
- Lorenzo Valla (c. 1407–1457, Italy, nf)
- César Vallejo (1892–1938, Peru/France, p/d/nf)
- Fernando Vallejo (born 1942, Colombia/Mexico, f/d/nf)
- Jules Vallès (1832–1885, France, nf)
- Carl-Johan Vallgren (born 1964, Sweden, f)
- Valentine Vallis (1916–2009, Australia, p/nf)
- Jean-Pierre Vallotton (born 1955, Switzerland, p/f/ch)
- Valmiki (final BCE centuries, India, poet)
- Léonise Valois (1868–1936, Canada, p/nf)
- Jan Valtin (1905–1951, Germany/US, nf)
- Miklós Vámos (born 1950, Hungary, nf/f/d)
- Wendelin Van Draanen (born 1965, US, ch)
- Jack Vance (1916–2013, US, f)
- Josip Vandot (1884–1944, Austrian Empire/Yugoslavia, f/ch)
- Nikola Vaptsarov (1909–1942, Bulgaria, p)
- Chad Varah (1911–2007, England, nf)
- Varand (born 1954, Iran, p/d/nf), born Soukias Hacob Koorkchian
- Blanca Varela (1926–2009, Peru, p)
- Eugenio Cruz Vargas (1923–2014, Chile, p)
- Fred Vargas (born 1957, France, nf/f), pseudonym of Frédérique Audoin-Rouzeau
- Martin Vargic (born 1998, Slovakia, nf)
- Elizabeth Varley (1909–2002, England, nf), born Elizabeth Susan Douglas-Scott-Montagu
- John Varley (born 1947, US, f)
- Mahadevi Varma (1907–1987, India, p/nf/f)
- Shreekumar Varma (born 1955, India, f/d/ch)
- Karl August Varnhagen von Ense (1785–1858, Germany, nf)
- Rahel Varnhagen (1771–1833, Germany, nf)
- Dimitris Varos (1949–2017, Greece, p/nf)
- Daniel Varoujan (1884–1915, Ottoman E, p)
- M. Vasalis (1909–1998, Netherlands, p/nf), pseudonym of Margaretha Drooglever Fortuyn-Leenmans
- José Mauro de Vasconcelos (1920–1984, Brazil, f)
- Mário Cesariny de Vasconcelos (1923–2006, Portugal, poet)
- Dragiša Vasić (1885–1945, Serbia/Yugoslavia, f/nf)
- Dušan Vasiljev (1900–1924, Serbia/Yugoslavia, p/f/d)
- M. G. Vassanji (born 1950, Kenya/Canada, f/nf)
- Johann Karl Wilhelm Vatke (1806–1882, Germany, nf)
- Sachchidananda Hirananda Vatsyayana (1911–1987, India, p/f/nf), pseudonym Agyeya
- Henry Vaughan (1621–1695, Wales, p/nf)
- Hilda Vaughan (1892–1985, Wales/England, f)
- Thomas Vaux (1509–1556, England, p)
- Joana Vaz (c. 1500 – post-1570, Portugal, p)
- Vazha-Pshavela (1861–1915, Russian E, p/f/d), pseudonym of Luka Razikashvili
- Reetika Vazirani (1962–2003, India/US, p)
- Ivan Vazov (1850–1921, Bulgaria, p/f/d)
- Lourdes Vázquez (born 1950, Puerto Rico/US, f/p/nf)
- Ana Lydia Vega (born 1946, Puerto Rico, f/nf)
- Inca Garcilaso de la Vega (1539–1616, Peru/Spain, nf)
- Lope de Vega (1562–1635, Spain, d/p/f)
- Attila Végh (born 1962, Hungary, p/nf)
- Maffeo Vegio (1407–1458, Italy, p/nf)
- Manuel Veiga (born 1948, Cape Verde, nf)
- Arqueles Vela (1899–1977, Guatemala/Mexico, p/nf)
- Sonia Manzano Vela (born 1947, Ecuador, p/f)
- Lizzie Velásquez (born 1989, US, nf)
- Álvaro Velho (fl. 15th–16th c., Portugal, nf)
- Konstantin Velichkov (1855–1907, Bulgaria/France, nf)
- Vukša Veličković (born 1979, Yugoslavia/Serbia, nf/f)
- Dragan Velikić (born 1953, Yugoslavia/Serbia, f/nf)
- Nikolaj Velimirović (1881–1956, Serbia/US, nf)
- Carlos Pezoa Véliz (1879–1908, Chile, p/nf)
- Svetlana Velmar-Janković (1933–2014, Yugoslavia/Serbia, f/nf)
- Vladimir Velmar-Janković (1895–1976, Austria-Hungary/Yugoslavia, nf)
- Vemana (fl. 17th c., Andhra Pradesh, p)
- Dione Venables (1930–2023, England, f), pseudonym DG Finlay
- Fernando Venâncio (born 1944, Portugal, nf)
- Gavrilo Stefanović Venclović (c. 1680 – c. 1749, Austrian E, p/nf)
- Helen Vendler (born 1933, US, nf)
- Òscar Vendrell Corrons (1973, Spain, nf/f)
- F.A. Venter (1916–1997, S Africa, f)
- Jean Venturini (1919–1940, Tunisia/Morocco, p)
- Serge Venturini (born 1955, France, p)
- Pedro Jorge Vera (1914–1999, Ecuador, nf)
- Yvonne Vera (1964–2005, S Rhodesia/Canada, f)
- Enrique Verástegui (1950–2018, Peru, p/f/nf)
- Horacio Verbitsky (born 1942, Argentina, nf)
- Jacint Verdaguer (1845–1902, Spain, p)
- Edward de Vere (1550–1604, England, p/d)
- Cesário Verde (1855–1886, Portugal, p)
- Edward de Vere, 17th Earl of Oxford (1550–1604, England, p/d)
- Péter Veres (1897–1970, Hungary, nf)
- Giovanni Verga (1840–1922, Italy, f)
- Pedro Nolasco Cruz Vergara (1857–1939, Chile, nf/f)
- Nicolaas Vergunst (born 1958, S Africa, f)
- Émile Verhaeren (1855–1916, Belgium/France, p/nf)
- Peter Verhelst (born 1962, Belgium, p/nf/d)
- Erico Verissimo (1905–1975, Brazil/US, f)
- Jumoke Verissimo (born 1979, Nigeria, p/f)
- Luis Fernando Verissimo (born 1936, Brazil, nf/d)
- Iman Verjee (living, Kenya/Canada, f)
- Paul Verlaine (1844–1896, France, p)
- Paul Vermeersch (living, Canada, p)
- Peter Martyr Vermigli (1499–1562, Italy/Switzerland, nf)
- Jules Verne (1828–1905, France, f/p/d)
- R. V. Vernède (1905–2003, England/India, f)
- Amy Cripps Vernon (1870–1956, England, ch)
- Caroline Vernon (1908–1988, England, nf)
- David Vernon (born 1965, Australia, nf)
- Frances Vernon (1963–1991, England, f)
- Eliseo Verón (1935–2014, Argentina, nf)
- Louie Verrecchio (born 1961, US, nf)
- Halldis Moren Vesaas (1907–1995, Norway, p/ch)
- Tarjei Vesaas (1897–1970, Norway, p/f)
- Sonja Veselinović (born 1981, Yugoslavia/Serbia)
- Simon Vestdijk (1898–1971, Netherlands)
- Anne-Cath. Vestly (1920–2008, Norway, ch)
- József Vészi (1858–1940, Hungary, p/nf)
- Enn Vetemaa (1936–2017, Estonia, f/d/nf)
- Aglaja Veteranyi (1962–2002, Romania/Switzerland, f)
- Stephanie Vetter (1884–1974, Netherlands/Belgium, f)
- Veturi (1936–2010, India, p)
- Aleksije Vezilić (1753–1792, Austrian E, p)

== Vi–Vy ==
- Boris Vian (1920–1959, France, f/p/d)
- Vladimir Bulatović Vib (1931–1994, Yugoslavia, nf)
- Gil Vicente (c. 1465 – c. 1536, Portugal, d/p)
- F. B. Vickers (1903–1985, England/Australia, f)
- Salley Vickers (born 1948, England, f)
- Vincent Cartwright Vickers (1879–1939, England, nf)
- Elena Maria Vidal (born 1962, US, f/nf)
- Drífa Viðar (1920–1971, Iceland, nf/f)
- Juan José Videgain (born 1975, Spain, nf)
- Emanuil A. Vidinski (born 1978, Bulgaria, f/p)
- Milan Vidmar (1885–1962, Austrian E/Yugoslavia, nf)
- Marko Vidojković (born 1975, Yugoslavia/Serbia, f)
- Ishwar Chandra Vidyasagar (1820–1891, India, nf)
- Alice Vieira (born 1943, Portugal, ch)
- António Vieira (1608–1697, Portugal/Brazil, nf)
- Arménio Vieira (born 1941, Cape Verde, p/nf)
- José Luandino Vieira (born 1935, Angola, f), pseudonym of José Vieira Mateus da Graça
- Francis Vielé-Griffin (1864–1937, US/France, p)
- Peter Viereck (1916–2006, US, p/nf)
- Berthold Viertel (1885–1953, Austria, d)
- Vigfúss Víga-Glúmsson (fl. c. 1000 CE, Iceland, p)
- Claude Vigée (1921–2020, France/Israel, p)
- Gilles Vigneault (born 1928, Canada, p)
- Alfred de Vigny (1797–1863, France, p/f/d)
- Judit Vihar (born 1944, Hungary, nf/p)
- Vicki Viidikas (1948–1998, Australia, p/f)
- Vijayakrishnan (born 1952, India, nf/f)
- Bjørg Vik (1935–2018, Norway, f/d/nf)
- Ola Viker (1897–1972, Norway, f)
- José María Vargas Vila (1860–1933, Colombia, f/nf)
- Benedict Wallet Vilakazi (1906–1947, S Africa, f/p/nf)
- Heiki Vilep (born 1960, Estonia, p/ch/f)
- Linda Vilhjálmsdóttir (born 1958, Iceland, p/d/nf)
- Thor Vilhjálmsson (1925–2011, Scotland/Iceland, f/d/p)
- Lettie Viljoen (born 1948, S Africa, f), pseudonym of Ingrid Winterbach
- José García Villa (1908–1997, Philippines, p/nf/f)
- Rene Villanueva (1954–2007, Philippines, d/ch)
- Xavier Villaurrutia (1903–1950, Mexico, p/d/nf)
- Charles de Villers (1765–1815, France, nf)
- Christopher Villiers (born 1960, England, d)
- Phillippa Yaa de Villiers (born 1966, S Africa, p/nf)
- François Villon (c. 1431 – c. 1463, France, p)
- Juan Villoro (born 1956, Mexico, f/ch)
- Luis Villoro (1922–2014, Mexico, nf)
- Elsa G. Vilmundardóttir (1932–2008, Iceland, nf)
- Mladen Vilotijević (born 1935, Yugoslavia/Serbia, nf)
- Nada Vilotijević (born 1953, Yugoslavia/Serbia, nf)
- David Viñas (1927–2011, Argentina, d/nf/f)
- Stanislav Vinaver (1891–1955, Serbia/Yugoslavia, f/nf)
- Sherard Vines (1890–1974, England, p/f/nf)
- Joan D. Vinge (born 1948, US, f)
- Vernor Vinge (1944–2024, US, f)
- Aasmund Olavsson Vinje (1818–1870, Norway, p/nf)
- Judith Viorst (born 1931, US, p/ch)
- Elfrida Vipont (1902–1992, England, ch/nf)
- Dev Virahsawmy (1942–2023, Mauritius, d/p/f)
- Virgil (70–19 BCE, Rome/Roman E, p), full name Publius Vergilius Maro
- Elene Virsaladze (1911–1977, Russian E/USSR, nf)
- Friedrich Theodor Vischer (1807–1887, Germany/Austria, f/p/d)
- Filip Višnjić (1767–1834, Ottoman E/Austrian E, p)
- Miroslav Josić Višnjić (1946–2015, Yugoslavia/Serbia, f/p/nf)
- A.G. Visser (1878–1929, S Africa, p)
- Wayne Visser (born 1970, Rhodesia/England, nf/p)
- Roemer Visscher (1547–1620, Netherlands, p)
- Mihály Csokonai Vitéz (1773–1805, Hungary, p/d)
- Milovan Vitezović (born 1944, Yugoslavia/Serbia, nf/d)
- Mihailo Vitković (1778–1829, Hungary, p)
- Roger Vitrac (1899–1952, France, d/p)
- Vitruvius (c. 80/70 – post-15 BCE, Roman E, nf), full name Marcus Vitruvius Pollio
- Elio Vittorini (1908–1966, Italy, nf/f)
- Herbert Vivian (1865–1940, England, nf/f)
- Vincenzo Viviani (1622–1703, Italy, nf)
- Vladislav the Grammarian (fl. 1456–1479, Serbia/Bulgaria, nf)
- Ivan Vladislavić (born 1957, S Africa, f)
- Gordana Vlajić (born 1959, Yugoslavia/Serbia, p/f/ch)
- Svetozar Vlajković (born 1938, Yugoslavia/Serbia, nf/d)
- Gelu Vlașin (born 1966, Romania, p/nf)
- Charlotte Voake (born 1957, Wales/England, ch)
- Valentin Vodnik (1758–1819, Habsburg E, nf/p)
- Mato Vodopić (1816–1893, Austria-Hungary, p)
- Julius Vogel (1835–1899, N Zealand, f)
- Walther von der Vogelweide (c. 1170 – c. 1230, Holy Roman E, p)
- A. E. van Vogt (1912–2000, Canada/US, f)
- Nils Collett Vogt (1864–1937, Norway, p)
- Élise Voïart (1786–1866, France, nf/f/ch)
- Vasile Voiculescu (1884–1963, Romania, p/f/d)
- Claude-Henri de Fusée de Voisenon (1708–1775, France, d/p)
- Vincent Voiture (1597–1648, France, p/nf)
- Goran Vojnović (born 1980, Yugoslavia/Slovenia, nf/p)
- Ivo Vojnović (1857–1929, Austrian E/Yugoslavia, f/d)
- Lujo Vojnović (1864–1951, Austrian E/Yugoslavia, nf)
- Jan Erik Vold (born 1939, Norway, p/nf)
- Richard von Volkmann (1830–1889, Germany, nf/ch/p), pseudonym Richard Leander
- Voltaire (1694–1778, France, nf/f/d), pseudonym of François-Marie Arouet
- Völu-Steinn (fl. mid-10th c. CE, Iceland, p)
- Joost van den Vondel (1587–1679, Germany/Netherlands, p/d)
- Kurt Vonnegut (1922–2007, US, f/d/nf)
- Jón úr Vör (1917–2000, Iceland, p)
- Prežihov Voranc (1893–1950, Austrian E/Yugoslavia, f)
- John Vornholt (born 1951, US, f/d/ch)
- Mihály Vörösmarty (1800–1855, Hungary, p/d)
- Johann Heinrich Voss (1751–1826, Germany, p/nf)
- Christopher Voss (born 1957, US, nf)
- Richard Voss (1851–1918, Germany/Italy, d/f)
- Margaret Winifred Vowles (1882–1932, England, nf)
- Andrei Voznesensky (1933–2010, USSR/Russia, p)
- Stanko Vraz (1810–1851, Austria-Hungary, p), born Jakob Frass
- Brian Vrepont (1882–1955, Australia, p), pseudonym of Benjamin Arthur Truebridge
- Anne de Vries (1904–1964, Netherlands, f/ch)
- Theun de Vries (1907–2005, Netherlands, nf/p/f)
- Leo Vroman (1915–2014, Netherlands/US, p)
- Lazar Vučković (1937–1966, Serbia/Yugoslavia, p)
- Éric Vuillard (born 1968, France, f/nf)
- Prvoslav Vujcic (born 1960, Canada, nf/p)
- Joakim Vujić (1772–1847, Habsburg E/Serbia, nf/f/d)
- Dušan Vukajlović (1948–1994, Yugoslavia, p)
- Divna M. Vuksanović (born 1965, Yugoslavia/Serbia, nf)
- Mircea Vulcănescu (1904–1952, Romania, nf)
- Nikola Vulić (1872–1945, Ottoman E/Yugoslavia, nf)
- Christian August Vulpius (1762–1827, Germany, f/d)
- Seita Vuorela (1971–2015, Finland, ch)
- Vyasa (undated, India, p), full name Krishna Dvaipayana
- Vydūnas (1868–1953, E Prussia/Germany, p/nf), pseudonym of Wilhelm Storost
