= Elbakin.net =

French fantasy website

- Available in: French
- Headquarters: {{{location_country}}}
- Website: http://www.elbakin.net
- Commercial: No
- Launched: 2000
- Current status: Active

Elbakin.net is a French website created in 2000, dealing with fantasy in all media (books, illustrations, comic books, films, TV fictions, games). It is one of the main Francophone information websites dedicated to the fantasy genre. Since 2006, the main contributors to the website formed an eponymous association (under France's 1901 law on associations) which manages the website and undertakes cultural actions in the same field.

== History ==
In early September 2000, three fantasy lovers, namely Raphaël Cervera, Jean-François le Gac and Emmanuel Chastellière, launched a website, Elbakin.com, resulting from the merger of their individual websites. At that time, Elbakin.net was mainly dedicated to the universe of The Lord of the Rings and its film adaptation by Peter Jackson, then in production, and the website made itself known by relaying information about the film adaptation. After the release of the trilogy, the website was dedicated to all aspects of fantasy.

In April 2001, a new version of the website was published online. In April 2002, Elbakin.net renewed its forum by setting up a phpBB engine to deal with the increase in Internet traffic.

In September 2003, the website replaced its domain name and became Elbakin.net. In 2004, the permanent editorial board of the website changed: Emmanuel Chastellière was the only remaining active founding member, and several new editors joined the team.

In 2006, Elbakin.net became a voluntary association under France's 1901 law. Its aim is to promote the fantasy genre, mainly with the website Elbakin.net but also by other means, especially participation in festivals.

In February 2009, the website opened a Facebook page.

In June 2009, Elbakin.net took part in two study days organised by the Paris 13 University about fantasy in France with the participation of an editor of the website in a round table.

In 2010, Elbakin.net organised France's first Fantasy convention in Grenoble from 26 to 29 August, alongside the 37th Science Fiction convention. On that occasion a fantasy literary award was introduced: the Elbakin.net Award.

In September 2010, the website celebrated the tenth anniversary of its founding, and on this special occasion published words of encouragement from several well-known figures in French fantasy, including the authors Alain Damasio, Pierre Pevel, Jean-Philippe Jaworski and Fabrice Colin, and academics like Vincent Ferré.

At Christmas 2010, the website launched a podcast as a series of monthly programmes featuring a review of the past year and reviews of books and films. The first series included eight programmes published online between Christmas 2010 and July 2011, and continued over the following months.

== Elbakin.net Award ==
=== French novel ===
==== 2017 ====
- Winner: Lionel Davoust : La Messagère du Ciel
- Shortlisted:
  - Pierre Bordage : La Désolation (série Arkane)
  - Jean-Laurent Del Soccoro : Boudicca
  - Estelle Faye : Les Seigneurs de Bohen
  - Victor Fleury : L'Empire électrique

==== 2016 ====
- Winner: Fabien Clavel : Feuillets de cuivre
- Shortlisted:
  - Stefan Platteau : Dévoreur
  - Anthelme Hauchecorne : Le Carnaval aux corbeaux
  - Christian Chavassieux : Les Nefs de Pangée
  - Lionel Davoust : Port d' mes

==== 2015 ====
- Winner: Jean-Laurent Del Socorro : Royaume de vent et de colères
- Shortlisted:
  - Gabriel Katz : Aeternia, la marche du prophète (série Aeternia)
  - Martin Page : Je suis un dragon
  - Lionel Davoust : La Route de la conquête
  - Nicolas Le Breton : Les mes envolées

==== 2014 ====
- Winner: Karim Berrouka : Fées, Weed et Guillotines
- Shortlisted:
  - Fabien Cerutti : Le Bâtard de Kosigan
  - Stefan Platteau : Manesh (série Les Sentiers des astres)
  - Jean-Philippe Jaworski : Même pas mort (série Rois du monde)
  - Adrien Tomas : Notre-Dame des loups

==== 2013 ====
- Winner: Estelle Faye : Porcelaine
- Shortlisted:
  - Jean-Philippe Depotte : Le Chemin des Dieux
  - Pierre Pevel : Le Chevalier (série Haut-Royaume)
  - Régis Goddyn : Le Sang des 7 rois (série Le Sang des 7 rois)
  - Olivier Peru : Martyrs (Série Martyrs)

==== 2012 ====
- Winner: Justine Niogret : Mordre le bouclier (série Chien du heaume)
- Shortlisted:
  - David Calvo : Elliot du Néant
  - Cédric Ferrand : Wastburg
  - Laurent Kloetzer : Petites Morts
  - Michel Pagel : Le Dernier des Francs

==== 2011 ====
- Winner: Thierry Di Rollo : Bankgreen (série Bankgreen)
- Shortlisted:
  - Raphaël Albert : Avant le déluge (série Les Extraordinaires et Fantastiques Enquêtes de Sylvio Sylvain, détective privé)
  - Fabien Clavel : Le Châtiment des flèches
  - Fabrice Colin & Michael Moorcock : Les Buveurs d'âme (Série Elric)
  - Laurent Kloetzer : Cleer, une fantaisie corporate

==== 2010 ====
- Winner: Charlotte Bousquet : Cytheriae (série L'Archipel des numinées)
- Shortlisted:
  - Ugo Bellagamba : Tancrède, une uchronie
  - Lionel Davoust : La Volonté du dragon
  - Christophe Lambert : Vegas mytho
  - Justine Niogret : Chien du heaume (série Chien du heaume)

=== French novel for young people ===
==== 2017 ====
- Winner: Delphine Laurent : Le lien du faucon
- Shortlisted:
  - Marine Carteron : Génération K
  - Marie-Lorna Vaconsin : La fille aux cheveux rouges
  - Ruberto Sanquer : L'aura noire
  - Charlotte Bousquet : Sang-de-lune

==== 2016 ====
- Winner: Aurélie Wellenstein : Les Loups chantants
- Shortlisted:
  - Marie Vareille : Elia, la passeuse d'âmes
  - Amandine Labarre et Nicolas Labarre : L'Autre Herbier
  - Lucie Pierrat-Pajot : Les Mystères de Larispem
  - Paul Beorn : Un ogre en cavale

==== 2015 ====
- Winner: Estelle Faye : Thya (série La Voie des oracles)
- Shortlisted:
  - Timothée de Fombelle : Le Livre de perle
  - Aurélie Wellenstein : Le Roi des fauves
  - Cassandra O'Donnell : La Vallée magique (série Malenfer)
  - B.F. Parry : Oniria - Le Royaume des rêves

==== 2014 ====
- Winner: Christelle Dabos : Les Fiancés de l’hiver
- Shortlisted:
  - Victor Dixen : Animale
  - François Place : Angel, l’indien blanc
  - Joann Sfar : GrandClapier
  - Cindy Van Wilder : Les Outrepasseurs

==== 2013 ====
- Winner: Marie Pavlenko : La Fille-sortilège
- Shortlisted:
  - Pauline Bock : Les Lumières de Haven
  - Hervé Jubert : Magies secrètes
  - Carole Trébor : Nina Volkovitch
  - Fabrice Colin : 49 jours (série La Dernière Guerre)

==== 2012 ====
- Winner: Jean-Luc Marcastel : L'Enfant-monstre (série La Geste d'Alban)
- Shortlisted:
  - Charlotte Bousquet : Nuits tatouées (série La Peau des rêves)
  - Nicolas Cluzeau : Avant les ténèbres (série Chroniques de la mort blanche)
  - Gabriel Katz : La Traque (série Le Puits des mémoires)
  - Christophe Mauri : Le Premier Défi de Mathieu Hidalf

==== 2011 ====
- Winner: Olivier Peru et Patrick McSpare : La Voix des rois (série Les Hauts-Conteurs)
- Shortlisted:
  - Marie Caillet : Allégeance (série L'Héritage des Darcer)
  - Vincent Jouvert : La Roue du vent
  - Guilhem Méric : Le Secret des âmes sœurs (série Myrihandes)
  - Carina Rozenfeld : Les Portes de Doregon (série Doregon)

==== 2010 ====
- Winner: Pauline Alphen : Salicande (série Les Éveilleurs)
- Shortlisted:
  - Samantha Bailly : La Langue du silence (série Au-delà de l'oraison)
  - Pierre Bottero : Les mes croisées
  - Charlotte Bousquet : La Marque de la bête
  - Jérôme Noirez : La Dernière Flèche

=== Foreign novel ===
==== 2017 ====
- Winner: Guy Gavriel Kay : Le Fleuve Céleste
- Shortlisted:
  - Angélica Gorodischer : Kalpa Impérial
  - Ekaterina Sedia : L'Alchimie de la Pierre
  - Emmi Itaranta : La Cité des méduses
  - Aliette de Bodard : La Chute de la Maison aux Flèches d'Argent

==== 2016 ====
- Winner: Hope Mirrless : Lud-en-Brume
- Shortlisted:
  - Hélene Wecker : La Femme d'argile et l'Homme de feu
  - Sofia Samatar : Un étranger en Olondre
  - Marie Brennan : Une histoire naturelle des dragons
  - Guy Gavriel Kay : Ysabel

==== 2015 ====
- Winner: Guy Gavriel Kay : Les Chevaux célestes
- Shortlisted:
  - Graham Joyce : Comme un conte
  - Brandon Sanderson : La Voie des rois (série Les Archives de Roshar)
  - Kazuo Ishiguro : Le Géant enfoui
  - Poul Anderson : L'Épée brisée

==== 2014 ====
- Winner: Catherynne M. Valente : Immortel
- Shortlisted:
  - Miles Cameron : Le Chevalier rouge (série Renégat)
  - Jo Walton : Morwenna
  - Nnedi Okorafor : Qui a peur de la mort ?
  - Dan O'Malley : The Rook, au service surnaturel de sa majesté

==== 2013 ====
- Winner: Patrick Rothfuss : La Peur du sage (série Chronique du tueur de roi)
- Shortlisted:
  - G. Willow Wilson : Alif l'Invisible
  - Glen Duncan : Le Dernier Loup-garou
  - Larry Correia : Malédiction (série Les Chroniques du Grimnoir)
  - Joe Abercrombie : Servir Froid

==== 2012 ====
- Winner: China Miéville : The City and the City
- Shortlisted:
  - Ben Aaronovitch : Les Rivières de Londres (série Le Dernier Apprenti Sorcier)
  - Joe Hill : Cornes
  - Richard Kadrey : Butcher Bird
  - Lucius Shepard : Le Dragon Griaule

==== 2011 ====
- Winner: N. K. Jemisin : Les Cent Mille Royaumes (série Trilogie de l'Héritage)
- Shortlisted:
  - Anne Bishop : Fille de sang (série Les Joyaux noirs)
  - Jay Lake : Jade
  - Martin Millar : Kalix, le loup-garou solitaire
  - Chris Wooding : Frey (Série Frey)

==== 2010 ====
- Winner: Brandon Sanderson : L'Empire ultime (série Fils-des-Brumes)
- Shortlisted:
  - Jacqueline Carey : L'Avatar (série Kushiel)
  - Stephen Deas : Le Palais adamantin (série Les Rois-dragons)
  - Kate Elliott : Le Dragon du roi (série La Couronne d'étoiles)
  - Ken Scholes : Lamentations (série Les Psaumes d'Issak)

=== Foreign novel for young people ===
==== 2017 ====
- Winner: Maria Turtschaninoff : Maresi
- Shortlisted:
  - Stéphanie Garber : Caraval
  - Alison Goodman : Lady Helen : Le club des Mauvais Jours
  - Irena Brignull : Les sorcières du clan du Nord
  - Lian Hearn : L'Enfant du cerf (série Shikanoko)

==== 2016 ====
- Winner: Sabaa Tahir : Une braise sous la cendre
- Shortlisted:
  - Catherynne M. Valente : La Fille qui navigua autour de Féérie dans un bateau construit de ses propres mains
  - S. E. Grove : Les Cartographes - La Sentence de verre
  - Neil Gaiman : Par bonheur le lait
  - Leigh Bardugo : Six of Crows

==== 2015 ====
- Winner: Holly Black et Cassandra Clare : L'Épreuve de fer (série Le Magisterium)
- Shortlisted:
  - P.D. Baccalario : La Boutique Vif-Argent
  - Soman Chainani : L'École du bien et du mal
  - Lisa Fiedler : L'Empire d'Atlantia (série La Guerre des mus)
  - Amber Argyle : Witch Song (série Witch Song)

==== 2014 ====
- Winner: Gail Carriger : Étiquette et Espionnage (série Le Pensionnat de Melle Geraldine)
- Shortlisted:
  - Brandon Sanderson : Cœur d’acier
  - Polly Shulman : La Malédiction Grimm
  - Terry Pratchett : Le Monde merveilleux du caca (série Les Annales du Disque-Monde)
  - Andrew Prentice et Jonathan Weil: Magie noire

==== 2013 ====
- Winner: Leigh Bardugo : Les Orphelins du royaume (série Grisha)
- Shortlisted:
  - Colin Meloy : Les Chroniques de Wildwood (série Les Chroniques de Wildwood)
  - Licia Troisi : La Fille dragon
  - Kathryn Littlewood : La Pâtisserie Bliss (série La Pâtisserie Bliss)
  - Maggie Stiefvater : Sous le signe du scorpion

==== 2012 ====
- Winner: Patrick Ness : Quelques minutes après minuit
- Shortlisted:
  - Jasper Fforde : Moi, Jennifer Strange, dernière tueuse de dragon (série Jennifer Strange)
  - Kai Meyer : La Soie et l'Épée (série Le Peuple des nuées)
  - Eric Nylund : Le Pacte des immortels (série Le Pacte des immortels)
  - Jonathan Stroud : L'Anneau de Salomon (série Bartimeus)

==== 2011 ====
- Winner: Scott Westerfeld : Léviathan (série Leviathan)
- Shortlisted:
  - Steve Augarde : Le Peuple des minuscules (série Touchstone)
  - Kathleen Duey : L'Épreuve (série Le Prix de la magie)
  - Cornelia Funke : Le Sortilège de pierre (série Reckless)
  - Ursula K. Le Guin : Pouvoirs (série Chroniques des rivages de l'Ouest)

==== 2010 ====
- Winner: China Miéville : Lombres
- Shortlisted:
  - John Connoly : Le Livre des choses perdues
  - Kami Garcia & Margaret Stohl : 16 Lunes (série Le Livre des Lunes)
  - Alison Goodman : Eon et le Douzième Dragon
  - Diana Wynne Jones : Les Sortilèges de la guiterne (série L'Odyssée Dalemark)

=== Multiple nominees ===
==== Multiple winners ====
(minimum 2)

- China Miéville : 2
  - 2010 : Lombres (roman étranger pour la jeunesse)
  - 2012 : The City and the City (roman étranger)
- Estelle Faye : 2
  - 2013 : Porcelaine (roman français)
  - 2015 : Thya (série La Voie des oracles) (roman français pour la jeunesse)
- Guy Gavriel Kay : 2
  - 2015 : Les Chevaux célestes (roman étranger)
  - 2017 : Le Fleuve céleste (roman étranger)

==== Nominations ====
(minimum 3)

- Charlotte Bousquet : 4
  - French novel : 2010
  - French novel for young people : 2010, 2012, 2017
- Lionel Davoust : 4
  - French novel : 2010, 2015, 2016 et 2017
- Brandon Sanderson : 3
  - Foreign novel : 2010, 2015
  - Foreign novel for young people : 2014
- Estelle Faye : 3
  - French novel : 2013, 2017
  - French novel for young people : 2015
- Guy Gavriel Kay : 3
  - Foreign novel : 2015, 2016, 2017
