= Lucie Chenu =

French writer (born 1960)

- Born: 10 May 1960 (age 66)
- Occupation: Author
- Writing career
- Language: French

Lucie Chenu (born 10 May 1960) is a French author who works in the field of fantastic literature, fantasy and science fiction. A doctor in bacterial genetics, she received the Bob Morane Prize twice (2008 and 2009) for her work as an anthologist.

== Life and career ==
For several years, Chenu had been active in professional publishing as well as in fanzinats and webzines. She co-directed the Imaginaires collection from Glyphe editions from 2007 to 2009, when she resigned to devote herself to her own writing. However, as she is seemingly unable to stay away for very long from promoting the genres to which she has always devoted herself, Chenu was responsible for French-language fiction at the Mythologica magazine from its creation in 2012 until at the end of the review, and she has collaborated with the review Galaxies since 2013. In addition, she was part of the office of the Syndicat des écrivains de langue française (Union of French Language Writers ) as an editor from 2014 to 2015.

In 2022, she protested against the eviction of Stéphanie Nicot from the festival Les imaginales by publishing a letter of support for Nicot with other authors among whom Floriane Soulas, Silène Edgar, Sylvie Lainé, Ïan Larue, Estelle Faye, Sara Doke, Sylvie Denis, Robin Hobb, Sarah Buschmann, Charlotte Bousquet and Anne Besson.

== Bibliography ==
Novels

- Les Enfants de Svetambre (2010)
- Les Fantasmes de Svetambre (2014)

Anthologies

- (Pro)Créations (2007)
- Contes de villes et de fusées (2010)
- De Brocéliande en Avalon (2008)
- Et d'Avalon à Camelot (2012)
- Identités (2009)
- Passages (2010)
- Univers & Chimères n° 1: la Musique (2004)
