= Sara Doke =

French SF writer and translator

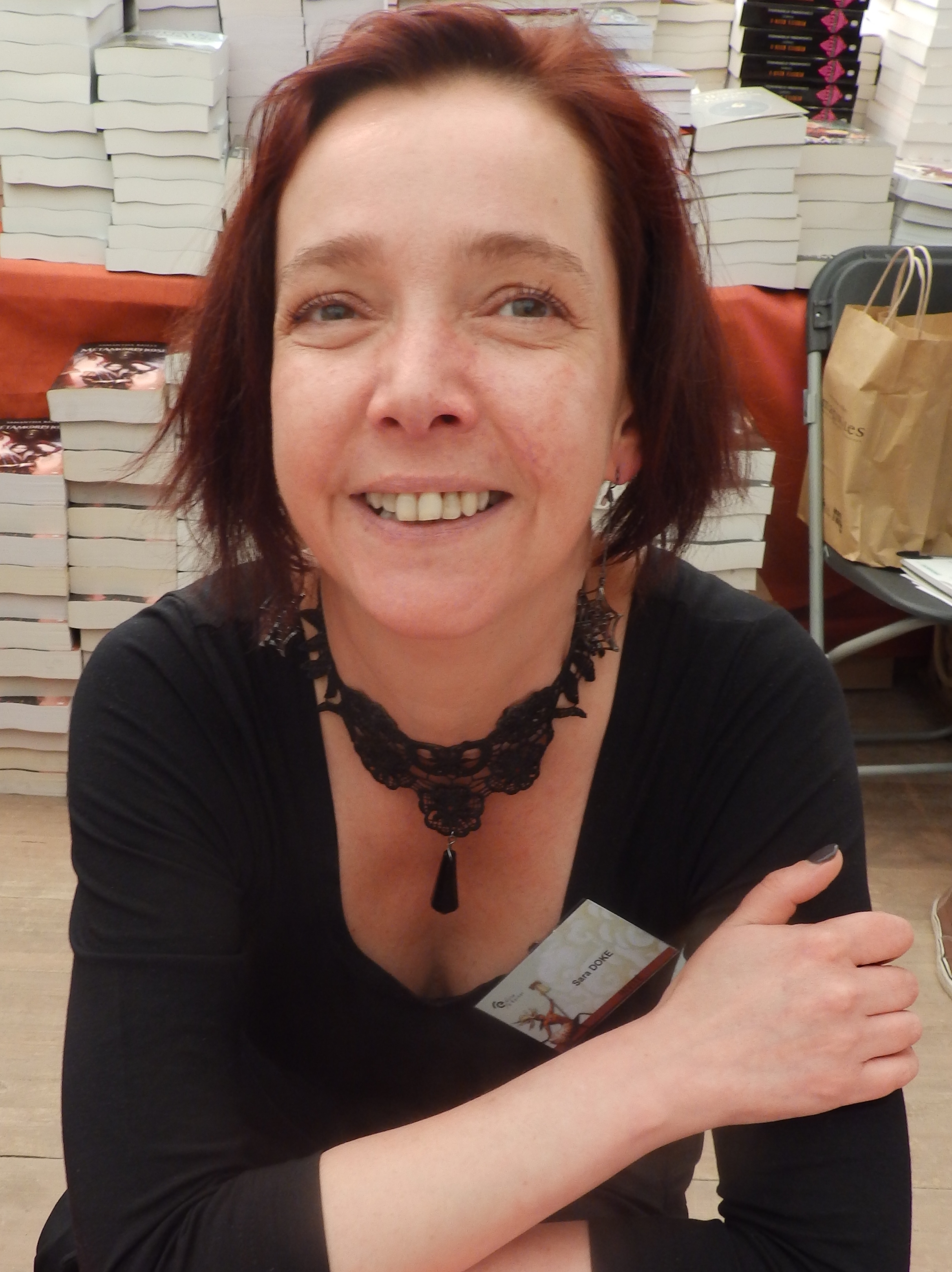
- Born: 1968 (age 57–58); France
- Occupations: Science fiction writer and translator, journalist

Sara Doke is a Belgian journalist, translator and author of science fiction and fantasy who is also an activist engaged for authors' rights.

== Biography ==
Sara Doke is the daughter of visual artist and feminist activist for women artists Micheline Doke (1931–2021).

Trained as a journalist, Sara Doke is also a digital publisher and organiser of cultural events related to fantasy and Imaginary as well as an active advocate for authors rights. She is president of honour of the Syndicat des écrivains de langue française(SELF). She went to court with her husband Ayerdahl, also an SF writer, representing authors against the RELIre digitisation and commercialisation project of unavailable books of the twentieth century. She organised the 2003 Convention nationale française de science-fiction in Flemalle and helped to organise the Imaginaire festival in Brussels, at the Maison du livre from 1999 to 2002.

She chairs the jury for the Prix Julia-Verlanger awarded each year at the Utopiales festival in Nantes.

She translates fantasy albums and English-language novels published throughout the world. She won the Grand prix de l'Imaginaire in 2013 for her translation of The Windup Girl in French by Paolo Bacigalupi.

== Science-fiction féministe ==
For Sara Doke, the most important feminist science fiction novels are Ann Leckie's Ancillary Justice and Becky Chambers's The Long Way to a Small, Angry Planet. She also pays tribute to Joëlle Wintrebert, affirming that without her ‘there wouldn't be many female SF authors in France’. Doke cites Les Olympiades truquées, Le Créateur chimérique and Les Amazones de Bohême as books from Wintreberg having left their mark on her.

In 2015, she published her first feminist science fiction novel, Techno faérie, with Les Moutons électriques. Using numerous documents and illustrations, the author paints a portrait of the 88 main fairies in the collective imagination, integrating them into technological society. In a second book, L'autre moitié du ciel (The other half of the sky), published in 2019, she proposes an inventory of women's imaginary heritage.

In 2020, along with Sylvie Denis, she was one of two guests at the French National Science Fiction Convention.

== Activism ==
In 2012, she was elected president of the Syndicat des écrivains de langue française along with Christian Vilà. However, in 2013, she stepped down from the presidency in favour of Jeanne-A Debats, retaining the honorary presidency. Alongside Ayerdhal, who died in 2015, she took a stand against the abuses of the ReLIRE project, and in November 2016 succeeded in having the project condemned by the Court of Justice of the European Union.

In 2022 she protested against the eviction of Stéphanie Nicot from the festival Les imaginales by publishing a letter of support for Nicot with other authors among whom Floriane Soulas, Silène Edgar, Sylvie Lainé, Ïan Larue, Estelle Faye, Robin Hobb, Sylvie Denis, Lucie Chenu, Sarah Buschmann, Charlotte Bousquet and Anne Besson.

== Works ==
=== Novels ===
- Techno Faerie, Les Moutons électriques, collection « La Bibliothèque voltaïque », 2015 ISBN 2-36183-233-X.
- L'Autre Moitié du ciel, Mu, 2019.
- La Complainte de Foranza, Leha, 2020.

=== Anthologies ===
- Fata Morgana, short story in Et d'Avalon à Camelot directed by Lucie Chenu, 2012
- Grands Peintres féeriques, Les Moutons Électriques, ISBN 2-36183-412-X. 2022

=== Translations ===
- La Cité de pierre, George R. R. Martin, Bifrost, 2003, in Les Rois des sables, J'ai lu, 2007 ISBN 978-2-290-35619-7.
- Gears of War – Tome 1 : Aspho Fields, Karen Traviss, Milady, 448p, 2009 ISBN 2-8112-0187-4.
- Kate Daniels – Tome 1 : Morsure magique, Ilona Andrews, Milady, 352p, 2009 ISBN 2-8112-0084-3.
- Kate Daniels – Tome 2 : Brûlure magique, Ilona Andrews, Milady, 352p, 2009 ISBN 2-8112-0144-0.
- Kate Daniels – Tome 3 : Attaque magique, Ilona Andrews, Milady, 352p, 2010 ISBN 2-8112-0299-4.
- Greg Mandel – Tome 2 : Quantum, Peter F. Hamilton, Milady, 512p, 2010 ISBN 2-8112-0414-8.
- Lila Black – Tome 1 : Bienvenue en Otopia, Justina Robson, Milady, 480p, 2010 ISBN 2-8112-0348-6.
- Lila Black – Tome 2 : Ascenseur pour Démonia, Justina Robson, Milady, 480p, 2010 ISBN 2-8112-0365-6.
- Lila Black – Tome 3 : Destination Faerie, Justina Robson, Milady, 480p, 2010 ISBN 978-2-8112-0381-8.
- Greg Mandel – Tome 3 : Nano, Peter F. Hamilton, Milady, 2011 ISBN 978-2-8112-0635-2.
- La Fille automate, Paolo Bacigalupi, Au diable Vauvert, 2012 ISBN 978-2-84626-384-9.
- Ferrailleurs des mers, Paolo Bacigalupi, Au diable Vauvert, 2013 ISBN 978-2-84626-504-1.
- Les Cités englouties, Paolo Bacigalupi, Au diable Vauvert, 2013 ISBN 978-2-84626-773-1.
- Zombie Ball, Paolo Bacigalupi, Au diable Vauvert, 2014 ISBN 978-2-84626-805-9.
- L'Alchimiste de Khaim, Paolo Bacigalupi, Au diable Vauvert, 2014 ISBN 978-2-84626-806-6.
- Water Knife, Paolo Bacigalupi, Au diable Vauvert, 2016 ISBN 979-10-307-0068-8.
- L'Arche de Darwin, James Morrow, Au diable Vauvert, 2017 ISBN 979-10-307-0115-9.
- Théâtre des dieux, Matt Suddain, Au diable Vauvert, 2017 ISBN 979-10-307-0101-2.
- Machine de guerre, Paolo Bacigalupi, Au diable Vauvert, 2018 ISBN 979-10-307-0198-2.
