= Sylvie Denis =

French science fiction writer (born 1963)

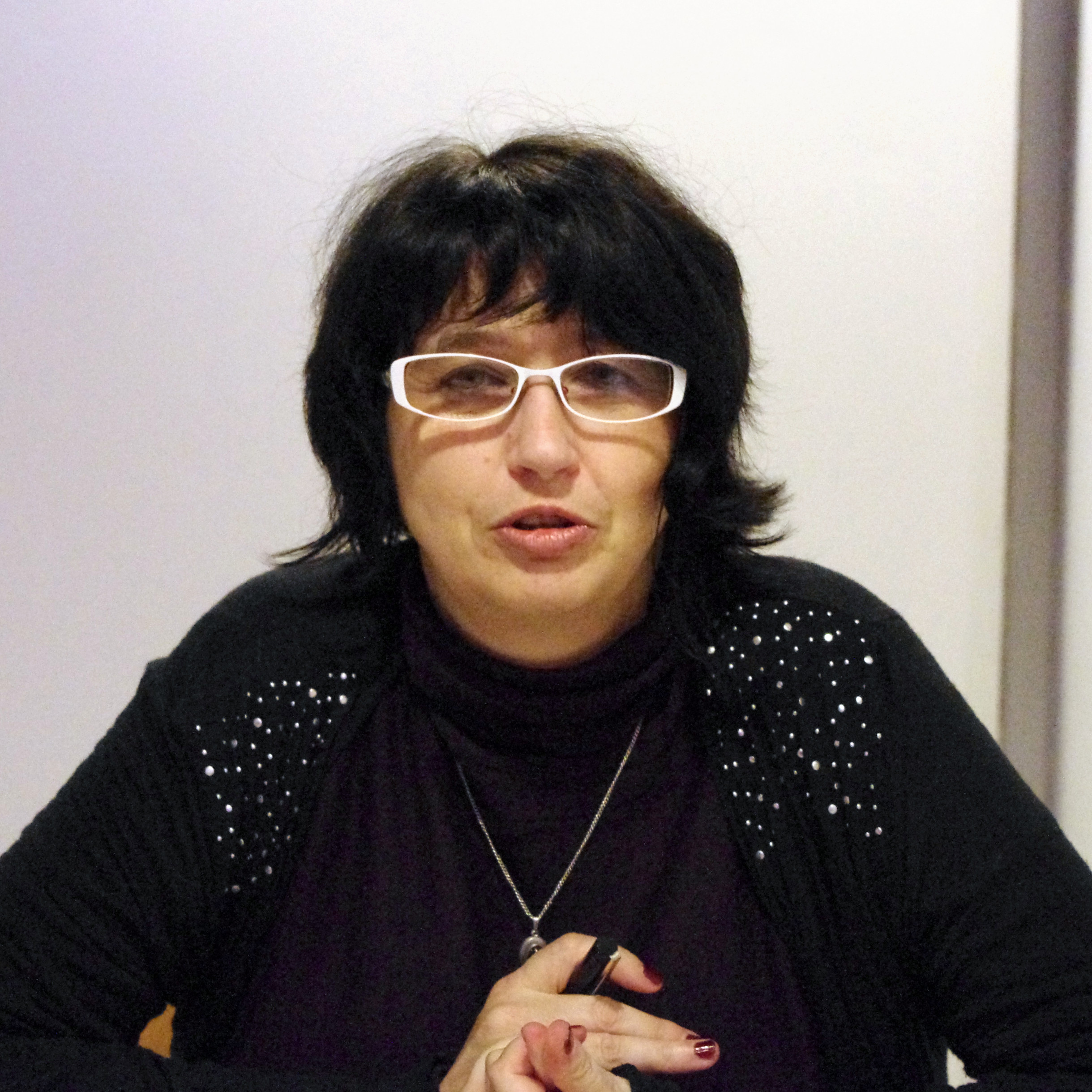
- Born: 10 November 1963 (age 61); Talence, France
- Occupation: novelist

Sylvie Denis (born 10 November 1963 in Talence) is a French science fiction writer. She is also a translator and co-edited the magazine "Cyberdreams."

A novelist, she won the Solaris Prize in 1988 for L'Anniversaire de Caroline, the Prix Rosny aîné in 2000 for Dedans, dehors and the Julia-Verlanger Prize in 2004 for Haute-École. She is also an essayist, critic, anthologist, translator and editor of Cyberdreams. She is considered by critics to be an important figure of French science fiction, both because of her many activities in the field and because of her commitment to science fiction that places great emphasis on the technosciences and their impact on human society.

== Biography ==
Sylvie Denis was born into a modest family in Saint-Gaudens, who moved to Ussel when she was eight. She became interested in science fiction at an early age, first through a television series, then by discovering the books in the Fleuve Noir Anticipation collection.

Her first works appeared in the late 1980s. Her short story L'Anniversaire de Caroline won the Solaris Prize in 1988 and was included in her first collection, Jardins virtuels, in 1995.

In 1993, she was transferred to the Lycée Jean Monnet in Cognac, and settled there.

In the mid-1990s, she co-founded the magazine Cyberdreams, which won the Grand Prix de l'Imaginaire in 1996, and was sole editor-in-chief for the last two issues. She made a major contribution to Greg Egan's reputation in France. Her anthologies include Escales 2001, which brings together the best of French SF.

She also published a number of short stories during this period, and is regarded as an exceptional novelist. She won the Prix Rosny aîné in 2000 for Dedans, dehors. Her collection Jardins virtuels was republished in 2003 by Gallimard in a much expanded version (thirteen short stories instead of five). It was hailed by the critics; Bifrost and ActuSF referred to Sylvie Denis as a ‘grande dame’ of French science fiction.

In 2002, she gave up teaching to make a living from her writing.

In 2013, a few months after an accident on the RN10 that claimed the life of her partner Roland C. Wagner and left her injured, Sylvie Denis left Cognac, where she had spent 20 years, for the Gers region.

In 2022 she protested against the eviction of Stéphanie Nicot from the festival Les imaginales by publishing a letter of support for Nicot with other authors among whom Floriane Soulas, Silène Edgar, Sylvie Lainé, Ïan Larue, Estelle Faye, Sara Doke, Robin Hobb, Lucie Chenu, Sarah Buschmann, Charlotte Bousquet and Anne Besson.

== Selected works ==
- Jardins virtuels Pézilla-la-Rivière: DLM, c1995.(1995) ISBN 2-87795-069-7
