= Sylvie Lainé =

French science-fiction writer (born 1957)

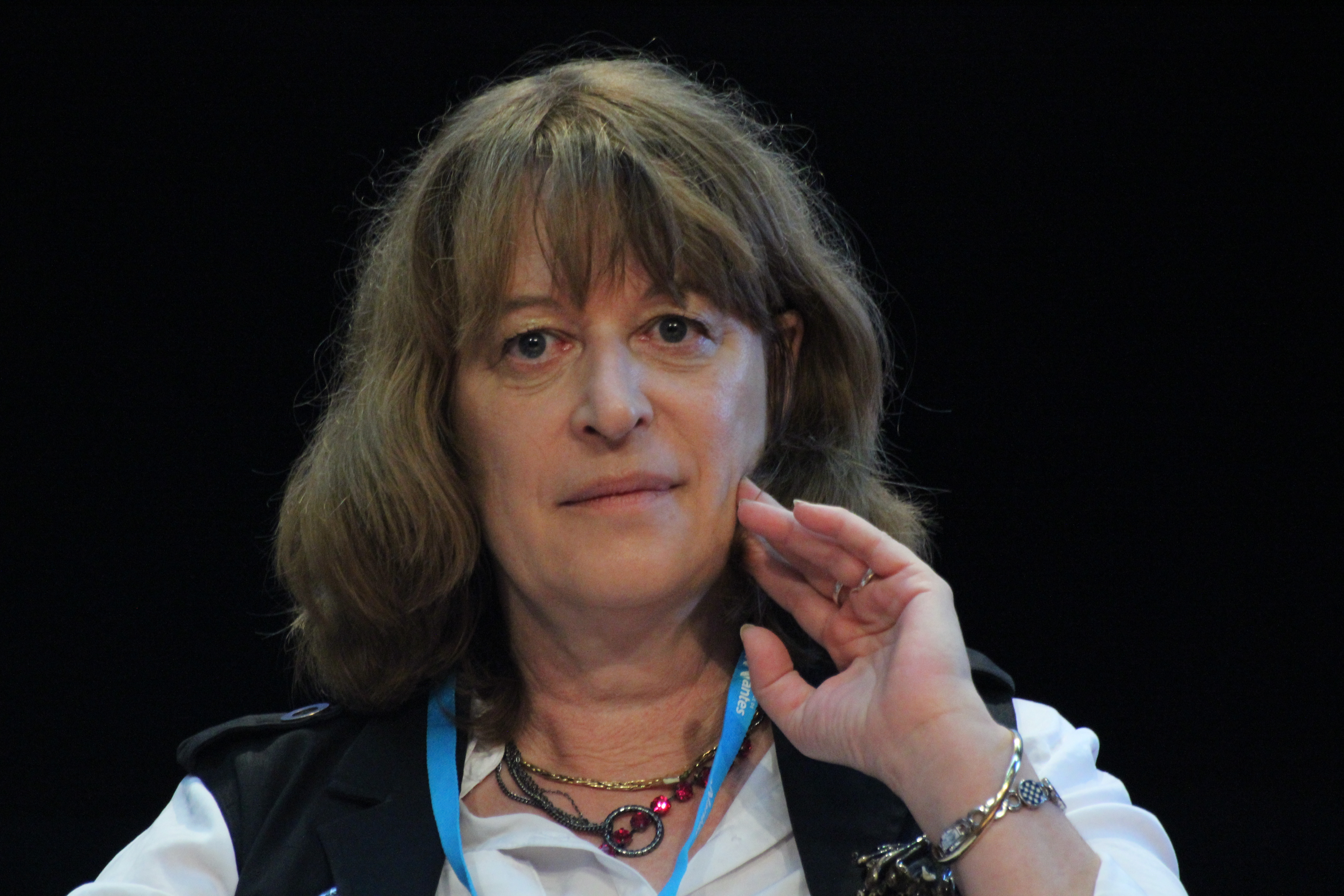
Sylvie Lainé in 2014

Sylvie Lainé (born June 29, 1957) is a French science-fiction writer. Sylvie Lainé won a Grand Prix de l'Imaginaire in 2006.

== Activism ==
In 2022 Sylvie Lainé protested against the eviction of Stéphanie Nicot from the festival Les imaginales by publishing a letter of support for Nicot with other authors among whom Ïan Larue, Floriane Soulas, Silène Edgar, Robin Hobb, Estelle Faye, Sara Doke, Sylvie Denis, Lucie Chenu, Sarah Buschmann, Charlotte Bousquet and Anne Besson.

== Nouvelles ==
- La ballade de Johny Gueux, Les Lames Vorpales n°1B, novembre 1984, et Hors Service n° 5, 1999.
- L'écrivain, Les Lames Vorpales n°2, December 1984.
- Le meyeur des mondes, Les Lames Vorpales n°2, December 1984.
- Un cahier de 280 minutes, (with Markus Leicht), Les Lames Vorpales n°2, December 1984.
- Partenaires, Les Lames Vorpales n°2, December 1984, et Univers 85, J'Ai Lu.
- Le cycle de Joclin (5 stories), Les Lames Vorpales n°2, December 1984.
- Un remède à la solitude, Les Lames Vorpales n°3, January 1985.
- Brume, Les Lames Vorpales n°5, avril 1985.
- Le Chemin de la Rencontre, SFère 22, May–June 1985, Winner of the Prix Rosny-Aîné for short fiction in 1986. Réédité dans Yellow Submarine n°116, Septembre 1995.
- Question de mode, Les Lames Vorpales n°7, September 1985.
- Thérapie douce, Le Monde dimanche, du 6 October 1985.
- Un rêve d'herbe, Les Lames Vorpales n°10, January 1987, in the anthology "Un oeil au cœur (The Eye of the Heart), CCL Éditions, Grenoble, (1987).
- Carte Blanche, Imagine... 35, August 1986, et Magie Rouge 15, 1987, prix Septième Continent 1986.
- Le passe plaisir, Yellow Submarine n°116, September 1995.
- Dérapages,(1995)
- Définissez : priorités, in the anthology Escales 2001, Fleuve Noir, (2000).
- La Mirotte, Etoiles Vives n°9, (2002).
- Un Signe de Setty, Galaxies 24, March 2002, Winner of the Prix Rosny-Aîné.
- La bulle d'Euze, Revue Galaxies n° 29, 2003.
- Les yeux d'Elsa, Revue Galaxies n° 37, 2005, Winner of the Prix Rosny-Aîné for short fiction in 2006 and the 2007 Grand Prix de l'Imaginaire.
