= Estelle Faye =

French SF writer

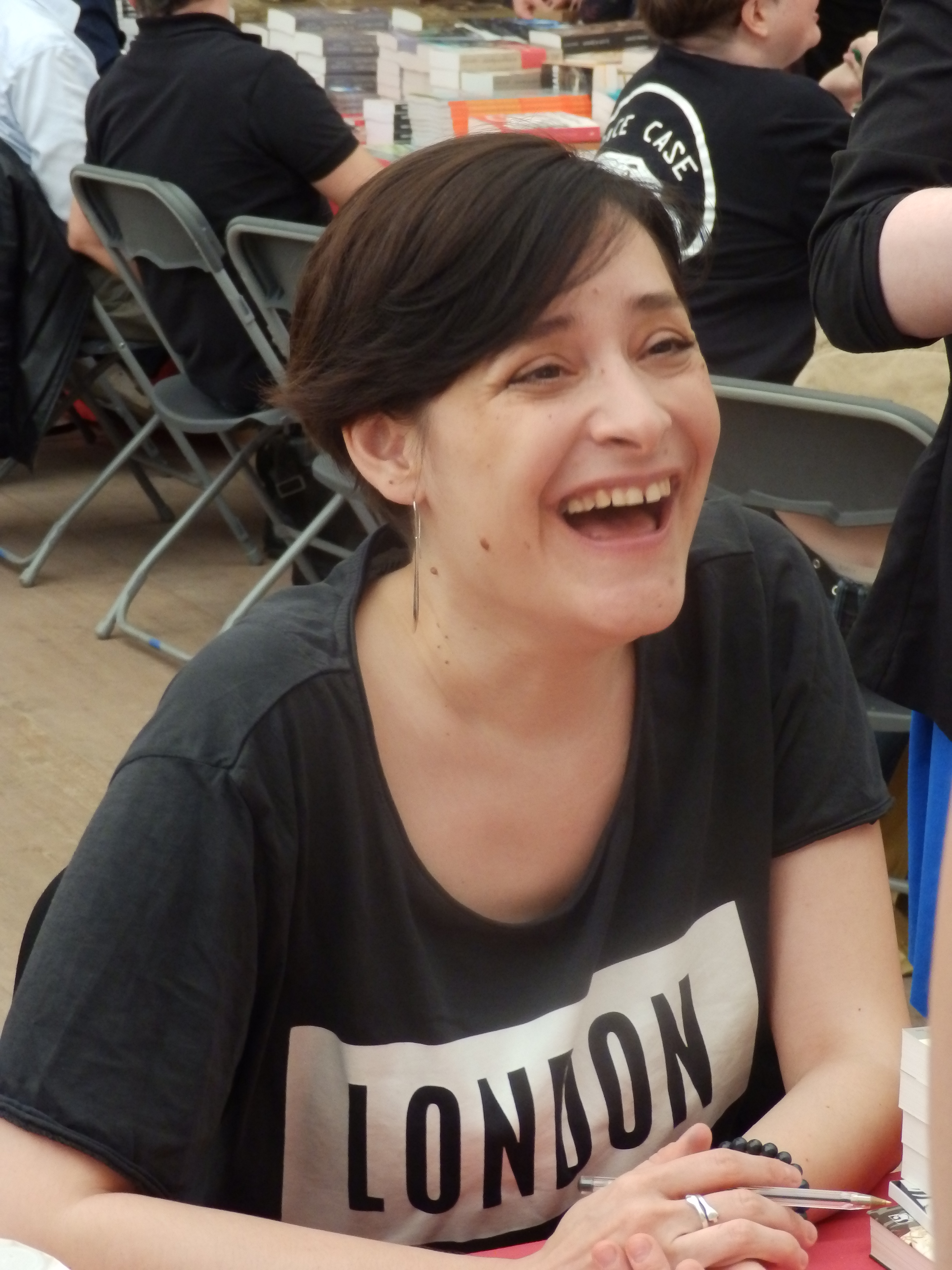
- Born: 1 May 1978
- Occupation(s): writer, actress, screenwriter

Estelle Faye (born 1 May 1978) began her career as a French actor and screenwriter. Since 2009 she has been best known as a science fiction and fantasy author, where her novels and short stories have won several awards.

== Biography ==
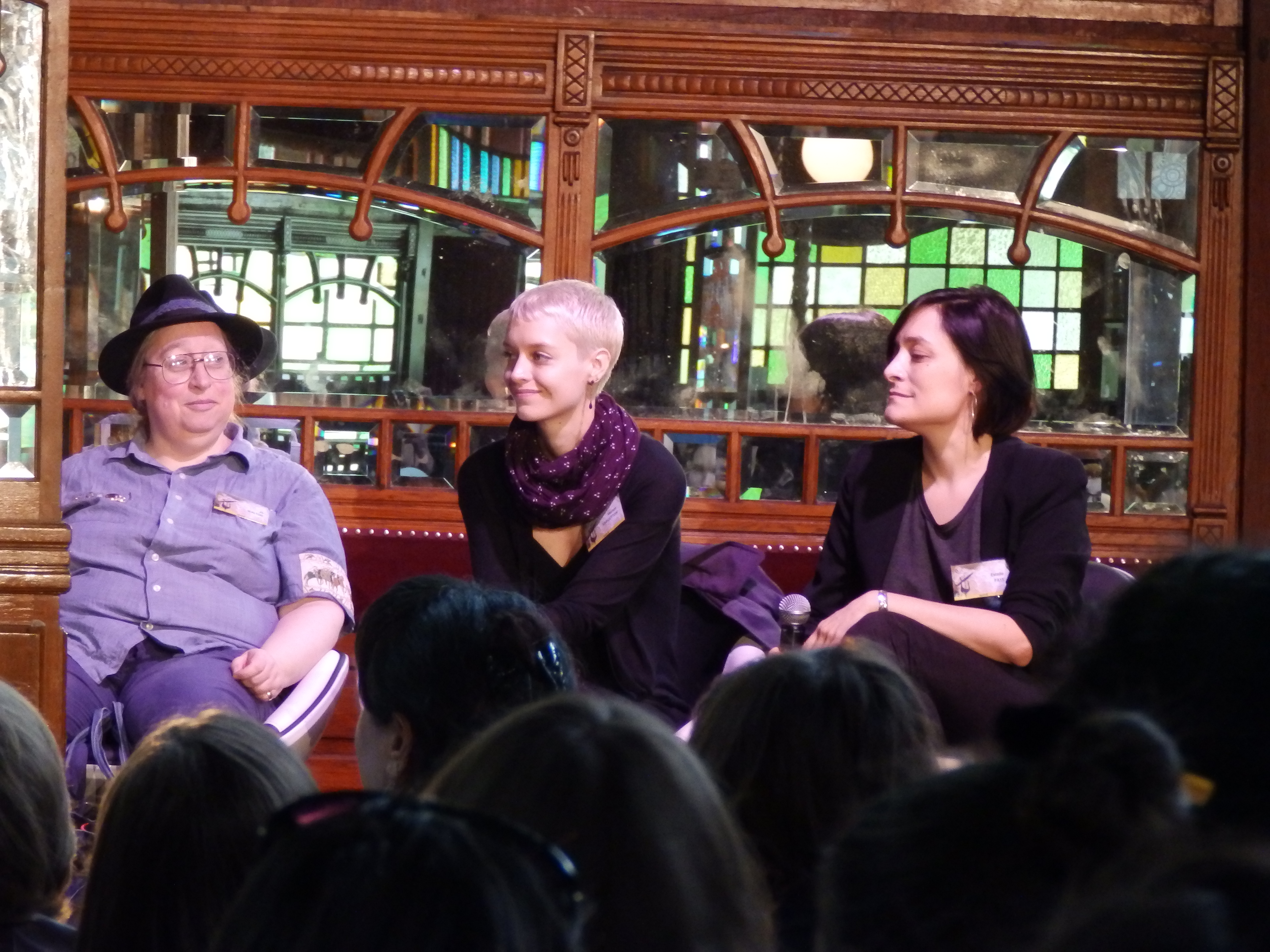
With Jo Walton at the Imaginales in 2017.

After taking drama classes in Paris and San Francisco, Estelle Faye turned her attention to directing and writing science fiction, horror and fantasy. In 2008, she graduated from the screenwriting section of Femis. She has written several short films, one of which won the Prix France Télévisions.

She started to write fantasy fiction in 2008 after responding to a call by Calmann-Lévy to propose stories for an anthology around the theme of dragons. She published her first adult novel Porcelaine. In 2017 she published a dark fantasy novel Les seigneurs de Boyen, in which monsters, magic, sorcery are invoked in a tale questioning the making of real away from circles of power. The novel also features various magical creatures, among which a changeling, a hermaphrodite, a monk of uncertain sexual status, a lesbian, a vulture, all creatures whose differences sexual or magical coerce and are attracted to each other, revelling a part of the revolution to be.

In 2018 she published a feminist and anarchist novel, Les nuages de Magellan.

Her novel L'arpenteuse des rêves published in 2021 is an ecological tale inspired by the IPCC Sixth Assessment Report and evolves around themes of climatic change.

Her books are illustrated by Amandine Labarre.

Since 2019, she has been taking part in the writing podcast Procrastination with Lionel Davoust and Mélanie Fazi.

She is a member of the Charte des auteurs et illustrateurs jeunesse. She intervened in feminist and gender themed conferences on science fiction.

Along with everal authors she published a letter of support for Stéphanie Nicot after her eviction as director of Les Imaginales by the Épinal town hall, among which ïan Larue, Silène Edgar, Sylvie Lainé, Robin Hobb, Sara Doke, Sylvie Denis, Lucie Chenu, Sarah Buschmann, Charlotte Bousquet and Anne Besson.

== Awards ==
- Elbakin.net Award, 2013, for Porcelaine.
- Elbakin.net Award, 2015, for Thya.
- Prix Imaginales, 2015, pour La voie des oracles.
- Prix Actusf de l'Uchronie, 2016, for La Voie des oracles, tome 3.
- Prix Imaginales, 2016, for Une robe couleur d’océan.
- Prix Bob-Morane, 2019, of Les Nuages de Magellan.
- Prix Rosny aîné du, 2019, for Les Nuages de Magellan
- Prix Imaginales, 2019, pour Les Guerriers de glace.
- Prix Rosny aîné, 2021, for Conte de la pluie qui n’est pas venue.
- Prix Renaudot for Les Magies de l’archipel – tome 1- Arcadia
- Prix Ados Créateurs, 2023 for L’Arpenteuse de rêves

== Works ==
=== Drama ===
- Le Côté bleu du ciel, L'Harmattan, coll. « Théâtre des cinq continents »

=== Novels ===
==== La Voie des oracles serie ====
- Thya, Scrineo, 2014
- Enoch, Scrineo, 2015
- Aylus, Scrineo, 2016

==== Bohen serie ====
- Les Seigneurs de Bohen, 2017
- Les révoltés de Bohen, 2019

==== Les Magies de l'archipel serie ====
- Arcadia, Nathan, 2022
- La cité mirage, Nathan, 2023
- L'ile pirate, Nathan, 2023
- Faye, Estelle; Sanoe (2024). Atlantis. Les magies de l'archipel (in French). Paris: Nathan. ISBN 978-2-09-503077-3.

=== Stand alone novels ===
- L'été de la reine bleue
- Porcelaine
- Widjigo
- Un éclat de givre, 2014
- Un reflet de Lune, 2022
- Les Seigneurs de Bohen, 2017
- Les guerriers de glace
- Les nuages de Magellan, 2018
- Le drakkar éternel, 2020
- La dernière Amazone, 2021
- Brouillard sur la baie, 2021
- L’Arpenteuse de rêves, 2021
- Il était ma légende, 2022
- Les Magies de l’archipel, 2023
- Le défi de Yaran, 2024
- La sirène et la licorne, 2024

=== Anthologies ===
- En-dessous, Parchemins et traverses, coll. « Les Anthologies des réalités imaginaires », 2014.
- Dimension routes de légendes, légendes de la route, with Jérôme Akkouche, Rivière blanche, 2016.
- Faye, Estelle; Caussarieu, Morgane; Cordier, Barbara; Fauré, Anouk; Felton, Lizzie; Guillot, Cécile; Le Bars, Louise; Papoz, Micky; Soulas, Floriane (5 May 2023). Nous parlons depuis les ténèbres (in French). GOATER Editions. ISBN 978-2383670100.

=== Filmography ===
==== Actress ====
- 2004 : La Nourrice : the revolted women
- 2005 : Clara Sheller : the seller of the travel agency

==== Screenwriter ====
- 2007 : Carcasse d'Ismaël El Maoula El Iraki
- 2017 : Tout ce qui grouille sous la mer with Fabien Legeron

== Bibliography ==
- Kyrou, Ariel; Vincent, Jérôme (2024-07-11). Pourquoi lire de la science-fiction et de la fantasy (in French). Nouvelles Éditions Actu SF. ISBN 978-2-37686-653-4.
- Bougon, Marie-Lucie (2019-10-15). "Cosmogonie de la fantasy française: Genèse et émancipation". Revue de la BNF. 59 (2): 38–47. doi:10.3917/rbnf.059.0038. ISSN 1254-7700.
- Berthier, Manon (2021-01-18). "Dynamiques de la marginalité : l'héroïsme féminin dans l'espace narratif lesbien". Lectures politiques de la fantasy (in French). doi:10.58079/ook9.
- Maurin, Florie (2022). "Rêveuses et personnages oniriques dans Le Monde de Lléna et L'Arpenteuse de rêves". HAL Open Science.
