= Òscar Vendrell Corrons =

Spanish writer (born 1973)

Òscar Vendrell
- Born: 29 October 1973 (age 52); Barcelona, Catalonia, Spain
- Occupation: Writer
- Writing career
- Pen name: Peter Walker
- Language: Catalan
- Genres: Teaching fiction

Òscar Vendrell Corrons (Barcelona, 29 October 1973) is a proof-reader and author of textbooks and fiction works. He has signed some works under the pseudonym of Peter Walker.

== Published work ==
=== Narrative ===
- El Club de la petanca, (Barcelona : Publicacions de l'Abadia de Montserrat), 2010 ISBN 978-84-9883-265-5
- Em dic Nicòstrat, (Barcelona : Publicacions de l'Abadia de Montserrat), 2010 ISBN 978-84-9883-259-4
- La Llar dels Cabells, (Barcelona : Publicacions de l'Abadia de Montserrat), 2010 ISBN 978-84-9883-264-8
- El Tresor de la memòria, (Barcelona : Baula), 2011 ISBN 978-84-4792-328-1
- La Zombi espina , (Barcelona : Saldonar), 2012. ISBN 978-84-9378-007-4

Under the pseudonym of Peter Walker:

- Atrapat al Zombi Park, (Barcelona : Baula), 2012. ISBN 978-84-4792-537-7
- El Secret de Morisville, (Barcelona : Baula), 2012. ISBN 978-84-4792-536-0
- La nit dels zombies mutants, (Barcelona : Baula), 2012. ISBN 978-84-4792-538-4
- El Cau del faraó, (Barcelona : Baula), 2013. ISBN 978-84-4792-669-5
- La illa dels canibals, (Barcelona : Baula), 2013. ISBN 978-84-4792-592-6
- La fortalesa del capità Nemo, (Barcelona : Baula), 2013. ISBN 978-84-4792-593-3

== Translations ==
- Jane Ray, El primer nadal. Barcelona : Montena, 2000.
- Jane Ray, Així va començar el món. Barcelona : Montena, 2000.
- Silvia Ludmer-Cohen, La Reina de la nit . Barcelona : Montena Mondadori, 2000.
- Melvin Burgess, Enamorarse en abril. Barcelona : Montena Mondadori, 2001.
- Charles Perrault, La Rateta grisa. Barcelona : Montena, 2001.
- Myriam Deru, La Rateta grisa. Barcelona : Montena, 2002.
- Richard Powell, Què rossega el ratolí?. Barcelona : Beascoa, 2002.
- Richard Powell, On juga al porquet?. Barcelona : Beascoa, 2002.
- Richard Powell, Què li agrada a l'abella?. Barcelona : Beascoa, 2002.
- Richard Powell, Què menja el conill?. Barcelona : Beascoa, 2002.
- Thierry Lenain, Els Petons de la Marta. Barcelona : Baula, 2010.
- Pierre Bottero, El Llindar obscur de la màgia. Barcelona : Baula, 2012.
- Erik L'Homme, La Pàl·lida llum de les tenebres. Barcelona : Baula, 2013.
