= Vilotijević =

Origin
- Language: Serbian
- Region of origin: Serbia and Montenegro

Other names
- Variant form: Vilotije

Vilotijević (Serbian Cyrillic: Вилотијевић) is a Montenegrin surname derived from the male given name Vilotije. It is found in Serbia and Montenegro. It that may refer to:

- Mila Vilotijević, Serbian soprano
- Maja-Iskra Vilotijevic
- Marija Vilotijević, Serbian author
- Mladen Vilotijević (born 1935), Serbian academic and author.
- Dragan Vilotijević
- Jelena Vilotijević
- Nada Vilotijević (born 1953), Serbian professor and author.
- Slavica Vilotijević
- Slaviša Vilotijević
- Radojica Vilotijević
- Žarko Vilotijević, Montenegrin footballer

== Vilotijević family in Drobnjaci ==
In the Drobnjaci region, there is a Vilotijević family which lives in Duže. They were earlier surnamed Grgurović, and even earlier as Dančulović, derived from Dančul, the son of voivode Ðurjan. Today's Vilotijevići descend from Vilotije Grgurović, who lived during the 18th century. Vilotije had a brother, Pavić, from whom the Pavićevići sprung. Today's Vilotijevići sprung from Vilotije's sons Redžo, Sava, Kiko, Radojica and Pejo. Radojica was a notable hero. In the beginning of the 20th century Mrdak Vilotijević was known as a good host and hero, and he died in the Battle of Mojkovac (1916). Mrdak's son, Dr. Radoš, a Yugoslav Partisan since 1941, worked as an officer in the medical corps, officer and manager of the division hospitals. These Vilotijevići are spread throughout Serbia and Montenegro (1997). They have the krsna slava (patron saint) of St. Sava (Савиндан).

== See also ==
- Secondary school "Braća Vilotijević", in Kraljevo, Serbia
- Vilotić
