= Erik L'Homme =

French novelist

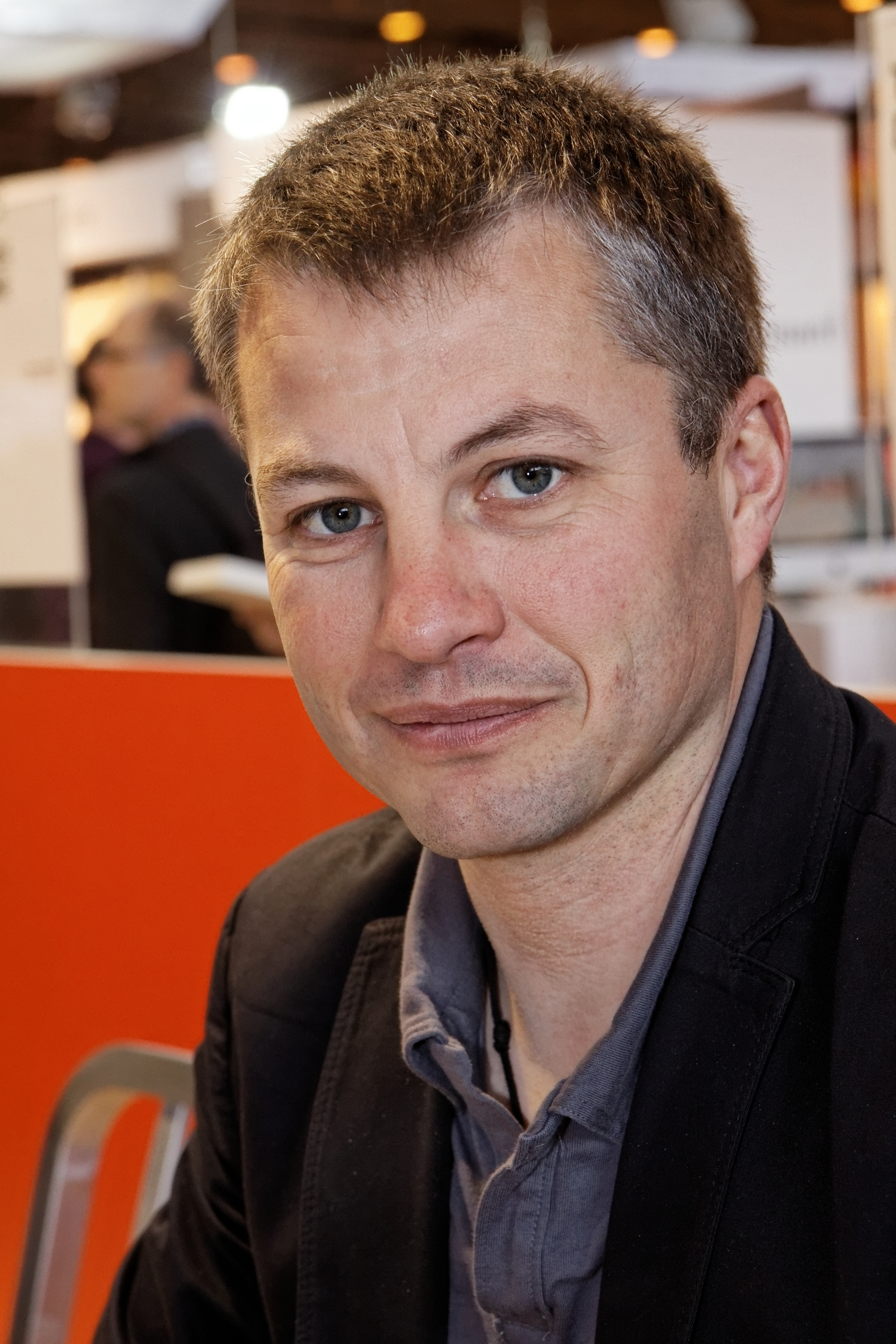
L'Homme at Salon du livre de Paris in 2012

Erik L'Homme, (born 22 December 1967 in Grenoble), is a French writer of youth novels. He is known for the fantasy trilogy Book of the Stars, the space opera trilogy Les Maîtres des brisants and the fantasy thriller series Phænomen. As of 2014, his works had sold a total of 1.1 million copies in France. The French-language edition of Book of the Stars has sold 650,000 copies and been translated into 28 languages, which have sold another million copies.

== Works ==
- Parlons khowar : langue et culture de l'ancien royaume de Chitral au Pakistan, Éditions L'Harmattan, 1999
- Book of the Stars (Le Livre des étoiles)
  - Volume 1: Quadehar the Sorcerer (Qadehar le sorcier), Gallimard Jeunesse, Paris, 2001
  - Volume 2: The Mystery of Lord Sha (Le Seigneur Sha), Gallimard Jeunesse, Paris, 2002
  - Volume 3: The Face of the Shadow (Le Visage de l'Ombre), Gallimard Jeunesse, Paris, 2003
- Les Maîtres des brisants
  - Volume 1: Chien-de-la-lune, Gallimard Jeunesse, Paris, 2004
  - Volume 2: Le Secret des abîmes, 2005, Gallimard Jeunesse, Paris
  - Volume 3: Seigneurs de guerre, Gallimard Jeunesse, Paris, 2009
- Tales of a Lost Kingdom (Contes d'un royaume perdu), 2005, Gallimard Jeunesse
- Phænomen
  - Volume 1, 2006, Gallimard Jeunesse
  - Volume 2, 2006, Gallimard Jeunesse
  - Volume 3, 2006, Gallimard Jeunesse
- Cochon rouge, Gallimard Jeunesse, collection Folio Junior, 2009
- Des pas dans la neige, aventures au Pakistan, 2010, Gallimard Jeunesse
- A comme Association
  - Les limites obscures de la magie, 2010, Gallimard Jeunesse and Rageot Éditeur
  - La pâle lumière des ténèbres (with Pierre Bottero), 2010, Gallimard Jeunesse and Rageot Éditeur
  - L'étoffe fragile du monde, 2011, Gallimard Jeunesse and Rageot Éditeur
  - Le subtil parfum du soufre (with Pierre Bottero), 2011, Gallimard Jeunesse and Rageot Éditeur
  - Là où les mots n'existent pas, 2011, Gallimard Jeunesse and Rageot Éditeur
  - Ce qui dort dans la nuit, 2011, Gallimard Jeunesse and Rageot Éditeur
  - Car nos cœurs sont hantés, 2012, Gallimard Jeunesse and Rageot Éditeur
  - Le regard brûlant des étoiles, 2012, Gallimard Jeunesse and Rageot Éditeur
- Le regard des princes à minuit, 2014 Gallimard Jeunesse
- Terre-Dragon
  - Volume 1: Le souffle des pierres, Série Romans Junior, Gallimard Jeunesse, 2014
