= Mila Vilotijević =

Serbian soprano (born 1956)

- Born: 1956 (age 69–70); Belgrade, Yugoslavia
- Education: Academy of Music of the University of Belgrade, "Luigi Cherubini" Florence Conservatory
- Occupation: soprano

Mila Vilotijević (Serbian Cyrillic: Мила Вилотијевић; born 1956) is a Serbian soprano. She was born in Belgrade and graduated from the Academy of Music of the University of Belgrade with Irina Ariskin. In 1989 she was awarded her diploma from the "Luigi Cherubini" Florence Conservatory, Florence Italy with Renata Ongaro and Liliana Poli. During her career she was mentored by Elly Ameling, Julia Hamari, Galina Vishnevskaya, Sena Jurinac, Lora Fisher, Irwin Gagge, and Giorgio Favaretto. She performs a vast repertory of music: opera, oratorio and lieder from the Baroque to the present As active solo singer, she participated in the most important music festivals in Europe including Florence (La Damnation de Faust under Myung-Whun Chung and Der Freischütz under Wolfgang Sawallisch) and Salzburg (Tchaikovsky's Yolanta with Galina Vishnevskaya at the Mozarteum). From 1998 she is a "soprano I del Teatro alla Scala di Milano".

== See also ==
- Vilotijević
