= Vilotić =

Vilotić (Serbian: Вилотић) is a surname. Notable people with the surname include:

- Milan Vilotić (born 1986), Serbian footballer
- Stevan Vilotić (1925–1989), Yugoslav football manager

== See also ==
- Vilotijević
