= Nada Vilotijević =

Nada Vilotijević (Serbian Cyrillic: Нада Вилотијевић; born July 8, 1953) is a Serbian University professor at Teacher Training Faculty in Belgrade (University of Belgrade) and author. She works and resides in Belgrade, Serbia, and has published over 10 books. She is married to Mladen Vilotijević with whom she has one son, Viktor Vilotijević.

== See also ==
- Vilotijević
