= Ïan Larue =

French SF writer

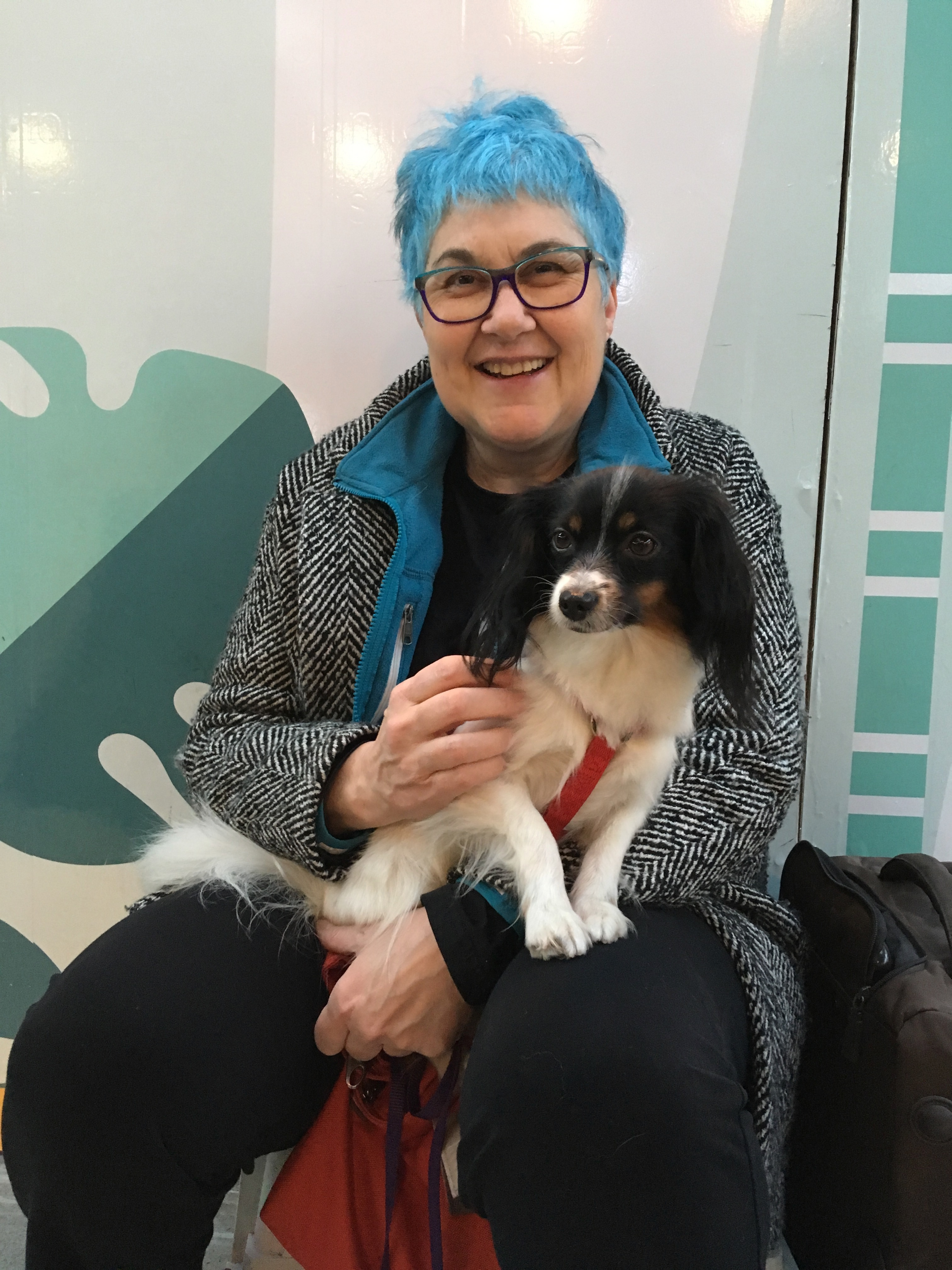
- Born: 2 September 1958; Angers
- Other name: Anne Larue
- Occupation: writer
- Known for: Libère-toi cyborg, le pouvoir transformateur de la science-fiction féministe

Ïan Larue (2 September 1958) is a French essayist, science fiction author and painter. She has published two science fiction novels, La Vestale du calix and La fille geek.

One of her best-selling books, Libère-toi cyborg. Le pouvoir transformateur de la science-fiction féministe, deals with the theme of cyborgs. Reflecting on the list of feminist science fiction authors cited at the end of Donna Haraway's Cyborg Manifesto (including Octavia Butler), Ïan Larue redefines this founding figure in the philosopher's thought. According to the author, ‘The cyborg is the ultimate hybrid, a hybrid between a real woman and a character in a novel who is superimposed on her to endow her with a thousand new possibilities, including the fundamental one of breaking up capitalism, family and patriarchy.’ In 2019 Ïan Larue was the winner of the Grand prix de l'Imaginaire, in the ‘Essays’ category, for this non-fiction book.

== Biography ==
After teaching at the University of Reims Champagne-Ardenne, Ïan Larue worked at the Sorbonne Paris North University teaching comparative literature.

=== Libère-toi cyborg ===
Her essay Libère-toi cyborg, le pouvoir transformateur de la science-fiction féministe (Set yourself free, Cyborg ! The transformative power of feminist science fiction), published in 2018, placed her among the leading French-language figures in feminist science fiction. In the essay, she comments extensively Donna Harraway's Cyborg Manifesto, and reproduces in an appendix Harraway's ‘H-list’ of works by women science fiction novelists that she believed were must-reads for building a utopian future world free of racism and sexism, or even one that embraces a hybridisation between nature and technology. Among these must read women SF writer ared : included : Octavia Butler (Dawn, part of the Xenogenesis Trilogy), Joanna Russ (The Female Man), Monique Wittig (Les Guérillères) and James Tiptree, Jr (Beyond the World's Walls). In these worlds, cyborgs transgress gender and norms, while often incorporating aspects of ecofeminism and feminist figures of witchcraft, creating a path of emancipation and joyful liberation.

=== Painting ===
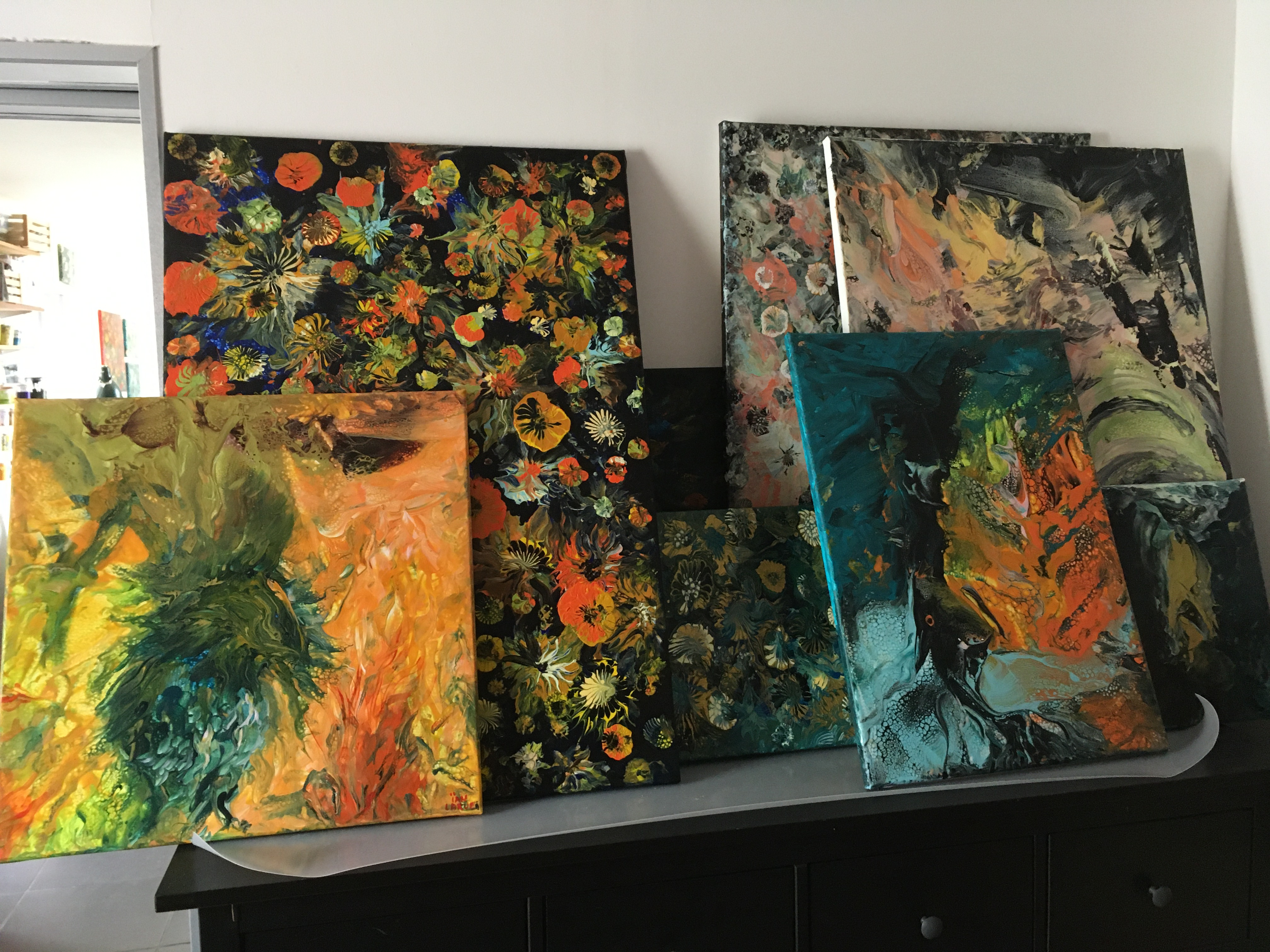
Paintings by Ïan Larue.

Ïan Larue is the granddaughter of the painter and film set designer Charles Mérangel. She has been painting since the age of eleven. She held exhibitions in the 2000s[1]. In 2020 she took part in the group exhibition Even the rocks reach out to kiss you, at the Centre d'art contemporain Transpalette in Bourges and the exhibition Rêver l'obscur, at the Galerie d'art brut Christian Berst in Paris[3]. The curator of both exhibitions is Julie Crenn, an exhibition curator, art historian and specialist in ecofeminist art.

She has also published an essay about the role of women painters throughout history from antiquity and medieval times, questioning the reasons of their disappearance from historical reviews.

== Activism ==
In 2022 Ïan Larue protested against the eviction of Stéphanie Nicot from the festival Les imaginales by publishing a letter of support for Nicot with other authors among whom Floriane Soulas, Silène Edgar, Sylvie Lainé, Robin Hobb, Estelle Faye, Sara Doke, Sylvie Denis, Lucie Chenu, Sarah Buschmann, Charlotte Bousquet and Anne Besson.

== Publications ==
- Délire et tragédie: Sénèque/Hercule furieux, Shakespeare/Le roi Lear, Strindberg/Père (in French). Mont-de-Marsan : Saint-Pierre-du-Mont, France: Editions InterUniversitaires; Diffusion, SPEC. 1995. ISBN 978-2-87817-071-9.
- Delacroix, Eugène (1996). Larue, Anne (ed.). Dictionnaire des beaux-arts. Collection Savoir Sur l'art (in French). Paris: Hermann, éditeurs des sciences et des arts. ISBN 978-2-7056-6298-1.
- Romantisme et mélancolie: le Journal de Delacroix. Bibliothèque de littérature générale et comparée (in French). Paris : Genève: H. Champion; Diffusion hors France, Editions Slatkine. 1998. ISBN 978-2-85203-886-8.
- A la guerre comme au théâtre: Les Perses, Henry IV, Les paravents. Lectures croisées (in French). Paris: Editions du Temps. 2000. ISBN 978-2-84274-126-6.
- L'autre mélancolie: Acedia, ou les chambres de l'esprit. Collection Savoir. Lettres (in French). Paris: Hermann. 2001. ISBN 978-2-7056-6428-2.
- Le Masochisme, ou comment ne pas devenir un suicidé de la société (in French). Éditions Talus d’approche. 2022. ISBN 978-2872460915.
- Le Surréalisme de Duchamp à Deleuze (in French). Éditions Talus d’approche. 2003. ISBN 978-2872460960.
- Une vie de Démocrite, Belgique (in French). Éditions Talus d’approche. 2004. ISBN 2-87246-103-5.
- Poètes de l'amour: Ovide, Pétrarque, Shakespeare, Goethe. Lectures croisées (in French). Nantes: Éd. du Temps. 2004. ISBN 978-2-84274-284-3.
- La femme est-elle soluble dans l'eau de vaisselle ?. Chiflet & Cie (in French). Paris: Chiflet & Cie. 2008. ISBN 978-2-35164-050-0.
- Fiction, féminisme et postmodernité: les voies subversives du roman contemporain à grand succès. Perspectives comparatistes (in French). Paris: Éditions Classiques Garnier. 2010. ISBN 978-2-8124-0122-0. OCLC 633256531.
- Dis Papa, c'était quoi le patriarcat ?. Éditions iXe. 2013. ISBN 978-1-09006-216-1.
- Larue, Anne; Nachtergael, Magali (2014). Histoire de l'art d'un nouveau genre. Beaux livres (in French). Paris: Max Milo. ISBN 978-2-315-00607-6.
- Papillons et phalènes au début du XXe siècle: Marie-Louise Bouctot-Vagniez et la SFACA (in French). Bruyères-le-Châtel: Éditions du CAPP. 2017. ISBN 978-2-9560119-0-3.
- Libère-toi cyborg! le pouvoir transformateur de la science-fiction féministe. Sorcières (in French). Paris: Cambourakis. 2018. ISBN 978-2-36624-372-7.
- Les dinosaures rêvent-elles de Hollywood?, ou, Comment l'industrie du cinéma vulgarise la culture du viol: un essai-fiction sur l'empouvoirement femelle. Collection Racine de iXe (in French). Donnemarie-Dontilly: Éditions iXe. 2021. ISBN 979-10-90062-71-9.
