= Jean-Philippe Jaworski =

French author

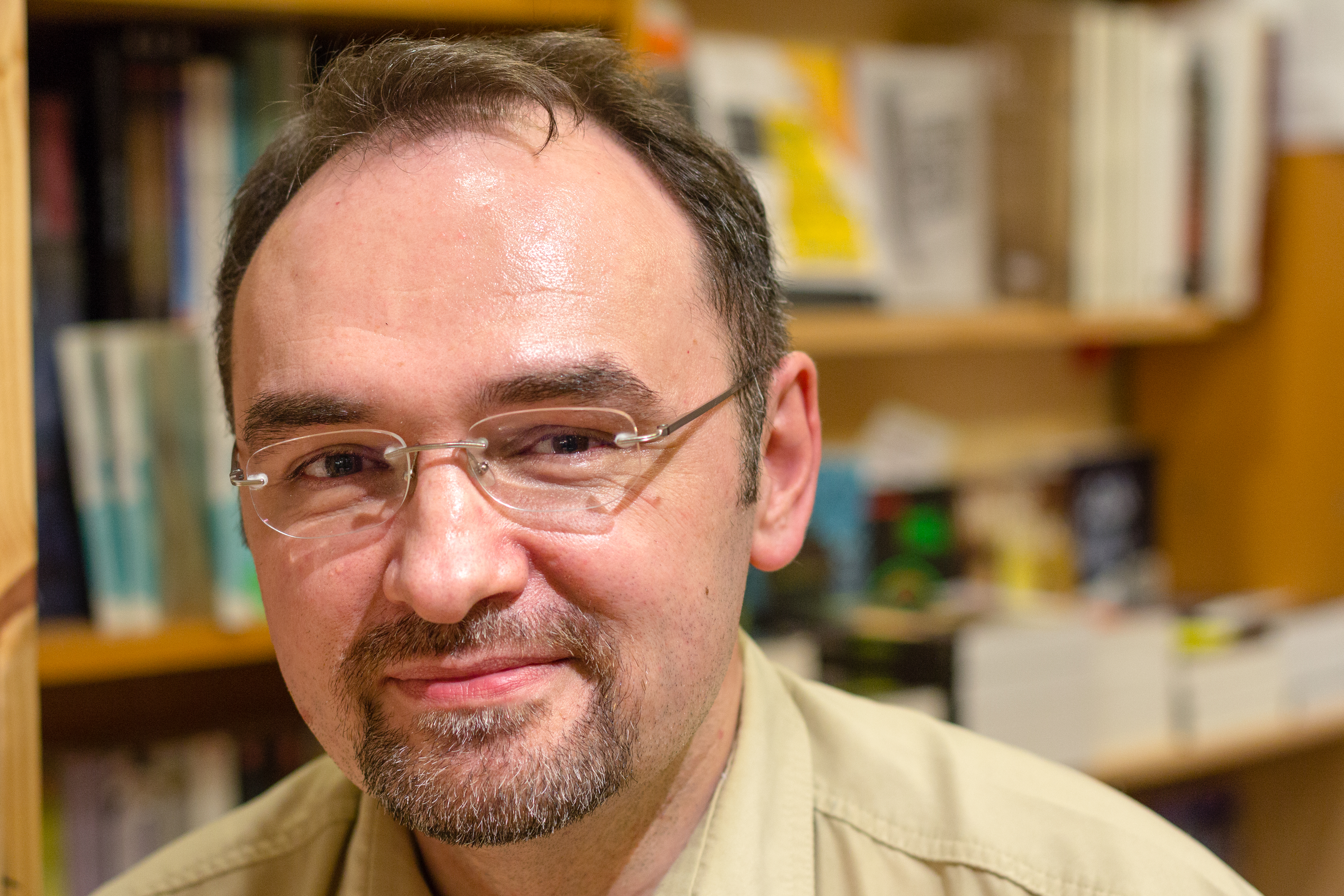

Jean-Philippe Jaworski (born 1969) is a French author of fantasy literature and role-playing games.

== Career ==
Born in 1969, Jaworski is a teacher of French literature at a lycée in Nancy.

In 1983, having become interested in role-playing games, he wrote two amateur pen and paper role-playing games: Tiers âge, based on the Third Age of J. R. R. Tolkien's Middle-earth, and Te deum pour un massacre, a period adventure taking place in 16th century France during the Wars of Religion. Te deum pour un massacre was eventually published in 2005.

Jaworski published his first work of fiction, Janua Vera, in 2007, and was awarded that year's Prix du Cafard cosmique for it. This collection of novellas is set in a fantasy world, Le Vieux Royaume, characterized by a low degree of supernatural activity and inspired by swashbuckler novels and historical fiction. Jaworski continued to develop this world in his first novel, Gagner la guerre. Published in 2009, it was awarded that year's Prix Imaginales for the best French-language novel.

== Works ==
=== Fiction ===
- « Celles qui marchent dans l'ombre », in Mythophages, éditions de L'Oxymore, 2004 (novella)
- « Janua Vera » (Prix du Cafard cosmique), Les moutons électriques, 2007 (novella collection)
- « Gagner la guerre » (Prix Imaginales 2009; Prix du premier roman Région Rhône-Alpes), Les moutons électriques, 2009 (novel); forthcoming in English as To the Victor go the Spoils
- « Montefellóne », in Stéphanie Nicot (dir.) Rois et capitaines, Mnémos, 2009 (novella)
- « Préquelle », in Jérôme Vincent, Charlotte Volper & Eric Holstein (dir.), Utopiales 09, Actusf, 2009 (novella)
- « Janua vera », Les moutons électriques, 2010 (novella collection, expanded edition)
- « La troisième hypostase », in Stéphanie Nicot (dir.) Magiciennes et sorciers, Mnémos, 2010 (novella)
- « Même pas mort » (Rois du Monde, I), Les moutons électriques, 2013 (novel)
- « Chasse Royale I » (Rois du Monde, II), Les moutons électriques, 2015 (novel)
- « Chasse Royale II » (Rois du Monde, III), Les moutons électriques, 2017 (novel)
- « Chasse Royale III » (Rois du Monde, IV), Les moutons électriques, 2019 (novel)
- « Chasse Royale IV » (Rois du Monde, V), Les moutons électriques, 2020 (novel)
- « Le Tournoi des preux » (Le Chevalier aux Epines, I), Les moutons électriques, 2023 (novel)
- « Le Conte de l'assassin » (Le Chevalier aux Epines, II), Les moutons électriques, 2023 (novel)
- « Le Débat des dames » (Le Chevalier aux Epines, III), Les moutons électriques, 2024 (novel)

=== Role-playing games ===
- « Tiers Âge », 2000 (unpublished)
- « Faim de loup », Casus Belli n°19, 2003 (adventure)
- « Te Deum pour un massacre », Éditions du Matagot, 2005
- « Trois meschantes affaires », Éditions du Matagot, 2005 (adventures)
- « 1562 : Paris assiégé », Casus Belli n° 37, 2006 (adventure)

=== Articles ===
- « Théorie des Humeurs ludiques », Casus Belli n°14, 2002
- « Le Seigneur des Anneaux : la tentation du mal » Casus Belli n°18, 2003
- « Te Deum pour un massacre : jouer dans une Histoire douloureuse », in Olivier Caïra et Jérôme Larré (dir.), Jouer avec l'Histoire, Pinkerton Press, 2009
- « Évasion diégétique », in Jeu est un autre - Le ludique et la science-fiction (Yellow Submarine n°134), 2009

== Personal life ==
Ahead of the 2024 French legislative election, he co-signed a statement with other figures from French speculative fiction in support of a New Popular Front against the far-right.
