= Pierre Bottero =

French writer

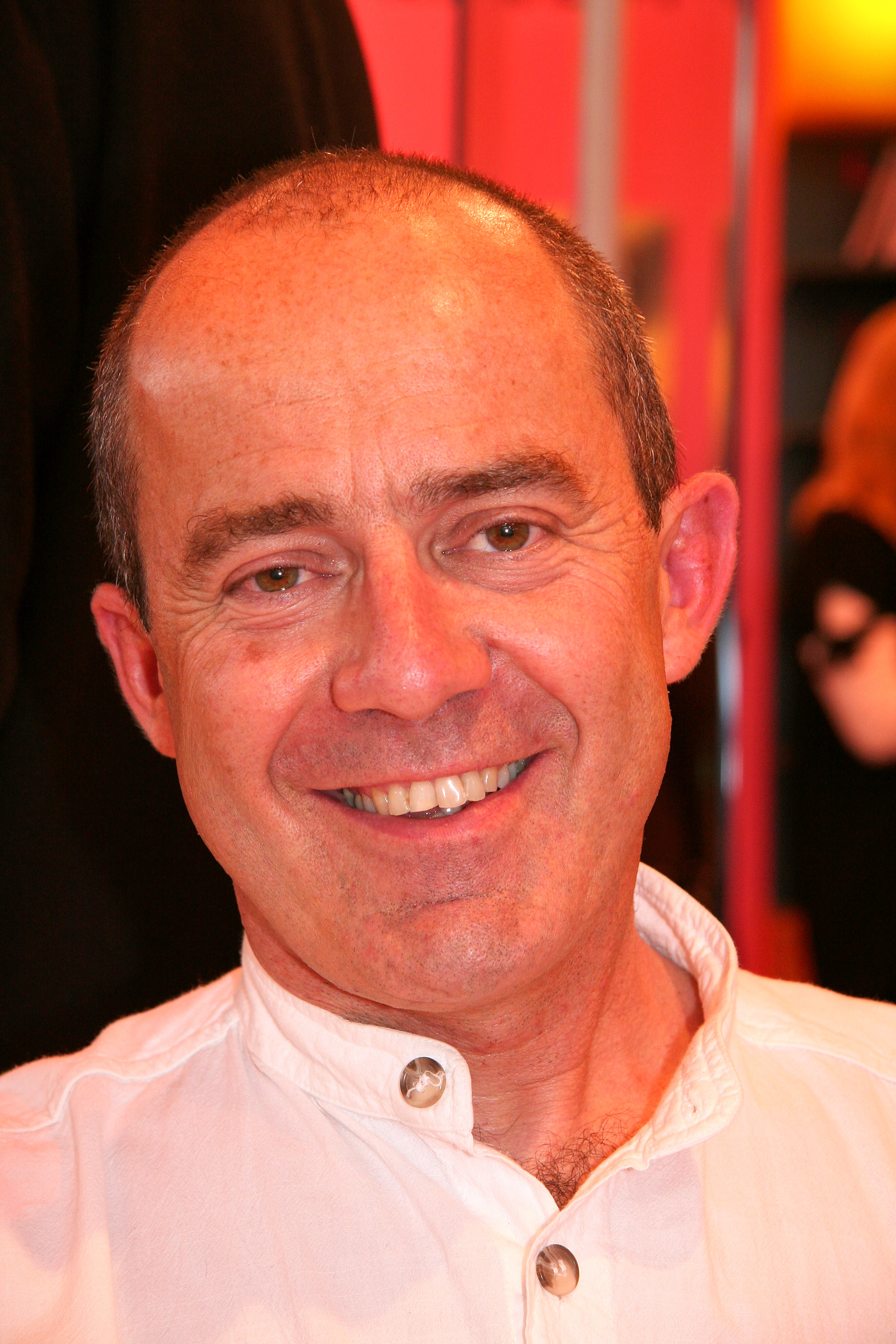
- Pierre Bottero, March 2008
- Born: 13 February 1964
- Died: 8 November 2009 (aged 45)
- Citizenship: France

Pierre Bottero (13 February 1964 – 8 November 2009) was a French writer.

== Biography ==
He was born on 13 February 1964 in Barcelonnette, in the Alps. As a very young man, he came to live in Provence, a region he never left since then. He said that he wouldn’t be able to live without sun, mistral and cicadas. Married and father of a family, he worked as a primary school teacher for a long time before turning completely towards writing. Passionate about French literature and convinced of the power of imagination and words, he always dreamed of alternate universes, dragons, magic. He died on 8 November 2009.

== Career ==
He published his first texts at Flammarion, including his debut novel Amies à vie, before releasing la quête d'Ewilan then les mondes d'Ewilan (double trilogy that follows each other), Le pacte des Marchombres, and L’autre (trilogies), three heroic fantasy series, a genre he especially loved. His love for fantastic literature started early in life, with the works of J.R.R. Tolkien, followed by deep and frequent divings into the universes of Farmer, Zelazny, Howard, Bradley, Moorcock and Leiber, as well as those of other master magicians. He was greatly impacted by these readings, both on his imagination and his personality; he stated that he never felt like having invented anything: "I just open the door and the story goes from my mind to my computer."

Some other projects have seen the light, mostly at Rageot, or were in the making as Bottero spent most of his time writing, while he wasn’t touring all over France for animations or book fairs. In 2008, he won the teenager prize in Rennes, Ille-et-Vilaine for the first volume of L'autre: le souffle de la hyène, released at Rageot. This is a prize given each year by the high school students from the Ille-et-Vilaine department, who choose to vote amongst 10 books. He also received the departmental prize of Hérault by the students in 6th and 7th grade for Le Pacte des Marchombres (a trilogy dedicated to Ellana, one of the main characters in the series La Quête d'Ewilan and Les Mondes d'Ewilan); and the prize “Imaginales” in 2011 in Epinal for Les Âmes Croisées.

On 4 December 2008 he was awarded the prize of the Paille en Queue (a bird that can be found in La Réunion) on the occasion of the third youth book fair of Indian Ocean in Le Port (La Réunion). He explained, "[As a child] I dreamt of staggering adventures swarming of dangers but I could find the gate to the parallel world! I ended persuading myself this world doesn’t exist and I dealt with a classic world… until I started to write novels! A flavor of adventure slid down my life. Strange colours, surprising creatures, odd towns… I had found the door/gate."

== Works ==
=== Works linked (closely or remotely) to Gwendalavir Universe ===
Ewilan’s quest: (2003), trilogy composed of “From One World to Another, The Icy Frontiers, Destiny Island”

Les Mondes d'Ewilan (Ewilan’s World) (2004), trilogy following Ewilan’s Quest : La Forêt des captifs (Captive’s Forest), L'Œil d'Otolep (Otolep’s Eye) and Les Tentacules du mal (Tentacles of the Evil)

Le Pacte des Marchombres (The Marchombre’s Pact) (2008), trilogy composed of Ellana, Ellana l'Envol, (Ellana the Flight) et Ellana la Prophétie (Ellana : the Prophecy)

L'Autre (The Other) (2006), the trilogy Le Souffle de la Hyène (the Breathing of the Hyena), Le Maître des tempêtes (The Master of the Storms) and La Huitième Porte (The Eighth Door)

Les Âmes croisées (Crossed Souls) (2010 – Posthumous work)

Le Chant du Troll (The Song of the Troll) (2010 – graphic novel created with Gilles Francescano – posthumous work)

=== Other works ===
Amies à vie (2001) (Lifetime Friends)

Le Garçon qui voulait courir vite (2002) (The boy who wanted to run fast

Mon cheval, mon destin (2002) (My horse, my fate)

Un cheval en Irlande (2003) (A Horse in Ireland)

Zouck (2004)

Tour B2, mon amour (2006) (B2 tower, my love)

Isayama (2007 - Album)

A comme Association (2010) (A for Association) – (Serie by Erik L’Homme which volumes II and IV are realized by with Pierre Bottero )

Fils de sorcières (Witches’ Sons)

Le Voleur de chouchous (The scrunchie stealer)

Météorite

Les Aigles de Vishan Lour (Eagles of Vishan Lour)

Princesse en danger (Princess in Danger)
