= Mladen Vilotijević =

Serbian academic and author (born 1935)

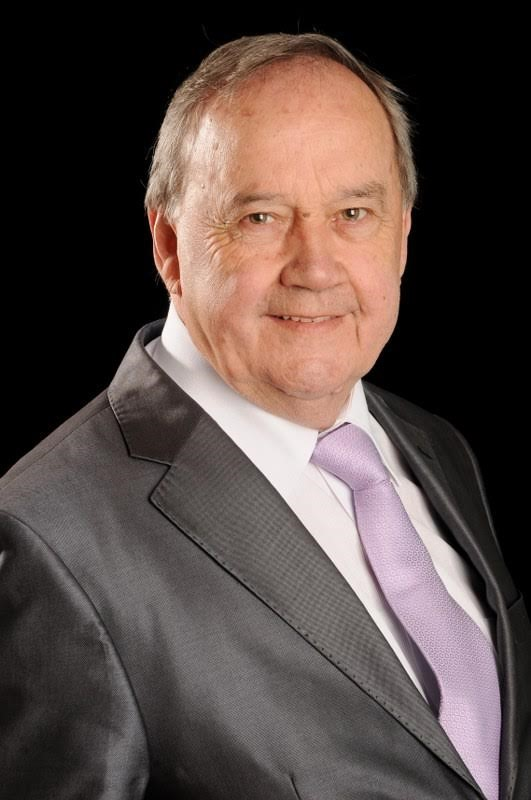
Mladen Vilotijević

Mladen Vilotijević (Serbian Cyrillic: Младен Вилотијевић; born March 22, 1935) is a Serbian academic and author. He is a member of the Serbian Academy of Education (Српска академија образовања).
