= Silène Edgar =

French teacher, writer, and researcher

- Sophie Ruhaud
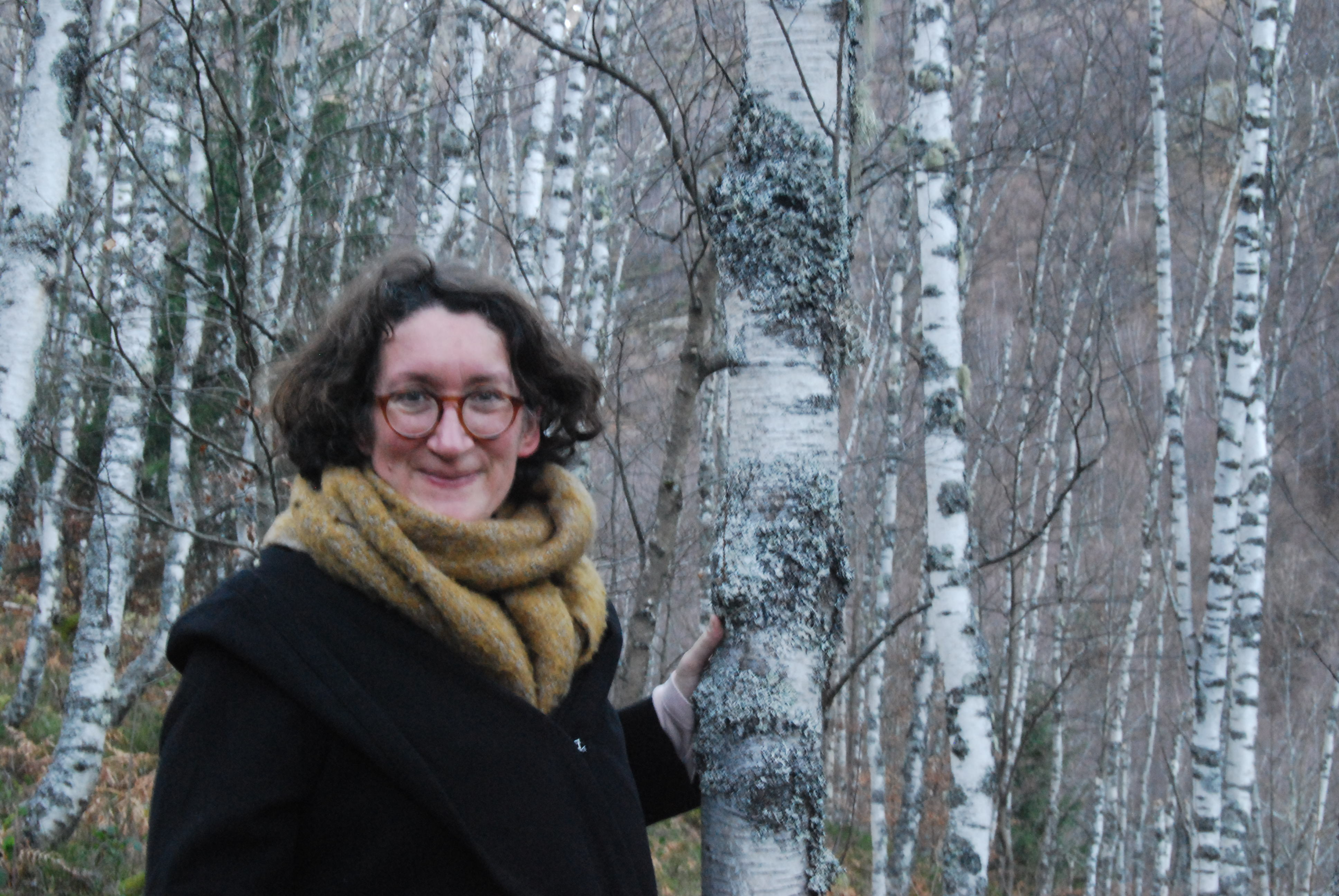
- Born: Sophie Ruhaud; September 25, 1978 (age 48); Rennes, Bretagne, France
- Occupations: teacher, writer, researcher
- Writing career
- Pen name: Silène Edgar, George Silène

Silène Edgar or George Silène, (born Sophie Ruhaud, September 25, 1978), is a French teacher, writer, and researcher.

== Early life and education ==
Sophie Claire Marie Ruhaud-Trouffier was born on September 25, 1978 in Rennes, Ille-et-Vilaine. Her parents are Bernard Ruhaud, a writer and Josiane Danièle Salgues. The poet Étienne Ruhaud is her brother.

She obtained her Baccalauréat Littéraire at the Jean-Dautet high school in La Rochelle, then continued her studies in literature in Poitiers. She obtained a master's degree in comparative literature at the Paris Cité University in 2000, and graduated in French as a second language, specializing in Language Awareness in 2011 at Le Mans University and in children's literature in 2015 at the University of Artois.

She is an agrégée in Humanities.

== Career and research ==
=== Teaching ===
She taught French for 13 years, from 2004 to 2017, in a college in Saint-Nazaire. In 2017, she received the Palmes Académiques and stopped her teaching activity to devote herself full-time to writing.

Since June 2010, she became a freelance editor of educational materials for DYS adaptations (Dyslexia) and began writing fictions for publishing houses such as Casterman, Castelmore, Thierry Magnier, Gulf Stream, Hachette, and Gallimard.

=== Children's literature ===
Sophie Ruhaud wrote some twenty internationally acclaimed children's novels, notably in Belgium, the Czech Republic, Poland and Latvia.

Her breakthrough work is the post-apocalyptic Moana adventure trilogy published by Castelmore (inspired by her year in Tahiti), which won the 2011 CRILJ First Novel Award. Her novel 8,848 mètres, published by Casterman and edited by Vincent Villeminot in 2020, is inspired by the story of her cousin Marion Chaygneaud-Dupuy, who lived in Tibet for 20 years and climbed Mount Everest 3 times.

In 2014, she co-wrote the novel 14-14 with Paul Beorn, published by Castelmore, which parallels the stories of two boys a century apart.

They continue their collaboration with the novel Lune Rousse, Les Loups-garous de Thiercelieux in November 2018, around the universe of the eponymous board game by Philippe des Pallières and Hervé Marly. Then, in 2021, they will work together on the historical fantasy novel La Dame des murs, published by Castelmore.

She also published three historical novels about various themes in French history: Adèle et les noces de la reine Margot (2015), Les Lettres volées (2016) and 42 jours (2017).

In 2019, her novel Pour un sourire de Milad in collaboration with illustrator Annie Carbo addresses the issue of welcoming unaccompanied minors. She diversified her activity towards the youngest and first readings, with On a tué la petite souris illustrated by Noëmie Chevalier and L'arbre-lit, her first album, illustrated by Gilles Freluche and published by La cabane bleue in 2020.

=== Adult literature ===
Silène Edgar published two novellas for an adult audience: Fortune Cookies, a short story of anticipation on the state of emergency, and Féelure, burlesque fantasy.

She also published Les Affamés (2019) at J'ai Lu (collection Nouveaux Millénaires), with a preface by Pierre Bordage, which describes a hygienist democraty with republican appearances, but hiding a regime prone to censorship and violence.

In 2019, she published an auto-fiction, Ce Caillou dans ma chaussure, linked to her teenager novel Pour un sourire de Milad, on the theme of isolated minors.

In an interview in 2022, Silène Edgar announced her upcoming projects.

=== Other activities ===
She lives near Saint-Émilion.

Silène Edgar also worked with a circle of writers who were friends. In particular, she founded the website Callioprofs with a group of authors from her high school, she and Cindy van Wilder being the main columnists.

She trained in a variety of subjects, like the introduction to screenwriting at La Fémis (2017), cultural mediation, etc. From 2009 to 2013, she was a permanent volunteer at the Cocyclics association, a place of art and culture for authors of the imaginary created in 2007 where she managed the forum on a daily basis, organized and intervened in literary events in person and remotely. In 2017, she produced the documentary sequence Céleste, ma planète, a philosophical tale about ecology by Timothée de Fombelle.

She is also known for her research activity, initiated during her master's dissertations and which she resumed for the conference "Fantasy and History" of the fantasy festival Les Imaginales at Épinal, on the theme of Harry Potter and its link to witch hunts, social protest and anti-fascism. She also moderated the festival for several years with Élise Dattin. In 2019, she became educational coordinator and editor of the fantasy pedagogy site of the National Library of France (BnF).

As part of the Tandem de Nevers festival, she participated in a workshop with Maëlig Duval.

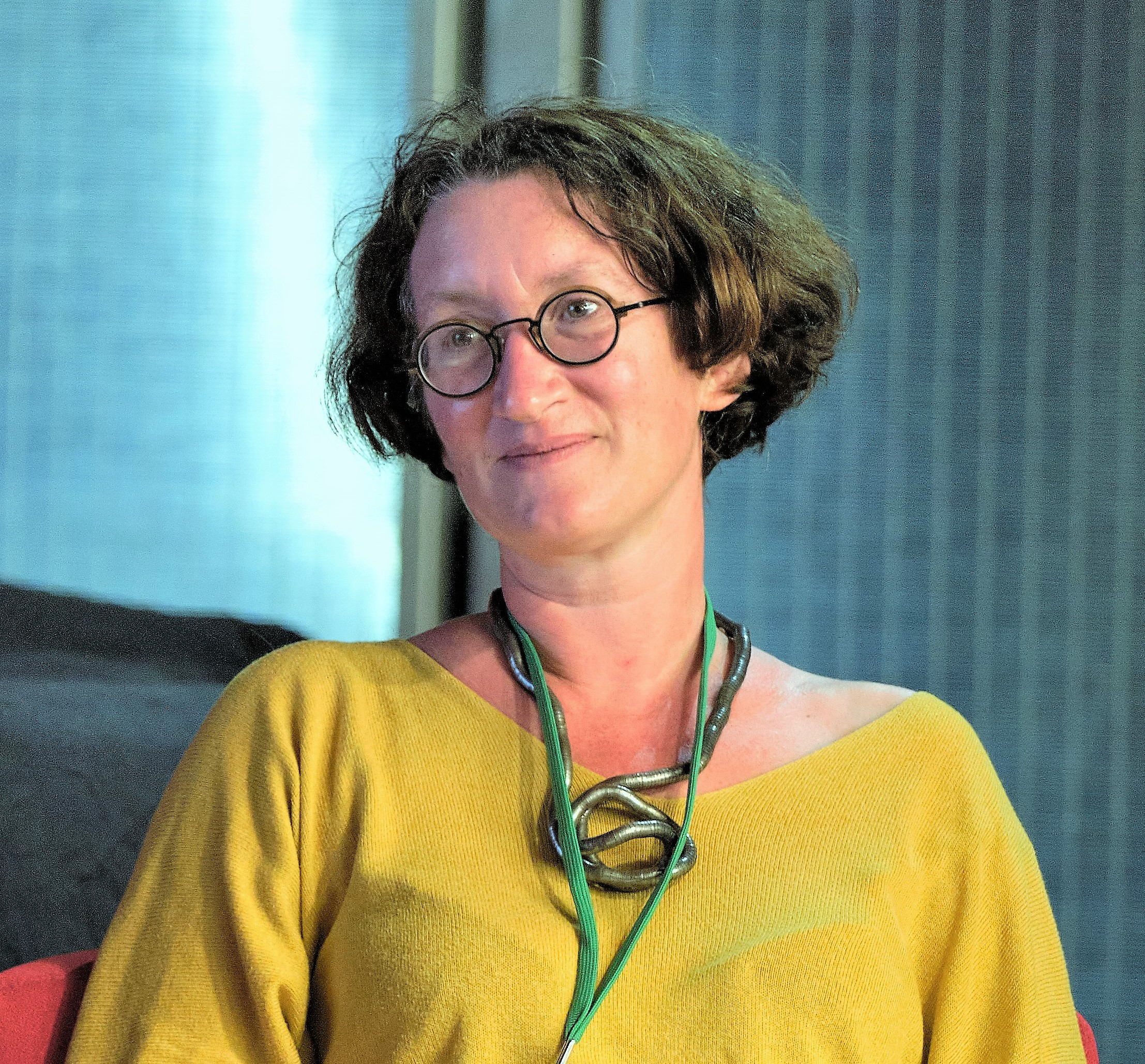
Silène Edgar at the Hypermondes festival in 2021

== Works ==
=== Fiction ===
==== For youth ====
- 2010: Moana, tome 1. La saveur des figues (in French). France: Castelmore.
- 2011: Moana, tome 2. Le bateau vagabond (in French). France: Castelmore.
- 2013: Moana, tome 3. A la source des nuages (in French). France: Castelmore.
- 2014: Le manoir en folie. Imaginemos jeunesse (in French). Issy-les-Moulineaux. 25 September 2014. ISBN 9791091233286.
- 2014: 14-14 (in French). Castelmore. 2016. ISBN 9782362311932.
- 2015: Adèle et les noces de la reine Margot (in French). Castelmore. 24 April 2015. ISBN 9782362311451.
- 2016: Les Lettres volées 1661. Mademoiselle de Sévigné au temps du Roi-Soleil (in French). Castelmore.
- 2017: 42 jours (in French). Castelmore. 10 April 2019. ISBN 9782362316821.
- 2018: Edgar, Silène; Beorn, Paul (14 November 2018). Les loups-garous de Thiercelieux : lune rousse. Castelmore. ISBN 9782362312076.
- 2019: Un sourire pour Milad (in French). Scrineo.
- 2021: Edgar, Silène; Paul Beorn (2021). La Dame des Murs 1961-2021. Derrière le Mur, la magie au cœur des souvenirs (in French). Castelmore. ISBN 9782362317538.
- 2021: Les animaux de Mini-Bois 1. Le Cookie empoisonné (in French). Charline Picard. Casterman. 2021. ISBN 978-2-203-22254-0.
- 2021: Les animaux de Mini-Bois 2. Le Trésor du marais (in French). Charline Picard. Casterman. 2021. ISBN 978-2-203-22423-0.
- 2022: Les animaux de mini-bois 3. Le Chemin des étoiles (in French). Charline Picard. Casterman. 2022. ISBN 978-2203236608.

==== For adults ====
- 2012: Les moelleuses au chocolat. Nouvelles fantastiques (in French). du Jasmin. 2012. ISBN 9782352842071.
- 2014: Fortune Cookies (in French). Bragelonne-Snark. 2014. ISBN 979-10-281-1421-3.
- 2014: Féelure (in French). Bragelonne-Snark. 2014. ISBN 9791028102197.
- 2015: Silène, Edgar. Le troll médecin (in French). Editions Mille Cent Quinze. ISBN 979-10-97100-84-1.
- 2018: "Plénitude". Anthologie Dimension Technosciences @venir - Rivière Blanche (in French). 2018. ISBN 9791097100841.
- 2019: Les Affamés. Nouveaux Millénaires (in French). J'ai Lu. 2019. ISBN 978-2227494572.
- 2019: Ce caillou dans ma chaussure : l'histoire de Salim (in French). Le Cellier : Géphyre. 2019. ISBN 9782490418244.
- 2019: "Inconnue à cette adresse". Utopiales 19, ActuSF, Les Trois Souhaits (in French). 2019. ISBN 9791097100841.
- 2021: Edgar, Silène (2021). "Espoir". Par-delà l'Horizon, ActuSF, Les Trois Souhaits (in French). Les Éditions Mille Cent Quinze. ISBN 9791097100841.

=== Youth album ===
- 2020: On a tué la petite souris. Les coups de cœur (in French). Noëmie Chevalier. Scrineo. 2020. ISBN 9782367408347.
- 2020: L'arbre-lit (in French). Gilles Freluche. La Cabane bleue. 2020. ISBN 9782491231040.
- 2022: Louise Cigogne (in French). Romain Ronzeau. Castelmore. 2022. ISBN 9782362314216.

=== Articles ===
- 2010: with Paul Beorn, Agnès Marto & all. (24 May 2019) [2010]. Le Grimoire Galactique des Grenouilles, guide des éditeurs de l'imaginaire (in French) (4 ed.). Association Tremplins de l'Imaginaire. ISBN 978-2-9543322-2-2.
- 2014: Une histoire du théâtre jeune public. 6 (in French). Les Cahiers du CRILJ. November 2014.
- 2018: Anne Besson (2018). ""Contes", "J.K. Rowling", "Fantasy jeunesse"". Dictionnaire de la fantasy (in French) (1 ed.). Vendemiaire. ISBN 9782363583154. Prix du jury des Imaginales 2019
- 2019: L'Histoire dans l'histoire : chasse aux sorcières, contestation sociale et anti-fascisme dans Harry Potter (in French). 2019.
