= Floriane Soulas =

French science fiction and fantasy author

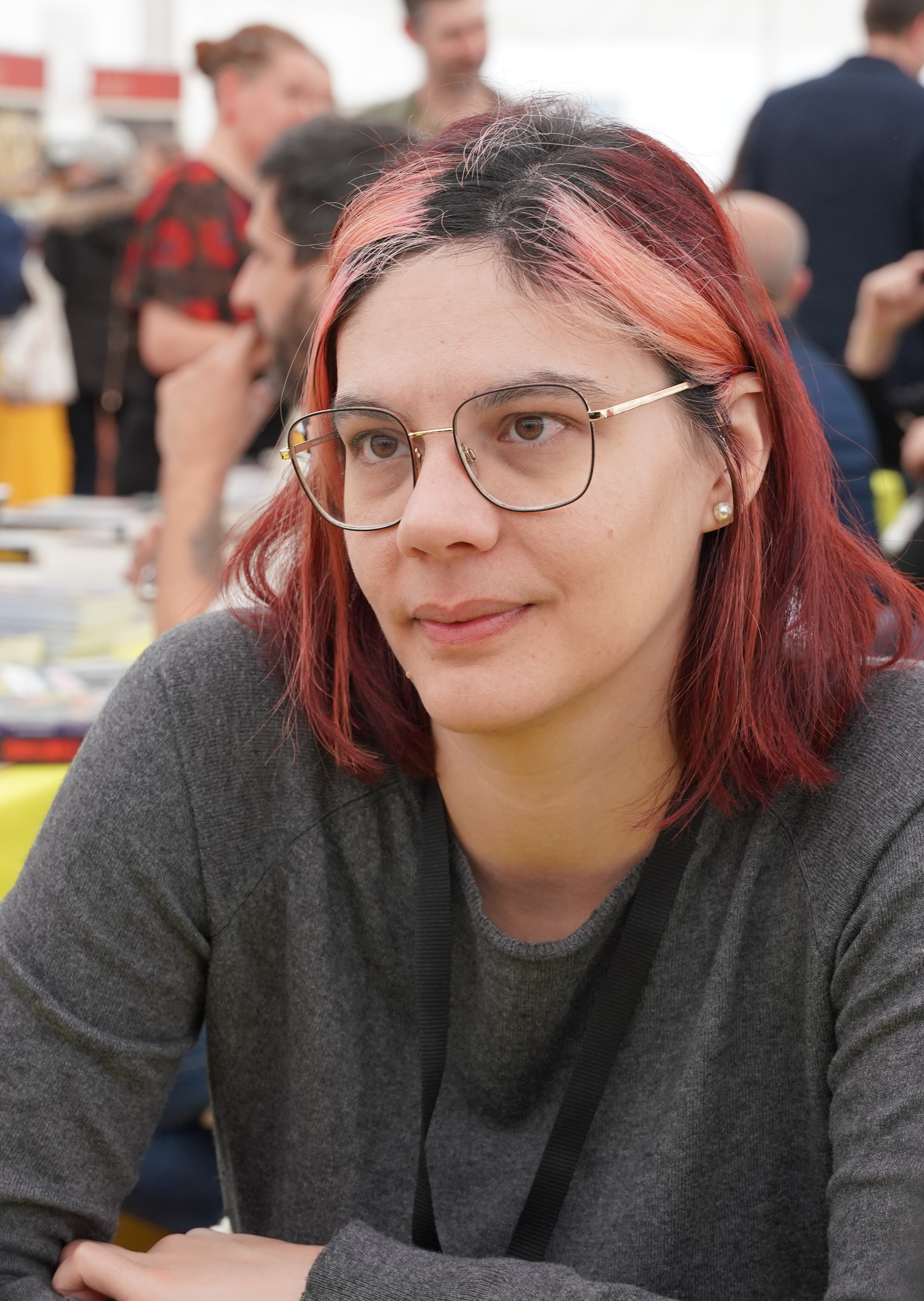
- Floriane Soulas during the fr:Le Livre à Metz event.
- Born: 1989 (age 36–37)
- Occupation: novelist
- Writing career
- Subjects: Science fiction; Fantasy
- Notable works: Les oubliés de l'amas; Rouille; les noces de la renarde
- Notable awards: fr:Prix ActuSF de l'uchronie; fr:Prix européen Utopiales des pays de la Loire; fr:Prix Imaginales

Floriane Soulas (born 1989 in Paris), is a French fantasy and science fiction novelist and short story writer, particularly in the steampunk and space opera subgenres. She began publishing in 2014, and has won several awards since 2018.

== Biography ==
Born in Paris in 1989, Floriane Soulas attended a preparatory class and then an engineering school, the École des Mines de Carmaux. She then completed a thesis in mechanical and material engineering in 2016. Alongside her career as a mechanical engineer, she writes science fiction short stories. Her childhood reading and inspirations include Émile Zola, Victor Hugo and Albert Camus, as well as fantasy works by J. R. R. Tolkien and David Gemmell, and science fiction by Isaac Asimov and George Orwell.

She published her first novel, Rouille in 2018. The book follows a prostitute's investigation into a series of murders in steampunk Paris. It was awarded the ActuSF award for uchronia in the Literature category, the Imaginales award for high school students, and a Chrysalis award from the European Science Fiction Society.

Her second novel, Les Noces de la renarde, was published in 2019 and takes place in medieval fantasy Japan. The novel was nominated for the Elbakin award and won the Ouest Hurlant – Livre de poche award 2022.

In 2020, Floriane Soulas was awarded the ‘Coup de Coeur’ at the Les Imaginales festival, in recognition of a promising young author. As the festival did not take place during the COVID-19 pandemic, she was named again Coup de Coeur for the 2021 edition.

Her third novel, the space opera Les Oubliés de l'Amas, was published in 2021. The plot takes place in a kind of pirate city built from waste orbiting Jupiter. The novel draws inspiration from Asimov's robots, Star Wars' racing cars and Mass Effect's stations. The novel was nominated for the Prix Rosny-Aîné 2022 and won the Prix européen Utopiales des pays de la Loire 2022. While this book was published in paperback in 2023 by Pocket Imaginaire, under the ‘Rising Stars of the Imaginary’ label offered by publisher Charlotte Volper, Floriane Soulas also published the same year Tonnerre après les ruines, a post-apocalyptic novel, by Argyll.

== Awards ==
- Prix Imaginales des Lycéens 2019
- Prix Chrysalis – European Science Fiction Society 2019
- Prix ActuSF 2018
- Prix utopiales 2022

== Works ==
- Rouille,
- Les Noces de Renarde, Scrineo 2019
- Les Oubliés de l'Amas, 2021
- Tonnerre après les ruines, 2023
- Soma, 2025
