= Cauchy's limit theorem =

Mathematical theorem

Cauchy's limit theorem, named after the French mathematician Augustin-Louis Cauchy, describes a property of converging sequences. It states that for a converging sequence the sequence of the arithmetic means of its first $n$ members converges against the same limit as the original sequence, that is $(a_n)$ with $a_n\to a$ implies $(a_1+\cdots+a_n) / n \ \to a$. The theorem was found by Cauchy in 1821, subsequently a number of related and generalized results were published, in particular by Otto Stolz (1885) and Ernesto Cesàro (1888).

== Related results and generalizations ==
If the arithmetic means in Cauchy's limit theorem are replaced by weighted arithmetic means those converge as well. More precisely for sequence $(a_n)$ with $a_n\to a$ and a sequence of positive real numbers $(p_n)$ with $\frac{1}{p_1+\cdots+p_n} \to 0$ one has $\frac{p_1a_1+\cdots+p_na_n}{p_1+\cdots+p_n}\to a$.

This result can be used to derive the Stolz–Cesàro theorem, a more general result of which Cauchy's limit theorem is a special case.

For the geometric means of a sequence a similar result exists. That is for a sequence $(a_n)$ with $a_n>0$ and $a_n\to a$ one has $\sqrt[n]{a_1 \cdot a_2\cdot \cdots \cdot a_n} \ \to a$.

The arithmetic means in Cauchy's limit theorem are also called Cesàro means. While Cauchy's limit theorem implies that for a convergent series its Cesàro means converge as well, the converse is not true. That is the Cesàro means may converge while the original sequence does not. Applying the latter fact on the partial sums of a series allows for assigning real values to certain divergent series and leads to the concept of Cesàro summation and summable series. In this context Cauchy's limit theorem can be generalised into the Silverman–Toeplitz theorem.

== Proof ==
Let $\varepsilon>0$ and $N \in \N$ such that $|a_k - a| \leq \tfrac{\varepsilon}{2}$ for all $k \geq N$. Due to $\lim_{n \to \infty} \frac{1}{n} \sum_{k=1}^N (a_k - a) = 0$ there exists a $M \in \N$ with $\left|\frac{1}{n} \sum_{k=1}^N (a_k - a)\right| \leq \frac{\varepsilon}{2}$ for all $n \geq M$ .

Now for all $n \geq \max(N,M)$ the above yields:

$$\begin{align}
\left|\frac{1}{n} \left(\sum_{k=1}^n a_k\right) - a\right|
& = \left|\frac{1}{n} \sum_{k=1}^n (a_k - a)\right|
= \left|\frac{1}{n} \sum_{k=1}^N (a_k - a) + \frac{1}{n} \sum_{k=N+1}^n (a_k - a)\right| \\
& \leq \left|\frac{1}{n} \sum_{k=1}^N (a_k - a)\right| + \frac{1}{n} \sum_{k=N+1}^n |a_k - a| \leq \frac{\varepsilon}{2} + \frac{(n-N)\varepsilon}{2n}
\leq \varepsilon.
\end{align}$$
