= Wildy Petoud =

Swiss science fiction writer (born 1957)

Wildy Petoud (born 1957) is a Swiss science fiction writer who won the Prix Rosny-Aîné in 1993. She also wrote the story Nocturne with Emmanuel Jouanne and translated a story by Jean-Claude Dunyach for On Spec.
