= Roland Stoltz =

Roland Stoltz may refer to:

- Roland Stoltz (ice hockey, born 1931) (1931–2001), Swedish ice hockey defenceman
- Roland Stoltz (ice hockey, born 1954) (born 1954), retired Swedish ice hockey defenceman

== See also ==
- Stoltz (disambiguation)
