= Stolz =

Stolz is a German surname. Notable people with the surname include:

- Alban Stolz (1808–1883), German theologian
- Alexander Stolz (born 1983), German football goalkeeper
- Anna Stolz (born 1982), German politician
- Daniel Stolz von Stolzenberg (Daniel Stolcius) (1600–1660), Bohemian physician and writer on alchemy
- Denny Stolz (1933–2023), American football coach
- Diana Stolz (born 1976), German politician
- Dominik Stolz (born 1990), German footballer playing for Luxembourgish side F91 Dudelange
- Friedrich Stolz (1860–1936), German chemist
- Hilde von Stolz (1903–1973), Austrian-German actress
- Jordan Stolz (born 2004), American speed skater
- Joseph Stolz (1861–1941), American rabbi
- Karsten Stolz (1964–2025), German shot putter
- Kim Stolz (born 1983), U.S. fashion model and television personality
- Luca Stolz (born 1995), German professional race car driver
- Mary Stolz (1920–2006), U.S. writer of young adult fiction
- Monika Stolz (born 1951), German politician
- Otto Stolz (1842–1905), Austrian mathematician (Stolz–Cesàro theorem)
- Robert Stolz (1880–1975), Austrian composer and conductor
- Sylvia Stolz (born 1963), German lawyer and Holocaust denier
- Teresa Stolz (1834–1902), Italian opera soprano of Czech descent

== See also ==
- Stolze, surname
- Stoltz, surname
