= Cauchy theorem =

Cauchy theorem may refer to:

- Cauchy's integral theorem in complex analysis, also Cauchy's integral formula
- Cauchy's mean value theorem in real analysis, an extended form of the mean value theorem
- Cauchy's theorem (group theory)
- Cauchy's theorem (geometry) on rigidity of convex polytopes
- The Cauchy–Kovalevskaya theorem concerning partial differential equations
- The Cauchy–Peano theorem in the study of ordinary differential equations
- Cauchy's limit theorem
- Cauchy's argument principle
- Poincaré separation theorem, also known as the Cauchy interlacing theorem
