= Cesàro summation =

Modified summation method applicable to some divergent series

In mathematical analysis, Cesàro summation assigns values to some infinite sums that are not necessarily convergent in the usual sense. The Cesàro sum, also known as the Cesàro mean or Cesàro limit, is defined as the limit, as n tends to infinity, of the sequence of arithmetic means of the first n partial sums of the series.

This special case of a matrix summability method is named for the Italian analyst Ernesto Cesàro (1859–1906).

== Definition ==
Let $(a_n)_{n=1}^\infty$ be a sequence, and let
$$s_k = a_1 + \cdots + a_k= \sum_{n=1}^k a_n$$
be its kth partial sum.

The sequence (a_{n}) is called Cesàro summable, with Cesàro sum A ∈ $\mathbb{R}$, if, as n tends to infinity, the arithmetic mean of its first n partial sums s_{1}, s_{2}, ..., s_{n} tends to A:
$$\lim_{n\to\infty} \frac{1}{n}\sum_{k=1}^n s_k = A.$$

The value of the resulting limit is called the Cesàro sum of the series $\textstyle\sum_{n=1}^\infty a_n.$ If this series is convergent, then it is Cesàro summable and its Cesàro sum is the usual sum.

== Examples ==
=== First example ===
Let a_{n} = (−1)^{n} for n ≥ 0. That is, $(a_n)_{n=0}^\infty$ is the sequence
$$(1, -1, 1, -1, \ldots).$$
Let G denote the series
$$G = \sum_{n=0}^\infty a_n = 1-1+1-1+1-\cdots$$
The series G is known as Grandi's series.

Let $(s_k)_{k=0}^\infty$ denote the sequence of partial sums of G:
$$\begin{align}
s_k &= \sum_{n=0}^k a_n \\
(s_k) &= (1, 0, 1, 0, \ldots).
\end{align}$$

This sequence of partial sums does not converge, so the series G is divergent. However, G is Cesàro summable. Let $(t_n)_{n=1}^\infty$ be the sequence of arithmetic means of the first n partial sums:
$$\begin{align}
t_n &= \frac{1}{n}\sum_{k=0}^{n-1} s_k \\
(t_n) &= \left(\frac{1}{1}, \frac{1}{2}, \frac{2}{3}, \frac{2}{4}, \frac{3}{5}, \frac{3}{6}, \frac{4}{7}, \frac{4}{8}, \ldots\right).
\end{align}$$
Then
$$\lim_{n\to\infty} t_n = 1/2,$$
and therefore, the Cesàro sum of the series G is 1/2.

=== Second example ===
As another example, let a_{n} = n for n ≥ 1. That is, $(a_n)_{n=1}^\infty$ is the sequence
$$(1, 2, 3, 4, \ldots).$$

Let G now denote the series
$$G = \sum_{n=1}^\infty a_n = 1+2+3+4+\cdots .$$

Then the sequence of partial sums $(s_k)_{k=1}^\infty$ is
$$(1, 3, 6, 10, \ldots).$$

Since the sequence of partial sums grows without bound, the series G diverges to infinity. The sequence (t_{n}) of means of partial sums of GG is
$$\left(\frac{1}{1}, \frac{4}{2}, \frac{10}{3}, \frac{20}{4}, \ldots\right).$$

This sequence diverges to infinity as well, so G is not Cesàro summable. In fact, for the series of any sequence which diverges to (positive or negative) infinity, the Cesàro method also leads to the series of a sequence that diverges likewise, and hence such a series is not Cesàro summable.

== (C, α) summation ==
In 1890, Ernesto Cesàro stated a broader family of summation methods which have since been called (C, α) for non-negative integers α. The (C, 0) method is just ordinary summation, and (C, 1) is Cesàro summation as described above.

The higher-order methods can be described as follows: given a series Σa_{n} define the quantities
$$\begin{align} A_n^{-1}&=a_n \\ A_n^\alpha&=\sum_{k=0}^n A_k^{\alpha-1} \end{align}$$
(where the upper indices do not denote exponents) and define $E_n^\alpha$ to be $A_n^\alpha$ for the series 1 + 0 + 0 + 0 + .... Then the "(C, α)-sum" of Σa_{n} is denoted by (C, α)-Σa_{n} (using a notational hyphen, not an operational minus sign, between "(C, α)" and "Σa_{n}") and has the value
$$(\mathrm{C},\alpha)\text{-}\sum_{j=0}^\infty a_j=\lim_{n\to\infty}\frac{A_n^\alpha}{E_n^\alpha}$$
if it exists. This description represents an α-times iterated application of the initial summation method and can be restated as
$$\begin{align}
(\mathrm{C},\alpha)\text{-}\sum_{j=0}^\infty a_j &= \lim_{n\to\infty} \sum_{j=0}^n \frac{\binom{n}{j}}{\binom{n+\alpha}{j}} a_j\\&=\lim_{n\to\infty}\sum_{j=0}^n\frac{\left(n-j+1\right)_\alpha}{\left(n+1\right)_\alpha}a_j\text{.}
\end{align}$$

Even more generally, for $\alpha \in \mathbb{R} \operatorname{\backslash} \mathbb{Z}^{-}$, let $\textstyle A_n^\alpha$ be implicitly given by the coefficients of the series
$$\sum_{n=0}^\infty A_n^\alpha x^n=\frac{\displaystyle{\sum_{n=0}^\infty a_nx^n}}{(1-x)^{1+\alpha}},$$
and $E_n^\alpha$ as above. In particular, $E_n^\alpha$ are the binomial coefficients of power −1 − α. Then the (C, α)-sum of Σa_{n} is defined as above.

If Σa_{n} has a (C, α)-sum, then it also has a (C, β)-sum for every β > α, and the sums agree; furthermore, using little-o notation we have a_{n} = o(n^{α}) if α > −1.

== Cesàro summability of an integral ==
Let α ≥ 0. The integral $\textstyle\int_0^\infty f(x)\,dx$ is (C, α)-summable if
$$\lim_{\lambda\to\infty}\int_0^\lambda\left(1-\frac{x}{\lambda}\right)^\alpha f(x)\, dx$$

exists and is finite. The value of this limit, should it exist, is the (C, α)-sum of the integral. Analogously to the case of the sum of a series, if α = 0, the result is convergence of the improper integral. In the case α = 1, (C, 1) convergence is equivalent to the existence of the limit
$$\lim_{\lambda\to \infty}\frac{1}{\lambda}\int_0^\lambda \int_0^x f(y)\, dy\,dx$$
which is the limit of means of the partial integrals.

As is the case with series, if an integral is (C, α)-summable for some value of α ≥ 0, then it is also (C, β)-summable for all β > α, and the value of the resulting limit is the same.

== See also ==
- Abel summation
- Abel's summation formula
- Abel–Plana formula
- Abelian and tauberian theorems
- Almost convergent sequence
- Borel summation
- Divergent series
- Euler summation
- Euler–Boole summation
- Fejér's theorem
- Hölder summation
- Lambert summation
- Perron's formula
- Ramanujan summation
- Riesz mean
- Silverman–Toeplitz theorem
- Stolz–Cesàro theorem
- Cauchy's limit theorem
- Summation by parts
