= Stölzel =

Stölzel is a surname. Notable people with the surname include:

- Gottfried Heinrich Stölzel (1690–1749), German baroque composer
- Heinrich Stölzel (1777–1844), German horn player
- Ingrid Stölzel (born 1971), German composer of classical music

== See also ==
- Stolze
