= Prix Rosny-Aîné =

The Prix Rosny-Aîné is a literary prize for French science fiction. It has been awarded annually since 1980 in two categories: best novel and best short fiction.

== Best Novel Winners ==
- 1980 : Michel Jeury, for Le territoire humain
- 1981 : Michel Jeury, for Les yeux géants
- 1982 : Elisabeth Vonarburg, for Le silence de la cité
- 1983 : Emmanuel Jouanne, for Damiers imaginaires
- 1984 : Jean-Pierre Hubert, for Le champ du rêveur
- 1985 : Emmanuel Jouanne, for Ici-bas
- 1986 : Jean-Pierre Hubert, for Ombromanies
- 1987 : Francis Berthelot, for La ville au fond de l'œil
- 1988 : (tied) Joëlle Wintrebert, for Les olympiades truquées
- 1988 : (tied) Roland C. Wagner, for Le serpent d'angoisse
- 1989 : Roland C. Wagner, for Poupée aux yeux morts
- 1990 : Yves Fremion, for L'hétéradelphe de Gane
- 1991 : Pierre Stolze, for Cent mille images
- 1992 : Jean-Claude Dunyach, for Étoiles mortes (Aigue Marine/Nivôse)
- 1993 : Alain Le Bussy, for Deltas
- 1994 : Richard Canal, for Ombres blanches
- 1995 : Richard Canal, for Aube noire
- 1996 : Maurice Dantec, for Les Racines du mal
- 1997 : Serge Lehman, for F.A.U.S.T.
- 1998 : Roland C. Wagner, for L'odyssée de l'espèce
- 1999 : Jean-Marc Ligny, for Jihad
- 2000 : Michel Pagel, for L'équilibre des paradoxes
- 2001 : Johan Heliot, for La Lune seule le sait
- 2002 : Laurent Genefort, for Omale
- 2003 : Joëlle Wintrebert, for Pollen
- 2004 : Roland C. Wagner, for La Saison de la Sorcière
- 2005 : Xavier Mauméjean, for La Vénus anatomique
- 2006 : Catherine Dufour, for Le Goût de l'immortalité
- 2007 : Jean-Marc Ligny, for Aqua TM
- 2008 : Élise Fontenaille, for Unica
- 2009 : Xavier Mauméjean, for Lilliputia
- 2010 : Ugo Bellagamba, for Tancrède. Une uchronie
- 2011 : Laurent Whale, for Les Pilleurs d'Âmes
- 2012 : Roland C. Wagner, for Rêves de gloire
- 2013 : Laurent Genefort, for Points chauds
- 2014 : Ayerdhal, for Rainbow Warriors and L. L. Kloetzer, for Anamnèse de Lady Star (ex-æquo)
- 2015 : Ayerdhal, for Bastards
- 2016 : Laurent Genefort, for Lum'en
- 2017 : François Rouiller, for Métaquine®

== Best Short Fiction Winners ==
- 1980 : Joëlle Wintrebert, for La créode
- 1981 : (tied) Jacques Boireau, for Chronique de la vallée
- 1981 : (tied) Serge Brussolo, for Subway, éléments pour une mythologie du métro
- 1982 : Christine Renard, for La nuit des albiens
- 1983 : Roland C. Wagner, for Faire-part
- 1984 : Lionel Évrard, for Le clavier incendié
- 1985 : Jean-Pierre Hubert, pour Pleine peau
- 1986 : Sylvie Lainé, for Le chemin de la rencontre
- 1987 : Gérard Klein, for Mémoire morte
- 1988 : Jean-Pierre Hubert, for Roulette mousse
- 1989 : Francis Valéry, for Bumpie(TM)
- 1990 : Francis Valéry, for Les voyageurs sans mémoire
- 1991 : Raymond Milesi, for Extra-muros
- 1992 : Jean-Claude Dunyach, for L'autre côté de l'eau
- 1993 : Wildy Petoud, for Accident d'amour
- 1994 : Raymond Milesi, for L'heure du monstre
- 1995 : Serge Lehman, for Dans l'abîme
- 1996 : Serge Delsemme, for Voyage organisé
- 1997 : Roland C. Wagner, for H.P.L. (1890-1991)
- 1998 : Jean-Claude Dunyach, for Déchiffrer la trame
- 1999 : Jean-Jacques Nguyen, for L'amour au temps du silicium
- 2000 : Sylvie Denis, for Dedans, dehors
- 2001 : Claude Ecken, for La fin du big bang
- 2002 : Raymond Milesi, for Le sommeil de la libellule
- 2003 : (tied) Jean-Jacques Girardot, for Gris et amer 1 : Les Visiteurs de l'éclipse
- 2003 : (tied) Sylvie Lainé, for Un signe de Setty
- 2004 : Claude Ecken, for Fragments lumineux du disque d'accrétion
- 2005 : Ugo Bellagamba, for Chimères
- 2006 : Sylvie Lainé, for Les Yeux d'Elsa
- 2007 : Serge Lehman, for Origami
- 2008 : Jean-Claude Dunyach, for Repli sur soie
- 2009 : Jeanne-A Debats, for La Vieille Anglaise et le continent
- 2010 : Jérôme Noirez, for Terre de fraye
- 2011 : Timothée Rey, for Suivre à travers le bleu cet éclair puis cette ombre
- 2012 : Ugo Bellagamba, for Journal d'un poliorcète repenti
- 2013 : Ayerdhal, for RCW and Thomas Geha, for Les Tiges (ex-æquo)
- 2014 : Christian Léourier, for Le Réveil des hommes blancs
- 2015 : Sylvie Lainé, for L'Opéra de Shaya
- 2016 : Laurent Genefort, for Ethfrag
- 2017 : Estelle Faye, for Les anges tièdes
