= Christine Renard =

French writer (1929–1979)

Christine Renard (February 10, 1929 – November 7, 1979) was a French writer of science fiction and fantasy.

She was born in a small town of Nièvre. She began her studies in Clermont-Ferrand before studying psychology in Paris. Her literary career began in 1962, but was cut short by cancer. She won the Prix Rosny-Aîné posthumously for the story La nuit des albiens. She was the partner of Claude-François Cheinisse.

== Career ==
In 1972, Renard published La Fenêtre, a critique of antisemitism in science fiction set in an intergalactic future. One of her most famous short stories, Au Creux des Arches, published in 1975, juxtaposed a separatist feminist utopia with the dystopic environmental crisis of the late twentieth century.
