= Stoltz =

Stoltz is a surname from Stolz, a German noun meaning "pride".

- Conrad Stoltz (born 1973), South African athlete
- Eric Stoltz (born 1961), American actor
- Gösta Stoltz (1904–1963), Swedish chess grandmaster
- Kelley Stoltz (born 1971), American singer, songwriter and musician
- Robert Stoltz (born 1976), Swedish footballer
- Roland Stoltz (1931–2001), Swedish ice hockey player
- Roland Stoltz (born 1954), Swedish ice hockey player
- Rosine Stoltz (1815–1903), French opera singer

== See also ==
- Stolz
- Stolze
