= Hölder summation =

Method for summing divergent series

In mathematics, Hölder summation is a method for summing divergent series introduced by Hölder (1882).

== Definition ==
Given a series

$$a_1+a_2+\cdots,$$

define

$$H^0_n=a_1+a_2+\cdots+a_n$$
$$H^{k+1}_n=\frac{H^k_1+\cdots+H^k_n}{n}$$

If the limit

$$\lim_{n\rightarrow\infty}H^k_n$$

exists for some k, this is called the Hölder sum, or the (H,k) sum, of the series.

Particularly, since the Cesàro sum of a convergent series always exists, the Hölder sum of a series (that is Hölder summable) can be written in the following form:

$$\lim_{\begin{smallmatrix}
n\rightarrow\infty\\ k\rightarrow\infty
\end{smallmatrix}}H^k_n$$

== See also ==
- Cesàro summation
