= Johan Heliot =

French writer

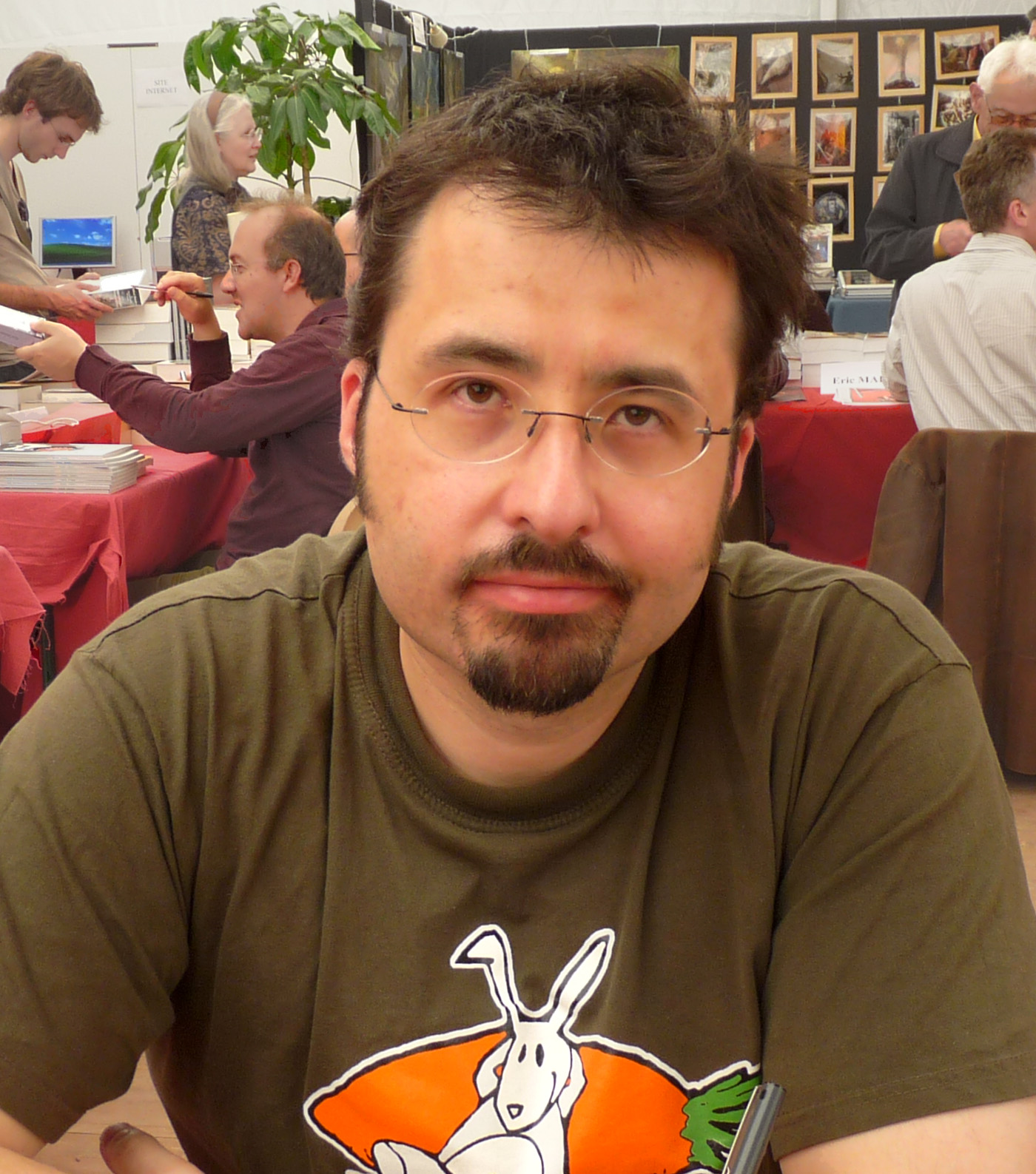

Johan Heliot (born 1970 in Besançon) is the pseudonym used by Stéphane Boillot-Cousin, a French science fiction writer. He is known for imaginative stories and has also written juvenile literature. One of his stories was translated into English for The Mammoth Book of New Jules Verne Adventures.

In 2001 he won the Prix Rosny-Aîné for La Lune seule le sait.
