= Stolze =

Stolze is a surname shared by the following individuals:

- Dorothy Stolze (1923–2003), All-American girls professional baseball league player
- Fritz Stolze (1910–1973), German water polo player
- Gerhard Stolze (1926–1979), German opera singer
- Greg Stolze (born 1970), American novelist and role-playing game writer
- Heinrich August Wilhelm Stolze (1798–1867), German stenographer
- Jim Stolze (born 1973), Dutch author
- Lena Stolze (born 1956), German actress
- Pierre Stolze (born 1952), French science fiction writer

Stolz is a German noun meaning "pride".

== See also ==
- Stolz
- Stoltz
