= Jean-Pierre Hubert =

Jean-Pierre Hubert (May 25, 1941 in Strasbourg – May 1, 2006 in Wissembourg) was a science fiction and detective fiction author. He won the Prix Rosny-Aîné several times and has been reviewed by Locus (magazine).

== Bibliography ==
- Planète à trois temps, Opta, 1975
- Mort à l'étouffée, Kesselring, 1978
- Couple de scorpions, Kesselring, 1980
- Scènes de guerre civile, Opta, 1982
- Le champ du rêveur, Denoël, 1983 (Prix Rosny-Aîné winner)
- Séméla, Plasma, 1983
- Les faiseurs d'orage, Denoël, 1984
- Ombromanies, Denoël, 1985 (Prix Rosny-Aîné winner) 1986
- Cocktail, Patrick Siry, 1988.
- Le bleu des mondes, Hachette Jeunesse, 1997
- Je suis la mort, Fleuve Noir, 1998
- Les cendres de Ligna, Mango Jeunesse, 2000
- Le lac des grimaces, Degliame, 2001
- Sa majesté des clones, Mango Jeunesse, 2002
- Les sonneurs noirs, Mango Jeunesse, 2004
- Sur les pistes de Scar, Mango Jeunesse, 2005
