= Ugo Bellagamba =

French writer and legal historian

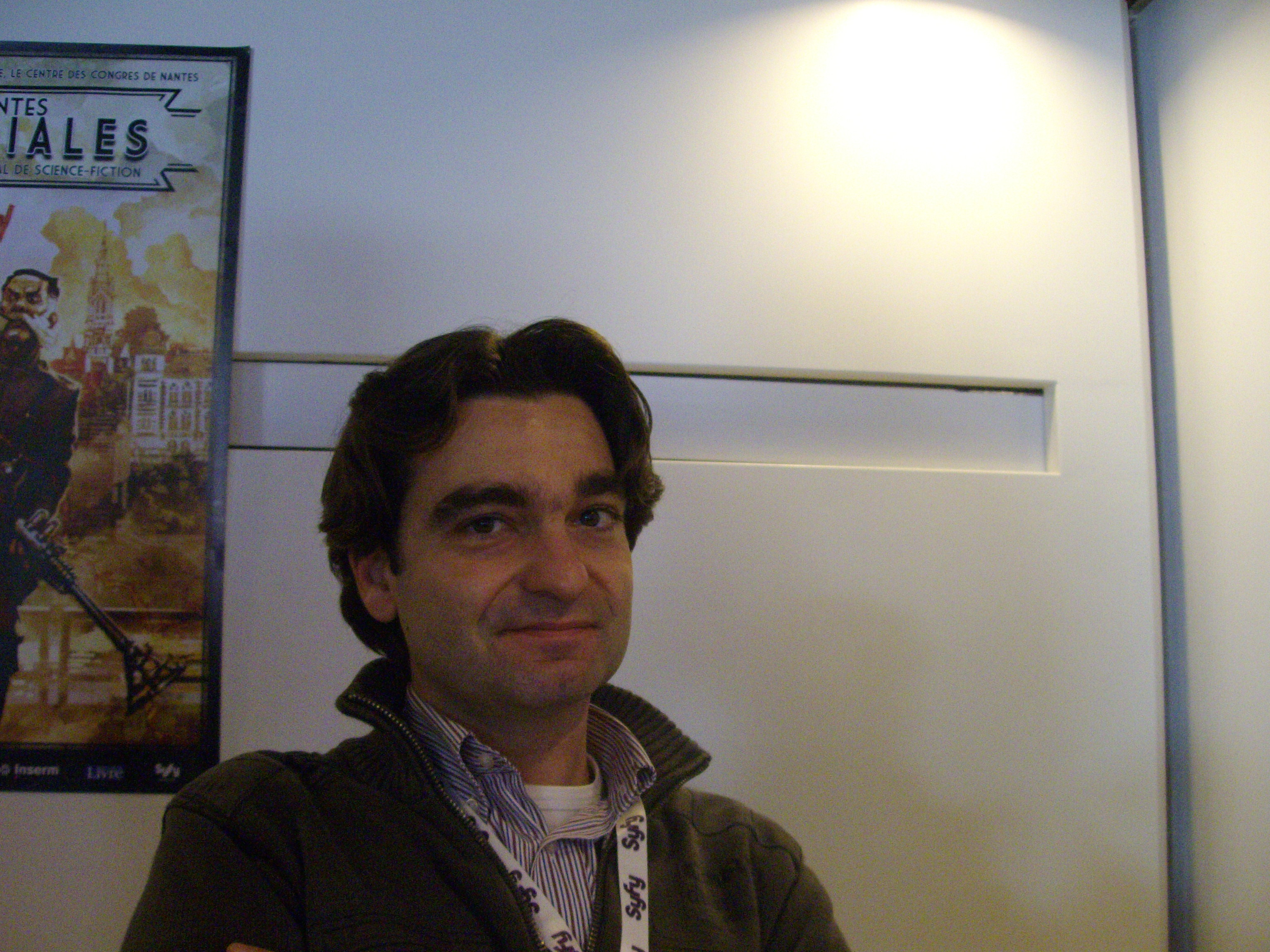
Ugo Bellagamba, Utopiales 2011

Ugo Bellagamba (born 1972) is a French science fiction writer who won the Prix Rosny-Aîné in 2005 (best short story) and 2010 (best novel : Tancrède, une uchronie), as well as the Grand Prix de l'Imaginaire in 2008 (best non fiction : Solutions non satisfaisante, une anatomie de Robert A. Heinlein). An associate professor at the Law school of the University of Nice, he teaches the history of law.
