= Banach limit =

Mathematical term

In mathematical analysis, a Banach limit is a continuous linear functional $\phi: \ell^\infty \to \mathbb{C}$ defined on the Banach space $\ell^\infty$ of all bounded complex-valued sequences such that for all sequences $x = (x_n)$, $y = (y_n)$ in $\ell^\infty$, and complex numbers $\alpha$:

1. $\phi(\alpha x+y) = \alpha\phi(x) + \phi(y)$ (linearity);
2. if $x_n\geq 0$ for all $n \in \mathbb{N}$, then $\phi(x) \geq 0$ (positivity);
3. $\phi(x) = \phi(Sx)$, where $S$ is the shift operator defined by $(Sx)_n=x_{n+1}$ (shift-invariance);
4. if $x$ is a convergent sequence, then $\phi(x) = \lim x$.

Hence, $\phi$ is an extension of the continuous functional $\lim: c \to \mathbb C$ where $c \subset\ell^\infty$ is the complex vector space of all sequences which converge to a (usual) limit in $\mathbb C$.

In other words, a Banach limit extends the usual limits, is linear, shift-invariant and positive. However, there exist sequences for which the values of two Banach limits do not agree. We say that the Banach limit is not uniquely determined in this case.

As a consequence of the above properties, a real-valued Banach limit also satisfies:

$$\liminf_ {n\to\infty} x_n \le \phi(x) \le \limsup_{n\to\infty} x_n.$$

The existence of Banach limits is usually proved using the Hahn–Banach theorem (analyst's approach), or using ultrafilters (this approach is more frequent in set-theoretical expositions). These proofs are inherently non-constructive, as they use the axiom of choice or similar concepts and are not provable in only Zermelo–Fraenkel set theory.

== Almost convergence ==
There are non-convergent sequences which have a uniquely determined Banach limit. For example, if $x=(1,0,1,0,\ldots)$, then $x+S(x) = (1,1,1,\ldots)$ is a constant sequence, and

$$2\phi(x) = \phi(x)+\phi(x) = \phi(x)+\phi(Sx) = \phi(x+Sx) = \phi((1,1,1,\ldots)) = \lim((1,1,1,\ldots)) = 1$$

holds. Thus, for any Banach limit, this sequence has limit $1/2$.

A bounded sequence $x$ with the property that for every Banach limit $\phi$ the value $\phi(x)$ is the same is called almost convergent.

== Banach spaces ==
Given a convergent sequence $x=(x_n)$ in $c \subset\ell^\infty$, the ordinary limit of $x$ does not arise from an element of $\ell^1$, if the duality $\langle\ell^1,\ell^\infty\rangle$ is considered. The latter means $\ell^\infty$ is the continuous dual space (dual Banach space) of $\ell^1$, and consequently, $\ell^1$ induces continuous linear functionals on $\ell^\infty$, but not all. Any Banach limit on $\ell^\infty$ is an example of an element of the dual Banach space of $\ell^\infty$ which is not in $\ell^1$. The dual of $\ell^\infty$ is known as the ba space, and consists of all (signed) finitely additive measures on the sigma-algebra of all subsets of the natural numbers, or equivalently, all (signed) Borel measures on the Stone–Čech compactification of the natural numbers.
