= Joëlle Wintrebert =

French writer (born 1949)

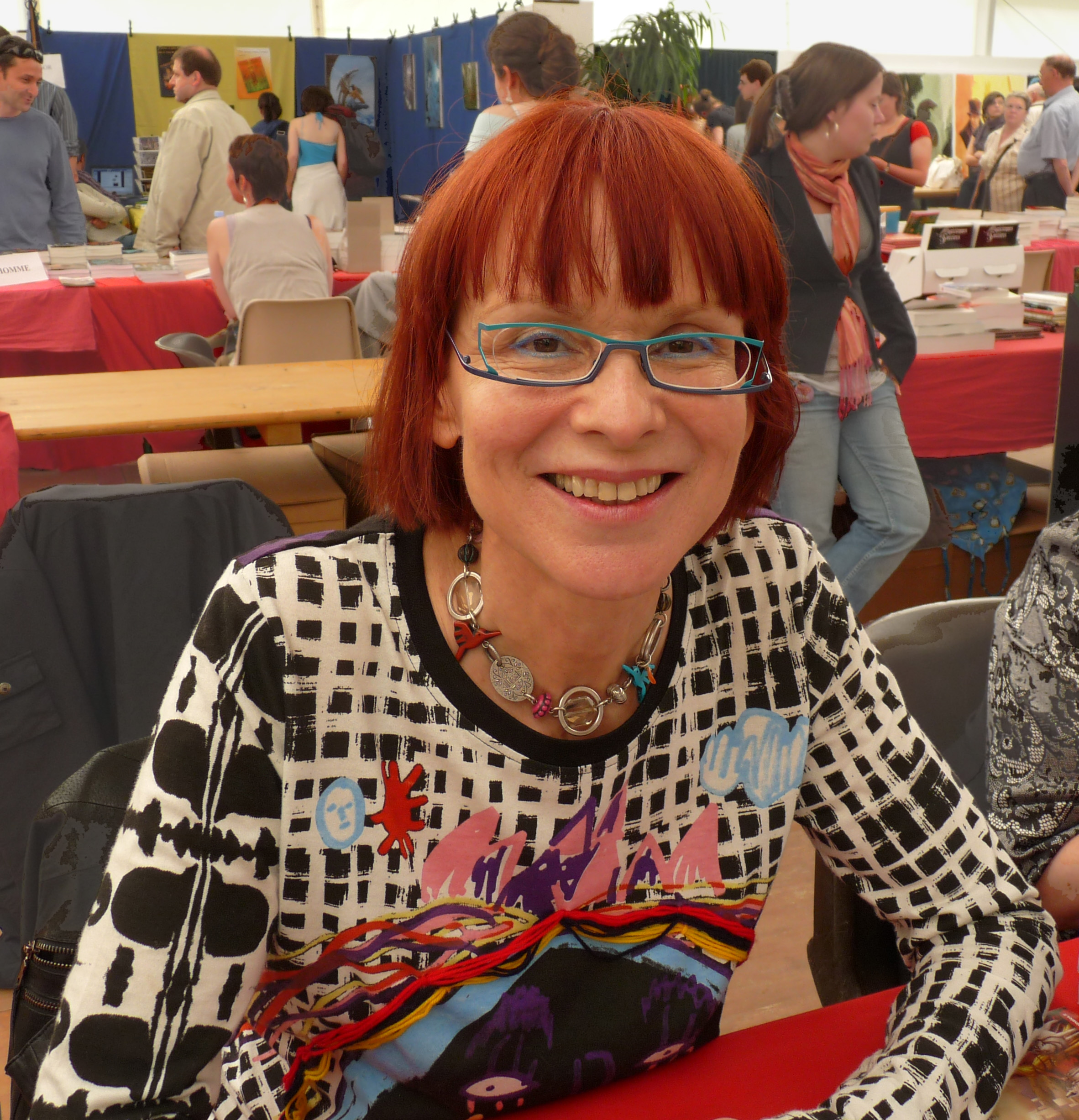
- Born: 1949 (age 76–77); Toulon, France
- Occupation: Author
- Writing career
- Genre: Science fiction
- Notable awards: Prix Rosny-Aîné
- Website: www.wintrebert.info

Joëlle Wintrebert is a French writer. She primarily writes science fiction, but also writes children's literature and journalism. She has won the Prix Rosny-Aîné three times, first in 1980. She also edited the anthology series Univers.

== Biography ==
Joëlle Wintrebert graduated in cinema from Paris VIII in 1971, and in literature from the same university in 1972.

She first worked in the audio-visual industry, handling tasks usually forgotten in the credits in television scripts, notably for Arpad, the Gypsy (1973–1974), Spartakus and the Sun Beneath the Sea and Rahan (1985–1987).

She then turned to journalism. She was editor of the French magazine Horizons du fantastique in 1975 and of the annual anthology Univers (magazine) from 1983 to 1985. It was during this period that she discovered science fiction. She wrote reviews and columns for a number of magazines, including Fiction, L'Inconnu, Creepy, Vampirella and L'Écho des savanes. She wrote a column on science fiction for À suivre until 1998.

She has also reviewed translations from Barbara Cartland. In 1979, 1980 and 1982, she was press officer for the Festival de la SF et de l'Imaginaire in Metz (France). In 1990, she was in charge of the regional press at the Angoulême International Comics Festival.

== Career in science fiction ==
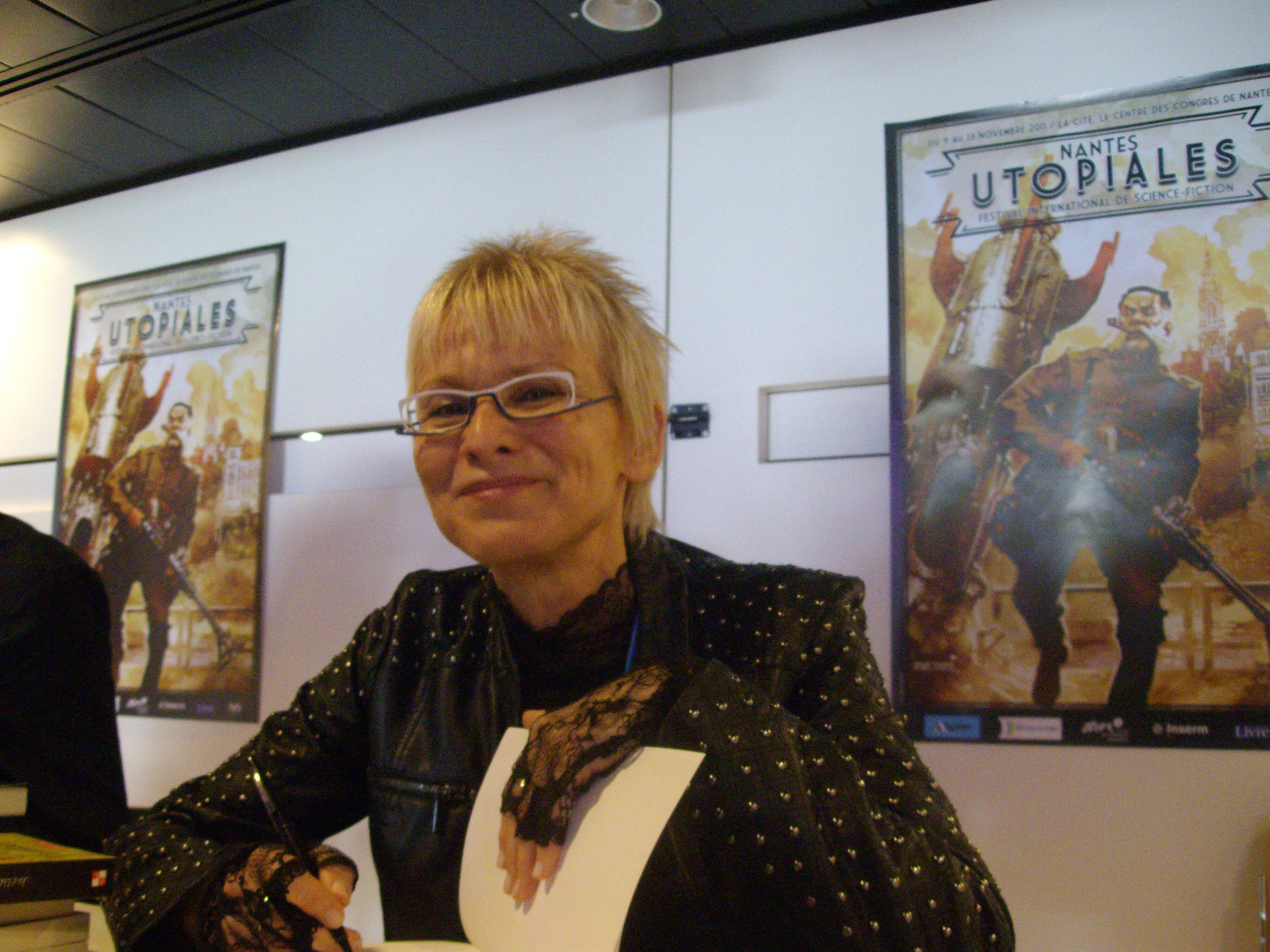
Joëlle Wintrebert at the Utopiales in 2014.

In the mid-1970s, she began publishing her first short stories in the magazines Horizons du fantastique and Alerte!.

She collaborated with her companion Henri Lehalle on L'Amie-nuit, a book of poetic texts and photos featuring the two authors, often nude, with a fantasy tinge. The book, produced in 1974, was due to be published by Éric Losfeld, but the latter was censored and the book was not published. An association published the book in 2010.

Les Olympiades truquées (1980, rewritten in 1987) and Bébé-miroir (1988) were created in parallel, and are two coming of age novels, each featuring teenage girls who have everything working against them. Les Olympiades truquées won the Prix Rosny aîné in 1988.

She has also written several novels for young people, the first of which was Nunatak, published in 1983. An adventure novel, it features children forced to engage in gladiator fights for the pleasure of adults. Comme un feu de sarments (1990) is also a coming of age novel as well as a historical novel with a political context, set during a winegrowers' revolt. In L'Océanide (1992), the Earthlings exploit the Océanides, humans who have evolved on an ocean planet. This relationship of domination is challenged by the love of a Terrine and an Oceanid.

Published in 1983, the adventure novel Les Maîtres-Feu, her first novel for J'ai lu, came as a surprise at the time, because its light-hearted, even amusing tone contrasted with the rest of the author's books.

Chromoville, a novel published in 1984, takes place in a dystopian city organized around castes, identified by colours: red for workers, blue for merchants, purple for town planners... The yellow hetaera are the only women with any power. For Roland C. Wagner :

this is without doubt the author's most accomplished creation of a universe, and certain passages are reminiscent of a hypothetical Jack Vance who knew the heat of the emotions

— Roland C. Wagner,

The novella Hétéros et Thanatos, published in Univers 1982, is according to Wagner :

at once poetic and unrelentingly dark

It follows the history of Sélen le chorège, one of the characters from Chromoville.

Le Créateur chimérique (1988) begins with the short story La Créode (Prix Rosny aîné 1988), in which she imagines humans reproducing by parthenogenesis. The book won the Grand prix de l'Imaginaire in 1989. It is often referred to as her science fiction masterpiece.

Her coming of age novel Les Diables blancs, published in 1993, starts during the Paris Commune and goes on in New Caledonia, in the same environment as La Colonie perdue published in 1998.

In 1999 she published a scientific thriller Lentement s'empoisonnent. The same year, she becomes a member of the jury for the French SF award Grand prix de l'Imaginaire.

Pollen, published in 2002 was awarded the prix Rosny aîné. In this novel, she questions the possibility of utopia. The title refers to the notion of Eden, while also constituting a humoristic nudge at her activity as an amateur beekeeper. The story follows three protagonists who each in their own specific way rebel against the established order which allows women kidnappings and gender inequality.

In 2005 she published Le Canari fantôme a fantasy novel about the Yellow Train in the Catalan Pyrenes.

In 2006 she explores a founding myth of Prague in the 8th century in her novel Les Amazones de Bohême. Set in the context of Charlemagne's invading troops, queen sur fond de menace des troupes de Libuše, surrounded by women, accepts the arrival of two evangelists. After her death, one of her army captains founds a city composed exclusively of women.

La Chambre de sable published in 2008 is a contemporary novel oscillating between realism and onirism.

In 2009 she published a book of short stories : La Créode et autres récits futurs.

In 2021, she was awarded the Prix Extraordinaire des Utopiales by the Utopiales festival for her entire literary career.

At the 2025 Eurocon she was honoured as a European Grandmaster in the ESFS Awards.

== Private life ==
Joëlle Wintrebert was an amateur beekeeper. In 2000, she was living in the region of Montpellier. Her partner Henri Lehalle, is a professor of psychology and author of multiple essays on science fiction. Together they wrote L'Amie-nuit.

== Selected publications ==
- —— (1987) [1980]. Les Olympiades truquées. Anticipation (in French). Paris: Fleuve noir. ISBN 978-2-265-03677-2.
- —— (1982). Les Maîtres-feu. J'ai lu. Paris: Éditions J'ai lu. ISBN 978-2-277-21408-3.
- ——; Salas, Nestor (1983). Nunatak. L'Ami de poche (in French). Paris: Casterman. ISBN 978-2-203-13657-1.
- ——; Chaland, Yves (1994) [1984]. Kidnapping en télétrans. Collection Je bouquine. Paris: Bayard éd. ISBN 978-2-227-72326-9.
- —— (1983). Chromoville. J'ai lu (in French). Paris: Éditions J'ai lu. ISBN 978-2-277-21576-9.
- —— (2014) [1987]. La Fille de Terre Deux. Flammarion. ISBN 978-2081341944.
- —— (1988). Bébé-miroir (in French).
- —— (1988). Le Créateur chimérique. J'ai lu (in French). Paris: J'ai lu. ISBN 978-2-277-22420-4.
- —— (1990). Comme un feu de sarments.
- —— (1998) [1992]. L'Océanide. Castor poche (in French). Paris: Flammarion. ISBN 978-2-08-164388-8.
- —— (1993). Les Diables blancs.
- —— (1996). Les Ouraniens de Brume.
- —— (1996). Hurlegriffe: nouvelles. Lettres-science-fiction (in French). Amiens Le Plessis-Brion: Encrage Destination crépuscule. ISBN 978-2-911576-00-3.
- —— (1998). La colonie perdue. Collection dirigée par Claude Gutman (in French). Paris: Seuil. ISBN 978-2-02-024583-8.
- —— (1998). Le Roi des limaces.
- —— (1998). Les Gladiateurs de Thulé.
- —— (1998). Le Vin de la colère.
- —— (1999). Lentement s'empoisonnent. Quark noir (in French). Paris: Flammarion. ISBN 978-2-08-067626-9.
- —— (2001). Petite anthologie de la science-fiction. Lecture en tête (in French). Toulouse: SEDRAP. ISBN 978-2-84117-345-7.
- ——; Bouët, François (2003). Un prince pour Yoan. Les contes du gecko (in French). Sommières: R. Pages. ISBN 978-2-84350-154-8.
- —— (2005). Le canari fantôme: roman. Collection Train jaune (in French). Baixas: Balzac éd. ISBN 978-2-913907-47-8.
- —— (2006). Les amazones de Bohême: roman (in French). Paris: R. Laffont. ISBN 978-2-221-09605-5.
- —— (2021). Pollen. Les poches du diable (in French). Vauvert: Au diable Vauvert. ISBN 979-10-307-0431-0.
