= Emmanuel Jouanne =

French science fiction writer

Emmanuel Jouanne (born 1960 in Caen; died 6 February 2008) was a French science fiction writer who won the Prix Rosny-Aîné twice. His first novel came out in 1982. He has collaborated with Yves Fremion on a series of political science fiction and was a member of a writer group called "Limite." He is also noted in France for translations of R. A. Lafferty and Philip K. Dick.

His interest in Philip K. Dick has found expression in the English speaking world as he has written on his influence on French science fiction.

== Bibliography ==
- (1982) Damiers imaginaires
- (1983) Nuage
- (1984) Ici-bas
- (1985) Dites-le avec des mots, with Jean-Pierre Vernay, nouvelles
- (1986) Tuez un salaud, with Yves Fremion
- (1987) Cruautés, nouvelles
- (1987) Le Rat débile et les rats méchants, with Yves Frémion
- (1987) C'est la danse des connards, avec Yves Fremion
- (1987) Two novelettes in Malgré le monde, a collection of Limite's work
- (1988) L'Âge de fer
- (1988) Rêve de chair, with Jacques Barbéri
- (1988) Le Rêveur de chats
- (1989) La Trajectoire de la taupe
- (1995) L'Hiver, aller et retour
- (1997) Berlin l'enchanteur, with Yves Frémion
- (1998) Kalachnikov, 1998.
- (1999) L'Inconnu de la ruelle
