= Almost convergent sequence =

A bounded real sequence $(x_n)$ is said to be almost convergent to $L$ if each Banach limit assigns the same value $L$ to the sequence $(x_n)$.

Lorentz proved that $(x_n)$ is almost convergent if and only if

$$\lim\limits_{p\to\infty} \frac{x_{n}+\ldots+x_{n+p-1}}p=L$$

uniformly in $n$.

The above limit can be rewritten in detail as

$$\forall \varepsilon>0 : \exists p_0 : \forall p>p_0 : \forall n : \left|\frac{x_{n}+\ldots+x_{n+p-1}}p-L\right|<\varepsilon.$$

Almost convergence is studied in summability theory. It is an example of a summability method which cannot be represented as a matrix method.
