= Ernesto Cesàro =

Italian mathematician (1859–1906)

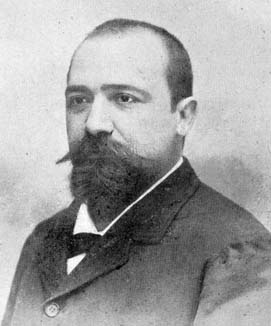
- Born: 12 March 1859; Naples, Kingdom of the Two Sicilies
- Died: 12 September 1906 (aged 47); Torre Annunziata, Italy
- Education: University of Liège; Sapienza University of Rome
- Known for: Stolz–Cesàro theorem Cesàro equation Cesàro mean Cesàro summation Cesàro curve
- Scientific career
- Fields: Mathematics
- Workplaces: University of Palermo; University of Naples Federico II
- Academic advisors: Eugène Charles Catalan

Ernesto Cesàro (12 March 1859 – 12 September 1906) was an Italian mathematician who worked in the field of differential geometry. He wrote a book, Lezioni di geometria intrinseca (Naples, 1896), on this topic, in which he also describes fractal, space-filling curves, partly covered by the larger class of de Rham curves, but are still known today in his honor as Cesàro curves. He is also known for his 'averaging' method for the Cesàro summation of divergent series, also known as the "Cesàro mean".

== Biography ==
After a rather disappointing start of his academic career and a journey through Europe—with the most important stop at Liège, where his older brother Giuseppe Raimondo Pio Cesàro was teaching mineralogy at the local university—Ernesto Cesàro graduated from the University of Rome in 1887, while he was already part of the Royal Science Society of Belgium for the numerous works that he had already published.

The following year, he obtained a mathematics chair at the University of Palermo, which he kept until 1891. He settled in Rome, where he remained as a professor at the Sapienza University until his accidental death, while trying to rescue his youngest son Manlio from drowning.

== Work ==
Cesàro's main contributions are in the field of differential geometry. His Lezioni di geometria intrinseca (Lessons in intrinsic geometry), written in 1894, explains in particular the construction of a fractal curve. After that, Cesàro also studied the "snowflake curve" of von Koch, which is continuous but not differentiable in any of its points.

Among his other works are Introduction to the mathematical theory of infinitesimal calculus (1893), Algebraic analysis (1894), Elements of infinitesimal calculus (1897). He proposed a possible definition of a limit of divergent sequence, known today as "Cesàro's sum," given by the limit of the mean of the sequence partial terms' sum.

== Books by E. Cesàro ==
- Lezioni di geometria intrinseca (Naples, 1896) ISBN 1-4297-0344-X (trans. into German under the title Vorlesungen über natürliche Geometrie; 1901, 1st edn.; 1926, 2nd edn. trans. and with an appendix by Gerhard Kowalewski)
- Elementi di calcolo infinitesimale con numerose applicazioni geometriche (L. Alvano, Naples, 1905) ISBN 1-4297-0178-1
- Corso di analisi algebrica con introduzione al calcolo infinitesimale (Bocca, Torino, 1894) ISBN 1-4297-0100-5

== See also ==
- Stolz–Cesàro theorem
- Cesàro's theorem
- Cesàro equation
- Cesàro mean
- Cesàro summation
- Cesàro curve
- Lévy C curve
