= Pierre Stolze =

French writer

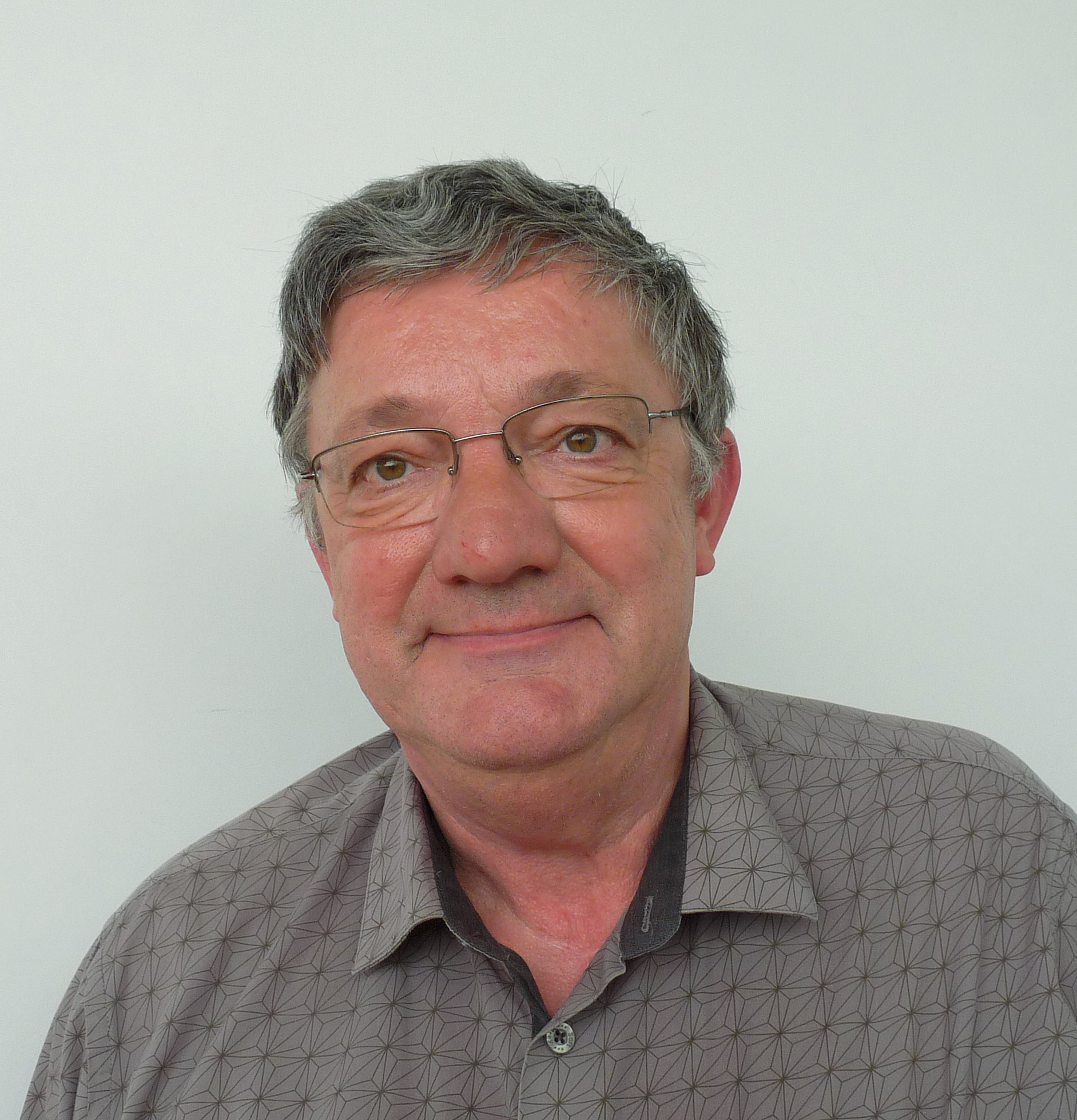
Pierre Stolze in 2012

Pierre Stolze (born April 12, 1952, in Metz) He studied at École Normale Supérieure gaining a doctorate there with a thesis on science fiction. As a writer he began in 1979 and won the Prix Rosny-Aîné in 1991.

== Bibliography ==
- 1979 : Le serpent d'éternité, collection Galaxie/bis, ed. Opta, n°63.
- 1980 : Kamtchatka , collection Galaxie/bis, éd. Opta, n°67.
- 1986 : Marilyn Monroe et les Samouraïs du père Noël, ed. J'ai Lu - SF, n°1962.
- 1990 : Cent mille images, ed. Philippe Olivier.

re-write for 1999 in collection Présence du Futur, n°603.

- 1990 : Intrusions (stories), ed. Aurore (editor) SF, n°11.
- 1994 : Le Déménagement (récit), Microéditions Maelström..
- 1995 : Theophano 960.
- 1995 : Volontaire désigné (stories).
- 1996 : La Maison Usher ne chutera pas , Microéditions Destination Crépuscule.

re-write for 1999 in collection Présence du Futur, n°603.

- 1996 : Greta Garbo et les crocodiles du Père Fouettard, ed. Hors Commerce, n°11.
- 1998 : Volontaire désigné (novel), éd. Hors Commerce, n°16.
- 2002 : Marlène Dietrich et les bretelles du Père Éternel (novel), ed. Hors Commerce, n°31.
