= Yves Frémion =

French author

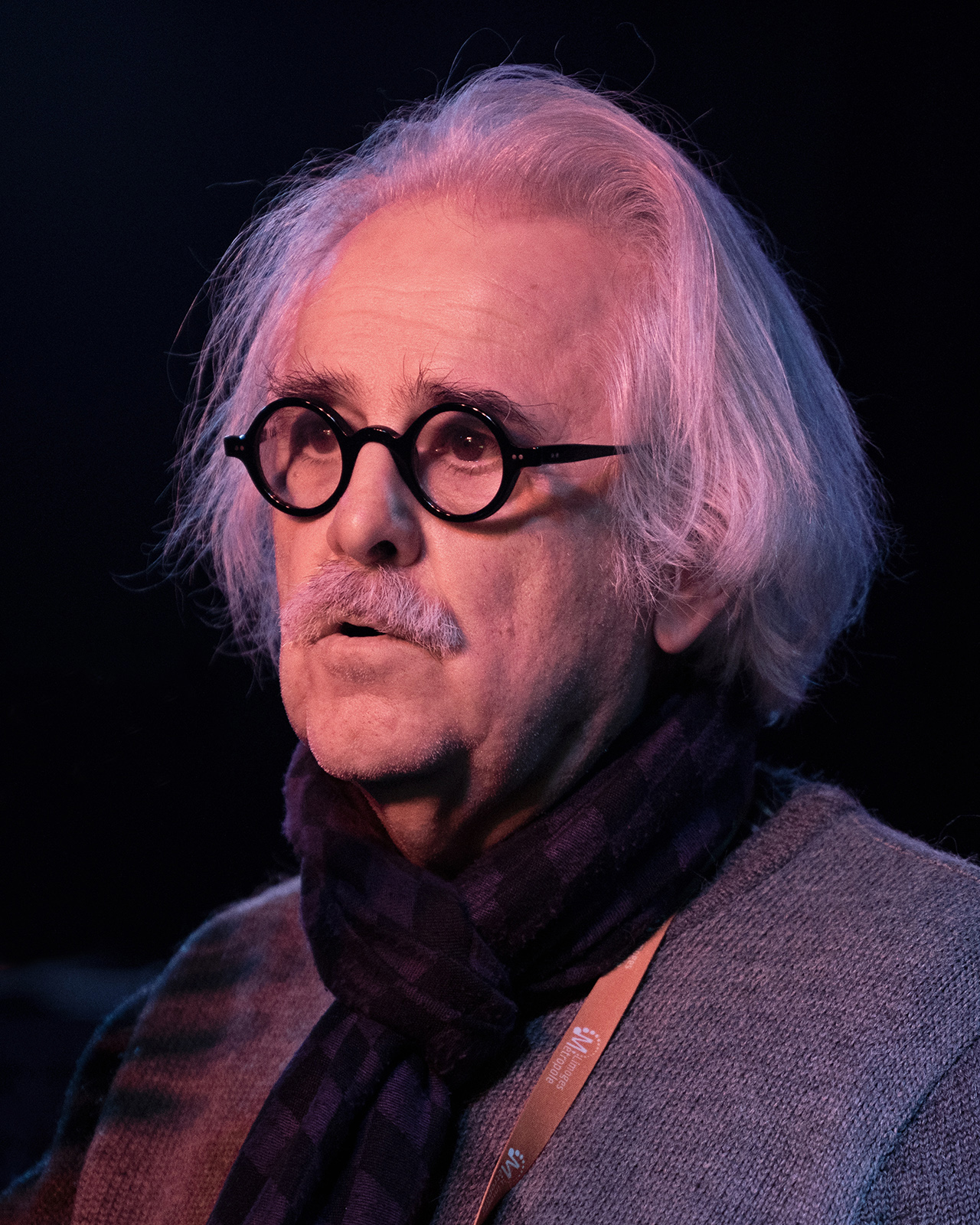
Frémion in 2023

Yves Frémion (born 14 June 1947 in Lyon) is a French author and former editor of the French science fiction magazine Univers. He has also edited a number of anthologies and has worked for the comic and humour magazine Fluide Glacial. His work L'hétéradelphe de Gane won the Prix Rosny-Aîné in 1990. His most recent work is the book Orgasms of History: 3000 years of spontaneous insurrection, which charts episodes of "revolt and utopia" throughout history.

He is a member of the French Green Party and served in the European Parliament in 1991–1994.

== Bibliography ==
- L'hétéradelphe de Gane (winner Prix Rosny-Aîné 1990)
- Les nouveaux petits-miquets
- Octobre, octobres
- Rêves de sable, châteaux de sang
- Rönge
- Orgasms of History: 3000 Years of Spontaneous Insurrection (2002)
