= Silverman–Toeplitz theorem =

Theorem of summability methods

In mathematics, the Silverman–Toeplitz theorem, first proved by Otto Toeplitz, is a result in series summability theory characterizing matrix summability methods that are regular. A regular matrix summability method is a linear sequence transformation that preserves the limits of convergent sequences. The linear sequence transformation can be applied to the divergent sequences of partial sums of divergent series to give those series generalized sums.

An infinite matrix $(a_{i,j})_{i,j \in \mathbb{N}}$ with complex-valued entries defines a regular matrix summability method if and only if it satisfies all of the following properties:

$$\begin{align}
& \lim_{i \to \infty} a_{i,j} = 0 \quad j \in \mathbb{N} & & \text{(Every column sequence converges to 0.)} \\[3pt]
& \lim_{i \to \infty} \sum_{j=0}^{\infty} a_{i,j} = 1 & & \text{(The row sums converge to 1.)} \\[3pt]
& \sup_i \sum_{j=0}^{\infty} \vert a_{i,j} \vert < \infty & & \text{(The absolute row sums are bounded.)}
\end{align}$$

An example is Cesàro summation, a matrix summability method with

$$a_{mn}=\begin{cases}\frac{1}{m} & n\le m\\ 0 & n>m\end{cases} = \begin{pmatrix}
1 & 0 & 0 & 0 & 0 & \cdots \\
\frac{1}{2} & \frac{1}{2} & 0 & 0 & 0 & \cdots \\
\frac{1}{3} & \frac{1}{3} & \frac{1}{3} & 0 & 0 & \cdots \\
\frac{1}{4} & \frac{1}{4} & \frac{1}{4} & \frac{1}{4} & 0 & \cdots \\
\frac{1}{5} & \frac{1}{5} & \frac{1}{5} & \frac{1}{5} & \frac{1}{5} & \cdots \\
\vdots & \vdots & \vdots & \vdots & \vdots & \ddots \\
\end{pmatrix}.$$

== Formal statement ==
Let the aforementioned inifinite matrix $(a_{i,j})_{i,j \in \mathbb{N}}$ of complex elements satisfy the following conditions:

1. $\lim_{i \to \infty} a_{i,j} = 0$ for every fixed $j \in \mathbb{N}$.
2. $\sup_{i \in \mathbb{N}} \sum_{j=1}^{i} \vert a_{i,j} \vert < \infty$;

and $z_{n}$ be a sequence of complex numbers that converges to $\lim_{n \to \infty} z_{n} = z_{\infty}$. We denote $S_{n}$ as the weighted sum sequence: $S_{n} = \sum_{m = 1}^{n} a_{n, m} z_{m}$.

Then the following results hold:

1. If $\lim_{n \to \infty} z_{n} = z_{\infty} = 0$, then $\lim_{n \to \infty} {S_{n}} = 0$.
2. If $\lim_{n \to \infty} z_{n} = z_{\infty} \ne 0$ and $\lim_{i \to \infty} \sum_{j=1}^{i} a_{i,j} = 1$, then $\lim_{n \to \infty} {S_{n}} = z_{\infty}$.

== Proof ==
=== Proving 1. ===
For the fixed $j \in \mathbb{N}$ the complex sequences $z_{n}$, $S_{n}$ and $a_{i, j}$ approach zero if and only if the real-values sequences $\left| z_{n} \right|$, $\left| S_{n} \right|$ and $\left| a_{i, j} \right|$ approach zero respectively. We also introduce $M = 1 + \sup_{i \in \mathbb{N}} \sum_{j=1}^{i} \vert a_{i,j} \vert > 0$.

Since $\left| z_{n} \right| \to 0$, for prematurely chosen $\varepsilon > 0$ there exists $N_{\varepsilon} \in \mathbb{N}$, so for every $n > N_{\varepsilon}$ we have $\left| z_{n} \right| < \frac {\varepsilon} {2M}$. Next, for some $N_{a} = N_{a}\left( \varepsilon \right ) > N_{\varepsilon}$ it's true, that $\sum_{m=1}^n |a_{n, m} |< \frac {\varepsilon} {2\left(\max_{m\leq N_\varepsilon} |z_m| +1 \right)}$ for every $n > N_{a}\left( \varepsilon \right )$. Therefore, for every $n > N_{a}\left( \varepsilon \right )$

$$\begin{align}
& \left| S_{n} \right|
= \left| \sum_{m = 1}^{n} \left( a_{n, m} z_{m} \right) \right| \leqslant  \sum_{m = 1}^{n} \left( \left| a_{n, m} \right| \cdot \left|  z_{m} \right| \right)
= \sum_{m = 1}^{N_{\varepsilon}} \left( \left| a_{n, m} \right| \cdot \left| z_{m} \right| \right) + \sum_{m = N_{\varepsilon}+1}^{n} \left( \left| a_{n, m} \right| \cdot \left|  z_{m} \right| \right) < \\
& < \max_{1 \leq m \leq N_\varepsilon} (|z_m| ) \cdot \sum_{m=1}^{N_\varepsilon} |a_{n,m} | + \frac {\varepsilon} {2M} \sum_{m = N_{\varepsilon}+1}^{n}  \left| a_{n, m} \right|
\leqslant \frac {\varepsilon} {2} + \frac {\varepsilon} {2M} \sum_{m = 1}^{n} \left| a_{n, m} \right|
\leqslant \frac {\varepsilon} {2} + \frac {\varepsilon} {2M} \cdot M
= \varepsilon
\end{align}$$

which means, that both sequences $\left| S_{n} \right|$ and $S_{n}$ converge zero.

=== Proving 2. ===
$\lim_{n \to \infty} \left( z_{m} - z_{\infty} \right) = 0$. Applying the already proven statement yields. Finally,$\lim_{n \to \infty} \sum_{m=1}^{n} \big( a_{n,m} \left( z_{m} - z_{\infty} \right) \big) = 0$

$\lim_{n \to \infty} S_{n} = \lim_{n \to \infty} \sum_{m=1}^{n} \big( a_{n,m} z_{m} \big) = \lim_{n \to \infty} \sum_{m=1}^{n} \big( a_{n,m} \left( z_{m} - z_{\infty} \right) \big) + z_{\infty} \lim_{n \to \infty} \sum_{m=1}^{n} \big( a_{n,m} \big) = 0 + z_{\infty} \cdot 1 = z_{\infty}$, which completes the proof.
