= Jean-Claude Dunyach =

French science fiction writer

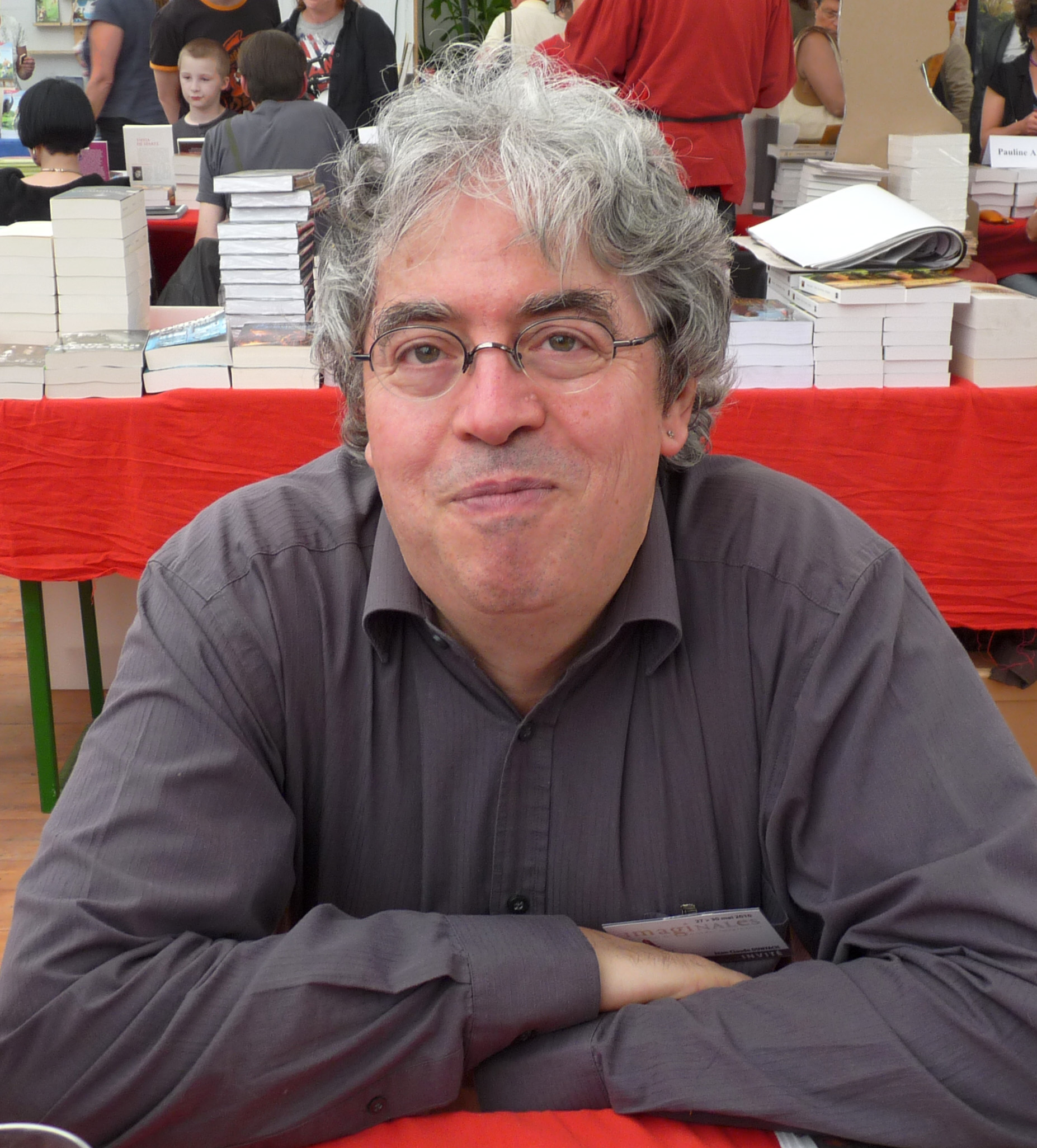
Jean-Claude Dunyach in 2010

Jean-Claude Dunyach (born 1957) is a French science fiction writer.

== Overview ==
Dunyach has a Ph.D. in applied mathematics and supercomputing from Paul Sabatier University. He works for Airbus in Toulouse in southwestern France.

Dunyach has been writing science fiction since the beginning of the 1980s and has already published nine novels and ten collections of short stories, garnering the French Science-Fiction award in 1983 and the Prix Rosny-Aîné Awards in 1992, as well as the Grand Prix de l’Imaginaire and the Prix Ozone in 1997.

His short story Déchiffrer la Trame (Unravelling the Thread) won both the Prix de l’Imaginaire and the Rosny Award in 1998, and was voted Best Story of the Year by the readers of the magazine Interzone.

His novel, Etoiles Mourantes (Dying Stars), written in collaboration with the French author Ayerdhal, won the prestigious Eiffel Tower Award in 1999 as well as the Prix Ozone.

Dunyach's works have been translated into English, Bulgarian, Croatian, Danish, Hungarian, German, Italian, Russian and Spanish.

Dunyach also writes lyrics for several French singers, which served as an inspiration for one of his novels about a rock and roll singer touring in Antarctica with a zombie philharmonic orchestra...

== Bibliography ==
- Autoportrait (Self-Portrait) (collection) (Présence du Futur No. 415, Denoël, Paris, 1986)
- Le Temple de Chair (Le Jeu des Sabliers, Tome 1) (The Temple of Flesh (The Game of the Hourglass, Vol. 1)) (Anticipation No. 1592, Fleuve Noir, Paris, 1987)
- Le Temple d’Os (Le Jeu des Sabliers, Tome 2) (The Temple of Bones (The Game of the Hourglass, Vol. 2)) (Anticipation No. 1609, Fleuve Noir, Paris, 1988)
- Nivôse (Étoiles Mortes, Tome1) (Nivose (Dead Stars, Vol. 1)) (Anticipation No.1837, Fleuve Noir, Paris, 1991)
- Aigue-Marine (Étoiles Mortes, Tome 2) (Aigue-Marine (Dead Stars, Vol. 2)) (Anticipation No.1838, Fleuve Noir, Paris, 1991)
- Voleurs de Silence (Étoiles Mortes, Tome 3) (Thieves of Silence (Dead Stars, Vol. 3) (Anticipation No. 1858, Fleuve Noir, Paris, 1992)
- Roll Over, Amundsen (Anticipation No. 1912, Fleuve Noir, Paris, 1993)
- La Guerre des Cercles (The War of the Circles) (Anticipation No. 1963, Fleuve Noir, Paris, 1995)
- Étoiles Mourantes (Dying Stars) (with Ayerdhal) (J’ai Lu Millénaire, Paris, 1999)
- La Station de l’Agnelle (Station of the Lamb) (collection) (L’Atalante, Nantes, 2000)
- Dix Jours Sans Voir la Mer (Ten Days Without Looking at the Sea) (collection) (L’Atalante, Nantes, 2000)
- Étoiles Mortes (Dead Stars) (J’ai Lu, Paris, 2000)
- Déchiffrer la Trame (Unravelling the Thread) (collection) (L’Atalante, Nantes, 2001)
- Le Jeu des Sabliers (The Game of the Hourglass) (ISF, Paris, 2003)
- Les Nageurs de Sable (The Sand Swimmers) (collection) (L’Atalante, Nantes, 2003)
- Le temps, en s'évaporant... (Time, as it evaporates...) (collection) (L’Atalante, Nantes, 2005)
- Séparations (Separations) (collection) (L’Atalante, Nantes, 2007)
- Les harmoniques célestes (Celestial harmonics) (collection) (L’Atalante, Nantes, 2011)
- L'Instinct du troll (Troll's instinct) (collection) (L’Atalante, Nantes, 2015)
- Le Clin d'œil du héron (With a wink of the heron's eye) (collection) (L’Atalante, Nantes, 2015)
- L'Enfer du troll (Troll's inferno) (L’Atalante, Nantes, 2017)
- Trois hourras pour Lady Évangeline (Three Hurrahs for Lady Évangeline) (L’Atalante, Nantes, 2019)
- L'Empire du troll (Troll's empire) (L’Atalante, Nantes, 2021)

=== In English ===
- In Medicis Gardens, in Full Spectrum 4, Bantam Spectra, New York, 1993
- The Dead Eye of the Camera, in Full Spectrum 5, Bantam Spectra, New York, 1995
- Unravelling the Thread, in Interzone 133, Brighton, UK, July 1998; reprinted in Year's Best SF 4, HarperPrism, New York, 1999
- Come Into My Parlor, in Altair 1, Blackwood, SA, Australia, 1998
- Footprints in the Snow, in Interzone 150, Brighton, UK, December 1999
- Station of the Lamb, in Altair 6, Blackwood, SA, Australia, 2000
- All the Roads to Heaven, in Interzone 156, Brighton, UK, June 2000
- Orchids in the Night, in Interzone 160, Brighton, UK, October 2000
- Watch Me When I Sleep, appeared in Interzone 168, Brighton, UK, June 2001; reprinted in Year's Best Fantasy and Horror, Tor Books, New York, 2002
- Enter the Worms, in On Spec, Volume 14, Number 2, Edmonton, Canada, Summer 2002
- What the Dead Know, in On Spec, Volume 16, Number 1, Edmonton, Canada, Spring 2004
- The Night Orchid: Conan Doyle in Toulouse, (collection of short stories) Black Coat Press, 2004 ISBN 0-9740711-7-X
- Separations, in The SFWA European Hall of Fame, Edited by James and Kathryn Morrow, Tor 2007
- The Thieves of Silence (collection of short stories) Black Coat Press, 2009 ISBN 1-934543-72-1
- God, Seen From the Inside, in Galaxy's edge issue 06, USA, January 2014
- Love your ennemy, in Galaxy's edge issue 20, USA, May 2016
- Paranamanco, in The Big Book of Science Fiction, USA, July 2016
- Landscape with intruders, in Blind Spot issue 01, USA, August 2016
- With a wink of the heron's eye, in Galaxy's Edge issue 29, USA, November 2017
- Paranamanco (collection of short stories) Black Coat Press, 2023 ISBN 978-1-64932-192-3

== Literary prizes ==
- 1984 : Grand Prix de la science-fiction française, category short stories, for Les Nageurs de sable (Sandswimmers);
- 1992 : Prix Rosny aîné, category novels, for Étoiles mortes;
- 1992 : Prix Rosny aîné, category short stories, for De l'autre côté de l'eau;
- 1997 : Prix Ozone, category horror short stories, for Ce que savent les morts (What the dead know);
- 1998 : Grand Prix de l'Imaginaire, category short stories in French, for Déchiffrer la trame (Unravelling the thread);
- 1998 : Prix Rosny aîné, category short stories, or Déchiffrer la trame (Unravelling the thread);
- 1999 : Prix Tour Eiffel de science-fiction, category novels, for Étoiles mourantes, written in collaboration with Ayerdhal;
- 2000 : Prix Ozone, category novels in French for Étoiles mourantes, written in collaboration with Ayerdhal;
- 2008 : Prix Rosny aîné, category short stories, for Repli sur soie;
- 2017 : Prix Imaginales, category short stories, for Le clin d'oeil du héron (With a wink of the heron's eye);
