= Roland Stoltz (ice hockey, born 1954) =

Swedish ice hockey player

- Born: 15 August 1954 (age 71) Överkalix, Sweden
- Height: 6 ft 0 in (183 cm)
- Weight: 187 lb (85 kg; 13 st 5 lb)
- Position: Forward
- Shot: Right
- Played for: Skellefteå AIK; Washington Capitals
- NHL draft: Undrafted
- Playing career: 1971–1989

Stig Roland Stoltz (born 15 August 1954) is a Swedish former ice hockey right winger. He played 14 games for the Washington Capitals of the National Hockey League during the 1981–82 season. The rest of his career, which lasted from 1969 to 1989, was mainly spent in the Swedish Elitserien. Internationally Stoltz played for the Swedish national team at the 1981 World Championships, winning a silver medal. He was inducted into the Skellefteå AIK Wall of Fame.

== Career statistics ==
=== Regular season and playoffs ===
			Regular season					Playoffs
Season	Team	League	GP	G	A	Pts	PIM	GP	G	A	Pts	PIM
1969–70	Överkalix IF	SWE-3	9	6	5	11	—	—	—	—	—	—
1971–72	Överkalix IF	SWE-3	15	12	3	15	—	—	—	—	—	—
1972–73	IFK Luleå	SWE-2	17	11	—	—	—	—	—	—	—	—
1973–74	IFK Luleå	SWE-2	24	26	—	—	—	—	—	—	—	—
1974–75	IFK Luleå	SWE-2	20	—	—	—	—	—	—	—	—	—
1975–76	Skellefteå AIK	SWE	32	15	10	25	8	—	—	—	—	—
1976–77	Skellefteå AIK	SWE	32	12	5	17	16	—	—	—	—	—
1977–78	Skellefteå AIK	SWE	34	13	13	26	14	5	0	1	1	2
1978–79	Skellefteå AIK	SWE	36	16	12	28	26	—	—	—	—	—
1979–80	Skellefteå AIK	SWE	36	15	9	24	47	—	—	—	—	—
1980–81	Skellefteå AIK	SWE	35	18	19	37	34	3	0	0	0	0
1981–82	Washington Capitals	NHL	14	2	2	4	14	—	—	—	—	—
1981–82	Skellefteå AIK	SWE	20	7	7	14	24	—	—	—	—	—
1982–83	Skellefteå AIK	SWE	31	4	8	12	26	—	—	—	—	—
1983–84	Skellefteå AIK	SWE	35	8	22	30	36	—	—	—	—	—
1984–85	Skellefteå AIK	SWE	36	17	17	34	36	—	—	—	—	—
1985–86	Skellefteå AIK	SWE-2	30	15	23	38	28	—	—	—	—	—
1986–87	Skellefteå AIK	SWE	34	7	11	18	38	—	—	—	—	—
1987–88	Malå IF	SWE-3	23	19	23	42	—	—	—	—	—	—
1988–89	Malå IF	SWE-3	1	2	2	4	—	—	—	—	—	—
SWE totals			361	132	133	265	305	8	0	1	1	2
NHL totals			14	2	2	4	14	—	—	—	—	—

=== International ===
Medal record

Representing Sweden

World Championships
Silver medal – second place	1981 Sweden	

Year	Team	Event	GP	G	A	Pts	PIM
1981	Sweden	WC	8	1	2	3	6
Senior totals			8	1	2	3	6
