= Stolz–Cesàro theorem =

Formula for evaluation of limits of some real-valued sequences

In mathematics, the Stolz–Cesàro theorem is a criterion for proving the convergence of a sequence. It is named after mathematicians Otto Stolz and Ernesto Cesàro, who stated and proved it for the first time.

The Stolz–Cesàro theorem can be viewed as a generalization of the Cesàro mean, but also as a l'Hôpital's rule for sequences.

== Statement of the theorem for the */∞ case ==
Let $(a_n)_{n \geq 1}$ and $(b_n)_{n \geq 1}$ be two sequences of real numbers. Assume that $(b_n)_{n \geq 1}$ is a strictly monotonic and divergent sequence (i.e. strictly increasing and approaching $+ \infty$, or strictly decreasing and approaching $- \infty$) and the following limit exists:

$$\lim_{n \to \infty} \frac{a_{n+1}-a_n}{b_{n+1}-b_n}=l.\$$

Then, the limit

$$\lim_{n \to \infty} \frac{a_n}{b_n}=l.\$$

== Statement of the theorem for the 0/0 case ==
Let $(a_n)_{n \geq 1}$ and $(b_n)_{n \geq 1}$ be two sequences of real numbers. Assume now that $(a_n)\to 0$ and $(b_n)\to 0$ while $(b_n)_{n \geq 1}$ is strictly decreasing. If

$$\lim_{n \to \infty} \frac{a_{n+1}-a_n}{b_{n+1}-b_n}=l,\$$

then

$\lim_{n \to \infty} \frac{a_n}{b_n}=l.\$

== Proofs ==
=== Proof of the theorem for the */∞ case ===
Case 1: suppose $(b_n)$ strictly increasing and divergent to $+\infty$, and $-\infty<l<\infty$. By hypothesis, we have that for all $\epsilon/2 > 0$ there exists $\nu > 0$ such that $\forall n > \nu$

$$\left|\,\frac{a_{n+1}-a_n}{b_{n+1}-b_n}-l\,\right| < \frac{\epsilon}{2},$$

which is to say

$$l-\epsilon/2<\frac{a_{n+1}-a_n}{b_{n+1}-b_n}<l+\epsilon/2,\quad\forall n > \nu.$$

Since $(b_n)$ is strictly increasing, $b_{n+1}-b_n>0$, and the following holds

$$(l-\epsilon/2)(b_{n+1}-b_n)<a_{n+1}-a_n<(l+\epsilon/2)(b_{n+1}-b_n),\quad\forall n > \nu$$.

Next we notice that

$$a_n = [(a_n-a_{n-1})+\dots+(a_{\nu+2}-a_{\nu+1})]+a_{\nu+1}$$

thus, by applying the above inequality to each of the terms in the square brackets, we obtain

$$\begin{align}
&(l-\epsilon/2)(b_n-b_{\nu+1})+a_{\nu+1}=(l-\epsilon/2)[(b_n-b_{n-1})+\dots+(b_{\nu+2}-b_{\nu+1})]+a_{\nu+1}<a_n\\
&a_n<(l+\epsilon/2)[(b_n-b_{n-1})+\dots+(b_{\nu+2}-b_{\nu+1})]+a_{\nu+1}=(l+\epsilon/2)(b_n-b_{\nu+1})+a_{\nu+1}.\end{align}$$

Now, since $b_n\to+\infty$ as $n\to\infty$, there is an $n_0>0$ such that $b_n>0$ for all $n>n_0$, and we can divide the two inequalities by $b_n$ for all $n>\max\{\nu,n_0\}$

$$(l-\epsilon/2)+\frac{a_{\nu+1}-b_{\nu+1}(l-\epsilon/2)}{b_n}<\frac{a_n}{b_n}<(l+\epsilon/2)+\frac{a_{\nu+1}-b_{\nu+1}(l+\epsilon/2)}{b_n}.$$

The two sequences (which are only defined for $n>n_0$ as there could be an $N\leq n_0$ such that $b_N=0$)

$$c^{\pm}_n:=\frac{a_{\nu+1}-b_{\nu+1}(l\pm\epsilon/2)}{b_n}$$

are infinitesimal since $b_n\to+\infty$ and the numerator is a constant number, hence for all $\epsilon/2>0$ there exists $n_{\pm}>n_0>0$, such that

$$\begin{align}
&|c^+_n|<\epsilon/2,\quad\forall n > n_+,\\
&|c^-_n|<\epsilon/2,\quad\forall n > n_-,
\end{align}$$

therefore

$$l-\epsilon < l-\epsilon/2+c^-_n < \frac{a_n}{b_n} < l+\epsilon/2+c^+_n<l+\epsilon,\quad\forall n > \max\lbrace\nu,n_{\pm}\rbrace =: N > 0,$$

which concludes the proof. The case with $(b_n)$ strictly decreasing and divergent to $-\infty$, and $l<\infty$ is similar.

Case 2: we assume $(b_n)$ strictly increasing and divergent to $+\infty$, and $l=+\infty$. Proceeding as before, for all $2M > 0$ there exists $\nu > 0$ such that for all $n > \nu$

$$\frac{a_{n+1}-a_n}{b_{n+1}-b_n} > 2M.$$

Again, by applying the above inequality to each of the terms inside the square brackets we obtain

$$a_n > 2M(b_n-b_{\nu+1}) + a_{\nu+1},\quad\forall n > \nu,$$

and

$$\frac{a_n}{b_n} > 2M + \frac{a_{\nu+1}-2M b_{\nu+1}}{b_n},\quad\forall n > \max\{\nu,n_0\}.$$

The sequence $(c_n)_{n>n_0}$ defined by

$$c_n := \frac{a_{\nu+1}-2M b_{\nu+1}}{b_n}$$

is infinitesimal, thus

$$\forall M > 0\,\exists \bar{n}>n_0>0 \text{ such that } -M < c_n < M,\,\forall n > \bar{n},$$

combining this inequality with the previous one we conclude

$$\frac{a_n}{b_n} > 2M + c_n > M,\quad\forall n > \max\{\nu,\bar{n}\} =: N.$$

The proofs of the other cases with $(b_n)$ strictly increasing or decreasing and approaching $+\infty$ or $-\infty$ respectively and $l=\pm\infty$ all proceed in this same way.

=== Proof of the theorem for the 0/0 case ===
Case 1: we first consider the case with $l < \infty$ and $(b_n)$ strictly decreasing. This time, for each $\nu > 0$, we can write

$$a_n = (a_n-a_{n+1})+\dots+(a_{n+\nu-1}-a_{n+\nu})+a_{n+\nu},$$

and for any $\epsilon/2>0,$ $\exist n_0$ such that for all $n>n_0$ we have

$$\begin{align}
&(l-\epsilon/2)(b_n-b_{n+\nu})+a_{n+\nu} = (l-\epsilon/2)[(b_n-b_{n+1})+\dots+(b_{n+\nu-1}-b_{n+\nu})]+a_{n+\nu} < a_n\\
&a_n < (l+\epsilon/2)[(b_n-b_{n+1})+\dots+(b_{n+\nu-1}-b_{n+\nu})]+a_{n+\nu} = (l+\epsilon/2)(b_n-b_{n+\nu})+a_{n+\nu}.\end{align}$$

The two sequences

$$c^{\pm}_\nu := \frac{a_{n+\nu}-b_{n+\nu}(l\pm\epsilon/2)}{b_n}$$

are infinitesimal since by hypothesis $a_{n+\nu},b_{n+\nu} \to 0$ as $\nu\to\infty$, thus for all $\epsilon/2 > 0$ there are $\nu_{\pm} > 0$ such that

$$\begin{align}
&|c^+_\nu| < \epsilon/2,\quad\forall \nu>\nu_+,\\
&|c^-_\nu| < \epsilon/2,\quad\forall \nu>\nu_-,
\end{align}$$

thus, choosing $\nu$ appropriately (which is to say, taking the limit with respect to $\nu$) we obtain

$$l-\epsilon < l-\epsilon/2+c^-_\nu < \frac{a_n}{b_n} < l+\epsilon/2+c^+_\nu < l+\epsilon,\quad\forall n > n_0$$

which concludes the proof.

Case 2: we assume $l=+\infty$ and $(b_n)$ strictly decreasing. For all $2M > 0$ there exists $n_0 > 0$ such that for all $n > n_0,$

$$\frac{a_{n+1}-a_n}{b_{n+1}-b_n} > 2M \implies a_n-a_{n+1} > 2M(b_n-b_{n+1}).$$

Therefore, for each $\nu > 0,$

$$\frac{a_n}{b_n} > 2M + \frac{a_{n+\nu}-2M b_{n+\nu}}{b_n},\quad\forall n > n_0.$$

The sequence

$$c_{\nu} := \frac{a_{n+\nu}-2M b_{n+\nu}}{b_n}$$

converges to $0$ (keeping $n$ fixed). Hence

$\forall M > 0\,~\exists \bar{\nu} > 0$ such that $-M < c_\nu < M,\,\forall \nu > \bar{\nu},$

and, choosing $\nu$ conveniently, we conclude the proof

$$\frac{a_n}{b_n} > 2M + c_\nu > M,\quad\forall n > n_0.$$

== Applications and examples ==
The theorem concerning the ∞/∞ case has a few notable consequences which are useful in the computation of limits.

=== Arithmetic mean ===
Let $(x_n)$ be a sequence of real numbers which converges to $l$, define

$$a_n:=\sum_{m=1}^nx_m=x_1+\dots+x_n,\quad b_n:=n$$

then $(b_n)$ is strictly increasing and diverges to $+\infty$. We compute

$$\lim_{n\to\infty}\frac{a_{n+1}-a_n}{b_{n+1}-b_n}=\lim_{n\to\infty} x_{n+1}=\lim_{n\to\infty} x_n=l$$

therefore

$$\lim_{n\to\infty}\frac{x_1+\dots+ x_n}{n}=\lim_{n\to\infty}x_n.$$

Given any sequence $(x_n)_{n\geq 1}$ of real numbers, suppose that

$$\lim_{n\to\infty}x_n$$

exists (finite or infinite), then

$$\lim_{n\to\infty}\frac{x_1+\dots+x_n}{n}=\lim_{n\to\infty}x_n.$$

=== Geometric mean ===
Let $(x_n)$ be a sequence of positive real numbers converging to $l$ and define

$$a_n:=\log(x_1\cdots x_n),\quad b_n:=n,$$

again we compute

$$\lim_{n\to\infty}\frac{a_{n+1}-a_n}{b_{n+1}-b_n}=\lim_{n\to\infty}\log\Big(\frac{x_1\cdots x_{n+1}}{x_1\cdots x_n}\Big)=\lim_{n\to\infty}\log(x_{n+1})=\lim_{n\to\infty}\log(x_n)=\log(l),$$

where we used the fact that the logarithm is continuous. Thus

$$\lim_{n\to\infty}\frac{\log(x_1\cdots x_n)}{n}=\lim_{n\to\infty}\log\Big((x_1\cdots x_n)^{\frac{1}{n}}\Big)=\log(l),$$

since the logarithm is both continuous and injective we can conclude that

$$\lim_{n\to\infty}\sqrt[n]{x_1\cdots x_n}=\lim_{n\to\infty}x_n$$.

Given any sequence $(x_n)_{n\geq 1}$ of (strictly) positive real numbers, suppose that

$$\lim_{n\to\infty}x_n$$

exists (finite or infinite), then

$$\lim_{n\to\infty}\sqrt[n]{x_1\cdots x_n}=\lim_{n\to\infty}x_n.$$

Suppose we are given a sequence $(y_n)_{n\geq1}$ and we are asked to compute

$$\lim_{n\to\infty}\sqrt[n]{y_n},$$

defining $y_0=1$ and $x_n=y_n/y_{n-1}$ we obtain

$$\lim_{n\to\infty}\sqrt[n]{x_1\dots x_n}=\lim_{n\to\infty}\sqrt[n]{\frac{y_1\dots y_{n}}{y_0\cdot y_1\dots y_{n-1}}}=\lim_{n\to\infty}\sqrt[n]{y_n},$$

if we apply the property above

$$\lim_{n\to\infty}\sqrt[n]{y_n}=\lim_{n\to\infty} x_n=\lim_{n\to\infty}\frac{y_n}{y_{n-1}}.$$

This last form is usually the most useful to compute limits

Given any sequence $(y_n)_{n\geq 1}$ of (strictly) positive real numbers, suppose that

$$\lim_{n\to\infty}\frac{y_{n+1}}{y_{n}}$$

exists (finite or infinite), then

$$\lim_{n\to\infty}\sqrt[n]{y_n}=\lim_{n\to\infty}\frac{y_{n+1}}{y_{n}}.$$

=== Examples ===
==== Example 1 ====
$$\lim_{n\to\infty}\sqrt[n]{n}=\lim_{n\to\infty}\frac{n+1}{n}=1.$$

==== Example 2 ====
$$\begin{align}
\lim_{n\to\infty}\frac{\sqrt[n]{n!}}{n}&=\lim_ {n\to\infty}\frac{(n+1)!(n^n)}{n!(n+1)^{n+1}}\\
&=\lim_{n\to\infty}\frac{n^n}{(n+1)^n}=\lim_{n\to\infty}\frac{1}{(1+\frac{1}{n})^n}=\frac{1}{e}
\end{align}$$

where we used the representation of $e$ as the limit of a sequence.

== History ==
The ∞/∞ case is stated and proved on pages 173—175 of Stolz's 1885 book and also on page 54 of Cesàro's 1888 article.

It appears as Problem 70 in Pólya and Szegő (1925).

== The general form ==
=== Statement ===
The general form of the Stolz–Cesàro theorem is the following: If $(a_n)_{n\geq 1}$ and $(b_n)_{n\geq 1}$ are two sequences such that $(b_n)_{n \geq 1}$ is monotone and unbounded, then:

$$\liminf_{n\to\infty} \frac{a_{n+1}-a_n}{b_{n+1}-b_n}\leq \liminf_{n\to\infty}\frac{a_n}{b_n}\leq\limsup_{n\to\infty}\frac{a_n}{b_n}\leq\limsup_{n\to\infty}\frac{a_{n+1}-a_n}{b_{n+1}-b_n}.$$

=== Proof ===
Instead of proving the previous statement, we shall prove a slightly different one; first we introduce a notation: let $(a_n)_{n\geq1}$ be any sequence, its partial sum will be denoted by $A_n:=\sum_{m\geq1}^na_m$. The equivalent statement we shall prove is:

Let $(a_n)_{n\geq1},(b_n)_{\geq1}$ be any two sequences of real numbers such that

- $b_n > 0, \quad \forall n\in {\mathbb{Z}}_{>0}$,
- $\lim_{n\to\infty}B_n=+\infty$,

then

$$\liminf_{n\to\infty}\frac{a_n}{b_n}\leq\liminf_{n\to\infty}\frac{A_n}{B_n}\leq\limsup_{n\to\infty}\frac{A_n}{B_n}\leq\limsup_{n\to\infty}\frac{a_n}{b_n}.$$

==== Proof of the equivalent statement ====
First we notice that:

- $\liminf_{n\to\infty}\frac{A_n}{B_n}\leq\limsup_{n\to\infty}\frac{A_n}{B_n}$ holds by definition of limit superior and limit inferior;
- $\liminf_{n\to\infty}\frac{a_n}{b_n}\leq\liminf_{n\to\infty}\frac{A_n}{B_n}$ holds if and only if $\limsup_{n\to\infty}\frac{A_n}{B_n}\leq\limsup_{n\to\infty}\frac{a_n}{b_n}$ because $\liminf_{n\to\infty} x_n=-\limsup_{n\to\infty}(-x_n)$ for any sequence $(x_n)_{n\geq1}$.

Therefore we need only to show that $\limsup_{n\to\infty}\frac{A_n}{B_n}\leq\limsup_{n\to\infty}\frac{a_n}{b_n}$. If $L:=\limsup_{n\to\infty}\frac{a_n}{b_n}=+\infty$ there is nothing to prove, hence we can assume $L<+\infty$ (it can be either finite or $-\infty$). By definition of $\limsup$, for all $l > L$ there is a natural number $\nu>0$ such that

$$\frac{a_n}{b_n}<l,\quad\forall n>\nu.$$

We can use this inequality so as to write

$$A_n = A_\nu + a_{\nu + 1} + \dots + a_n < A_\nu + l(B_n - B_\nu), \quad\forall n > \nu,$$

Because $b_n>0$, we also have $B_n>0$ and we can divide by $B_n$ to get

$$\frac{A_n}{B_n} < \frac{A_\nu - lB_\nu}{B_n} + l, \quad \forall n > \nu.$$

Since $B_n\to+\infty$ as $n\to+\infty$, the sequence

$$\frac{A_{\nu}-lB_{\nu}}{B_n}\to0\text{ as } n\to+\infty \text{ (keeping }\nu\text{ fixed)},$$

and we obtain

$$\limsup_{n\to\infty} \frac{A_n}{B_n} \le l, \quad\forall l > L,$$

By definition of least upper bound, this precisely means that

$$\limsup_{n\to\infty}\frac{A_n}{B_n}\leq L=\limsup_{n\to\infty}\frac{a_n}{b_n},$$

and we are done.

==== Proof of the original statement ====
Now, take $(a_n),(b_n)$ as in the statement of the general form of the Stolz-Cesàro theorem and define

$$\alpha_1=a_1,\alpha_k=a_k-a_{k-1},\,\forall k>1\quad\beta_1=b_1,\beta_k=b_k-b_{k-1}\,\forall k>1$$

since $(b_n)$ is strictly monotone (we can assume strictly increasing for example), $\beta_n>0$ for all $n$ and since $b_n\to+\infty$ also $\Beta_n=b_1+(b_2-b_1)+\dots+(b_n-b_{n-1})=b_n\to+\infty$, thus we can apply the theorem we have just proved to $(\alpha_n),(\beta_n)$ (and their partial sums $(\Alpha_n),(\Beta_n)$)

$$\limsup_{n\to\infty}\frac{a_n}{b_{n}}=\limsup_{n\to\infty}\frac{\Alpha_n}{\Beta_n}\leq\limsup_{n\to\infty}\frac{\alpha_n}{\beta_n}=\limsup_{n\to\infty}\frac{a_n-a_{n-1}}{b_n-b_{n-1}},$$

which is exactly what we wanted to prove.
