= Otto Stolz =

Austrian mathematician (1842–1905)

Otto Stolz

Otto Stolz (3 July 1842 – 23 November 1905) was an Austrian mathematician noted for his work on mathematical analysis and infinitesimals. Born in Hall in Tirol, he studied at the University of Innsbruck from 1860 and the University of Vienna from 1863, receiving his habilitation there in 1867. Two years later he studied in Berlin under Karl Weierstrass, Ernst Kummer and Leopold Kronecker, and in 1871 heard lectures in Göttingen by Alfred Clebsch and Felix Klein (with whom he would later correspond), before returning to Innsbruck permanently as a professor of mathematics.

His work began with geometry (on which he wrote his thesis) but after the influence of Weierstrass it shifted to real analysis, and many small useful theorems are credited to him. For example, he proved that a continuous function f on a closed interval [a, b] with midpoint convexity, i.e., $f\left(\frac{x + y}2\right) \leq \frac{f(x)+f(y)}{2}$, has left and right derivatives at each point in (a, b).

He died in 1905 shortly after finishing work on Einleitung in die Funktionentheorie. His name lives on in the Stolz–Cesàro theorem.

== Work on non-Archimedean systems ==
Stolz published a number of papers containing constructions of non-Archimedean extensions of the real numbers, as detailed by Ehrlich (2006). His work, as well as that of Paul du Bois-Reymond, was sharply criticized by Georg Cantor as an "abomination". Cantor published a "proof-sketch" of the inconsistency of infinitesimals. The errors in Cantor's proof are analyzed by Ehrlich (2006).

== Bibliography ==
- Philip Ehrlich (2006). "The rise of non-Archimedean mathematics and the roots of a misconception. I. The emergence of non-Archimedean systems of magnitudes", Archive for History of Exact Sciences 60, no. 1, pp. 1–121. doi:10.1007/s00407-005-0102-4
